= List of recently extinct invertebrates =

- Extinct in the wild (EW): 2 species
- Critically endangered (CR): 853 species
- Endangered (EN): 1,533 species
- Vulnerable (VU): 1,578 species
- Near threatened (NT, LR/cd): 1,119 species
- Least concern (LC): 8,632 species
- Data deficient (DD): 4,644 species
Invertebrate species (IUCN, 2025.2)
- 18,442 extant species have been evaluated
- 13,798 of those are fully assessed (Note: excludes data deficient evaluations.)
- 9,751 are not threatened at present
- 4,047 to 8,691 are threatened (Note: Threatened comprises CR, EN and VU. Upper estimate additionally includes DD.)
- 83 to 255 are extinct or extinct in the wild:
  - 81 extinct (EX) species (Note: Chart omits extinct (EX) species)
  - 2 extinct in the wild (EW)
  - 171 possibly extinct [CR(PE)]
  - 1 possibly extinct in the wild [CR(PEW)]

As of July 2016, the International Union for Conservation of Nature (IUCN) lists 395 extinct species, 206 possibly extinct species, 15 extinct in the wild species, 8 extinct subspecies, and 5 extinct in the wild subspecies of invertebrate.

== Nemertea ==
Extinct species

- Geonemertes rodericana

Possibly extinct species

- Prosadenoporus agricola

== Annelids ==
Extinct species

- Japan's earthworm (Amynthas japonicus)
- Schmarda's earthworm (Tokea orthostichon)
- Lake Pedder earthworm (Hypolimnus pedderensis)

== Molluscs ==
=== Gastropods ===
Extinct species

- Achatinella abbreviata
- Achatinella buddii
- Achatinella caesia
- Achatinella casta
- Achatinella decora
- Achatinella dimorpha
- Achatinella elegans
- Achatinella juddii
- Achatinella juncea
- Achatinella lehuiensis
- Achatinella livida
- Achatinella papyracea
- Achatinella spaldingi
- Achatinella thaanumi
- Achatinella valida
- Advena campbelli
- Amastra albolabris
- Amastra cornea
- Amastra crassilabrum
- Amastra elongata
- Amastra forbesi
- Amastra pellucida
- Amastra porcus
- Amastra reticulata
- Amastra subrostrata
- Amastra subsoror
- Amastra tenuispira
- Amastra umbilicata
- Amphicyclotulus guadeloupensis
- Shoal sprite (Amphigyra alabamensis)
- Boulder snail (Athearnia crassa)
- Auriculella expansa
- Auriculella uniplicata
- Belgrandiella intermedia
- Bythinella gibbosa
- Bythinella limnopsis
- Bythinella mauritanica
- Bythinella microcochlia
- Bythinella punica
- Caldwellia philyrina
- Campolaemus perexilis
- Carelia anceophila
- Carelia bicolor
- Carelia cochlea
- Carelia cumingiana
- Carelia dolei
- Carelia evelynae
- Carelia glossema
- Carelia hyattiana
- Carelia kalalauensis
- Carelia knudseni
- Carelia lirata
- Carelia lymani
- Carelia mirabilis
- Carelia necra
- Carelia olivacea
- Carelia paradoxa
- Carelia periscelis
- Carelia pilsbryi
- Carelia sinclairi
- Carelia tenebrosa
- Carelia turricula
- Chilonopsis blofeldi
- Chilonopsis exulatus
- Chilonopsis helena
- Chilonopsis melanoides
- Great Saint Helena awl snail (Chilonopsis nonpareil)
- Chilonopsis subplicatus
- Chilonopsis subtruncatus
- Chilonopsis turtoni
- Cahaba pebblesnail (Clappia cahabensis)
- Umbilicate pebblesnail (Clappia umbilicata)
- Collisella edmitchelli
- Colparion madgei
- Ctenoglypta newtoni
- Cyclophorus horridulum
- Cyclosurus mariei
- Mount Matafao different snail (Diastole matafaoi)
- Dupontia proletaria
- Short-spired elimia (Elimia brevis)
- Closed elimia (Elimia clausa)
- Fusiform elimia (Elimia fusiformis)
- Shouldered elimia (Elimia gibbera)
- High-spired elimia (Elimia hartmaniana)
- Constricted elimia (Elimia impressa)
- Hearty elimia (Elimia jonesi)
- Teardrop elimia (Elimia lachryma)
- Ribbed elimia (Elimia laeta)
- Wrinkled elimia (Elimia macglameriana)
- Rough-lined elimia (Elimia pilsbryi)
- Pupa elimia (Elimia pupaeformis)
- Pygmy elimia (Elimia pygmaea)
- Cobble elimia (Elimia vanuxemiana)
- Erepta nevilli
- Fluvidona dulvertonensis
- Gastrocopta chichijimana
- Gastrocopta ogasawarana
- Gibbus lyonetianus
- Gonidomus newtoni
- Gonospira nevilli
- Graecoanatolica macedonica
- Gulella mayottensis
- Excised slitshell (Gyrotoma excisa)
- Striate slitshell (Gyrotoma lewisii)
- Pagoda slitshell (Gyrotoma pagoda)
- Ribbed slitshell (Gyrotoma pumila)
- Pyramid slitshell (Gyrotoma pyramidata)
- Round slitshell (Gyrotoma walkeri)
- Harmogenanina linophora
- Harmogenanina subdetecta
- Helenoconcha leptalea
- Helenoconcha minutissima
- Helenoconcha polyodon
- Helenoconcha pseustes
- Helenoconcha sexdentata
- Helenodiscus bilamellata
- Helenodiscus vernoni
- Heleobia spinellii
- Helicopsis paulhessei
- Hirasea planulata
- Hydrobia gracilis
- Incerticyclus cinereus
- Incerticyclus martinicensis
- Islamia ateni
- Lamellidea monodonta
- Lamellidea nakadai
- Leiorhagium solemi
- Leiostyla lamellosa
- Agate rocksnail (Leptoxis clipeata)
- Oblong rocksnail (Leptoxis compacta)
- Interrupted rocksnail (Leptoxis foremani)
- Maiden rocksnail (Leptoxis formosa)
- Rotund rocksnail (Leptoxis ligata)
- Lyrate rocksnail (Leptoxis lirata)
- Bigmouth rocksnail (Leptoxis occultata)
- Coosa rocksnail (Leptoxis showalterii)
- Squat rocksnail (Leptoxis torrefacta)
- Striped rocksnail (Leptoxis vittata)
- Leucocharis loyaltyensis
- Leucocharis porphyrocheila
- Libera subcavernula
- Libera tumuloides
- Littoraria flammea
- Littoridina gaudichaudii
- Eelgrass limpet (Lottia alveus)
- Lyropupa perlonga
- Olive marstonia (Marstonia olivacea)
- Mautodontha acuticosta
- Mautodontha consimilis
- Mautodontha consobrina
- Mautodontha maupiensis
- Mautodontha parvidens
- Mautodontha punctiperforata
- Mautodontha saintjohni
- Mautodontha subtilis
- Mautodontha unilamellata
- Mautodontha zebrina
- Megalobulimus cardosoi
- Mercuria letourneuxiana
- Nancibella quintalia
- Carinate flat-top snail (Neoplanorbis carinatus)
- Angled flat-top snail (Neoplanorbis smithii)
- Little flat-top snail (Neoplanorbis tantillus)
- Umbilicate flat-top snail (Neoplanorbis umbilicatus)
- Nesopupa turtoni
- Newcombia philippiana
- Ohridohauffenia drimica
- Oleacina guadeloupensis
- Omphalotropis plicosa
- Pachnodus curiosus
- Pachnodus ladiguensis
- Pachnodus velutinus
- Pachystyla rufozonata
- Panulena perrugosa
- Partula approximata
- Partula arguta
- Partula atilis
- Partula aurantia
- Partula auriculata
- Partula bilineata
- Partula callifera
- Partula candida
- Partula castanea
- Partula cedista
- Partula citrina
- Partula compacta
- Partula crassilabris
- Partula cuneata
- Partula cytherea
- Partula dolichostoma
- Partula dolorosa
- Partula eremita
- Partula exigua
- Partula faba
- Partula filosa
- Partula formosa
- Partula guamensis
- Polynesia tree snail (Partula imperforata)
- Partula labrusca
- Partula leptochila
- Partula levilineata
- Partula levistriata
- Partula lugubris
- Partula lutea
- Partula microstoma
- Partula navigatoria
- Partula ovalis
- Partula planilabrum
- Partula producta
- Partula protea
- Partula protracta
- Partula radiata
- Partula raiatensis
- Partula remota
- Partula robusta
- Partula rustica
- Partula sagitta
- Mount Alifana partula (Partula salifana)
- Partula thalia
- Partula turgida
- Partula umbilicata
- Partula variabilis
- Partula vittata
- Partulina crassa
- Partulina montagui
- Perdicella fulgurans
- Perdicella maniensis
- Perdicella zebra
- Perdicella zebrina
- Fish Lake physa (Physella microstriata)
- Placostylus cuniculinsulae
- Acorn ramshorn (Planorbella multivolvis)
- Plectostoma sciaphilum
- Pleurodonte desidens
- Posticobia norfolkensis
- Pseudamnicola barratei
- Pseudamnicola desertorum
- Pseudamnicola doumeti
- Pseudamnicola globulina
- Pseudamnicola latasteana
- Pseudamnicola oudrefica
- Pseudamnicola ragia
- Pseudamnicola singularis
- Pseudocampylaea loweii
- Pseudohelenoconcha spurca
- Pupilla obliquicosta
- Corded purg (Pyrgulopsis nevadensis)
- Quintalia flosculus
- Quintalia stoddartii
- Rhachis comorensis
- Rhachis sanguineus
- Aldabra banded snail (Rhachistia aldabrae)
- Samoana inflata
- Samoana jackieburchi
- Sinployea canalis
- Sinployea decorticata
- Sinployea harveyensis
- Sinployea otareae
- Sinployea planospira
- Sinployea proxima
- Sinployea rudis
- Sinployea tenuicostata
- Sinployea youngi
- Ouachita pebblesnail (Somatogyrus amnicoloides)
- Thick-lipped pebblesnail (Somatogyrus crassilabris)
- Channeled pebblesnail (Somatogyrus wheeleri)
- Fish springs marshsnail (Stagnicola pilsbryi)
- Taipidon anceyana
- Taipidon marquesana
- Taipidon octolamellata
- Thaumatodon multilamellata
- Tomigerus gibberulus
- Tomigerus turbinatus
- Tornelasmias capricorni
- Trochoidea picardi
- Tropidophora desmazuresi
- Tropidophora semilineata
- Vitrinula chaunax
- Vitrinula chichijimana
- Vitrinula hahajimana

Possibly extinct species

- Aaadonta angaurana
- Aaadonta kinlochi
- Aaadonta pelewana
- Alzoniella galaica
- Beddomeia tumida
- Belgrandia moitessieri
- Belgrandia varica
- Belgrandiella boetersi
- Belgrandiella cavernica
- Belgrandiella kreisslorum
- Belgrandiella multiformis
- Bulimulus achatellinus
- Bulimulus adelphus
- Bulimulus deridderi
- Bulimulus duncanus
- Bulimulus eos
- Bulimulus lycodus
- Bulimulus saeronius
- Bulimulus sp. nov. 'josevillani'
- Bulimulus sp. nov. 'krameri'
- Bulimulus sp. nov. 'nilsodhneri'
- Bulimulus sp. nov. 'tuideroyi'
- Bulimulus sp. nov. 'vanmoli'
- Bulimulus tanneri
- Bythinella eutrepha
- Bythiospeum dubium
- Bythiospeum gonostoma
- Bythiospeum putei
- Bythiospeum turritum
- Coneuplecta turrita
- Conturbatia crenata
- Delos gardineri
- Dianella schlickumi
- Diplommatina alata
- Diplommatina aurea
- Diplommatina gibboni
- Discula lyelliana
- Discula tetrica
- Mossy elimia (Elimia troostiana)
- Endodonta apiculata
- Eua globosa
- Falsipyrgula beysehirana
- Gabbiella matadina
- Geomitra delphinuloides
- Geomitra grabhami
- Graecoanatolica brevis
- Graecoanatolica conica
- Hemicycla modesta
- Henrigirardia wienini
- Hydrobia anatolica
- Iglica gratulabunda
- Islamia bendidis
- Islamia graeca
- Islamia hadei
- Islamia pseudorientalica
- Islamia zermanica
- Kirelia carinata
- Kubaryia pilikia
- Lauopa mbalavuana
- Leiostyla abbreviata
- Leiostyla cassida
- Leiostyla gibba
- Leiostyla simulator
- Madgeaconcha sevathiani
- Margarya yangtsunghaiensis
- Ozark pyrg (Marstonia ozarkensis)
- Melanoides agglutinans
- Melanopsis germaini
- Melanopsis infracincta
- Melanopsis khabourensis
- Melanopsis pachya
- Mercuria punica
- Monilearia pulverulenta
- Montserratina becasis
- Neritina tiassalensis
- Ohridohauffenia minuta
- Omphalotropis ingens
- Opisthostoma decrespignyi
- Opisthostoma otostoma
- Paladilhiopsis janinensis
- Palaina albata
- Palaina patula
- Palaina platycheilus
- Palaina pupa
- Partula guamensis
- Partula leucothoe
- Partula milleri
- Placostylus koroensis
- Plectostoma charasense
- Plectostoma dindingensis
- Plectostoma turriforme
- Potamopyrgus acus
- Pseudogibbula cara
- Samoana cramptoni
- Sardohoratia sulcata
- Soapitia dageti
- Stocky pebblesnail (Somatogyrus crassus)
- Tennessee pebblesnail (Somatogyrus currierianus)
- Fluted pebblesnail (Somatogyrus hendersoni)
- Atlas pebblesnail (Somatogyrus humerosus)
- Dwarf pebblesnail (Somatogyrus nanus)
- Spiralix corsica
- Thickshell pondsnail (Stagnicola utahensis)
- Succinea rotumana
- Tanousia zrmanjae
- Brune's tryonia (Tryonia brunei)
- Valvatorbis mauritii
- Zaumia sanctizaumi
- Zingis radiolata

Extinct in the wild species

- Aylacostoma chloroticum
- Aylacostoma guaraniticum
- Aylacostoma stigmaticum
- Partula dentifera
- Partula faba
- Partula mirabilis
- Partula mooreana
- Partula nodosa
- Partula rosea
- Sutural partula (Partula suturalis)
- Partula tohiveana
- Partula tristis
- Partula varia

Extinct subspecies

- Achatinella apexfulva vittata
- Achatinella bulimoides rosea
- Partula suturalis suturalis
- Partula taeniata taeniata
- Placostylus bivaricosus etheridgei

Extinct in the wild subspecies

- Partula suturalis strigosa
- Partula suturalis vexillum
- Partula taeniata elongata
- Partula taeniata nucleola
- Partula taeniata simulans

=== Bivalvia ===
Extinct species

- Coosa elktoe (Alasmidonta mccordi)
- Carolina elktoe (Alasmidonta robusta)
- Ochlockonee arcmussel (Alasmidonta wrightiana)
- Chambardia letourneuxi
- Arc-form pearly mussel (Epioblasma arcaeformis)
- Angled riffleshell (Epioblasma biemarginata)
- Arcuate pearly mussel (Epioblasma flexuosa)
- Acorn pearly mussel (Epioblasma haysiana)
- Narrow catspaw (Epioblasma lenior)
- Forkshell (Epioblasma lewisii)
- Fine-rayed pearly mussel (Epioblasma personata)
- Nearby pearly mussel (Epioblasma propinqua)
- Sampson's naiad (Epioblasma sampsonii)
- Cumberland leafshell (Epioblasma stewardsonii)
- Turgid riffle shell (Epioblasma turgidula)
- Lined pocketbook (Lampsilis binominata)
- Tombigbee moccasinshell (Medionidus mcglameriae)
- Highnut (Pleurobema altum)
- Hazel pigtoe (Pleurobema avellanum)
- Scioto pigtoe (Pleurobema bournianum)
- Yellow pigtoe (Pleurobema flavidulum)
- Brown pigtoe (Pleurobema hagleri)
- Alabama pigtoe (Pleurobema johannis)
- Coosa pigtoe (Pleurobema murrayense)
- Longnut (Pleurobema nucleopsis)
- Ovate clubshell (Pleurobema perovatum)
- Alabama clubshell (Pleurobema troschelianum)
- True pigtoe (Pleurobema verum)
- Unio cariei

Possibly extinct species

- Cuneopsis demangei
- Dreissena caspia
- Southern acorn riffle shell (Epioblasma othcaloogensis)
- Lamprotula crassa
- Lamprotula liedtkei
- Lamprotula nodulosa
- Haddleton lampmussel (Obovaria haddletoni)
- Black clubshell (Pleurobema curtum)

Extinct subspecies

- Yellow-blossom (Epioblasma florentina florentina)
- Epioblasma torulosa gubernaculum
- Tubercled-blossom pearly mussel (Epioblasma torulosa torulosa)

== Cnidaria ==
Possibly extinct species

- Millepora boschmai
- Wellington's solitary coral (Rhizopsammia wellingtoni)

== Arthropods ==
=== Centipedes ===
Possibly extinct species

- Mecistocephalus cyclops
- Mecistocephalus sechellarum

=== Seed shrimps ===
Extinct species

- Liocypris grandis

=== Arachnids ===
Extinct species

- Centrobunus braueri
- Gardiner's giant mite (Dicrogonatus gardineri)
- Hirstienus nanus
- Metazalmoxis ferruginea
- Peromona erinacea
- Pleorotus braueri
- Sitalcicus gardineri
- Stipax triangulifer
- Thomasettia seychellana

Possibly extinct species

- Afrogarypus seychellesensis
- Biantes parvulus
- Euso muehlenbergi
- Gamasomorpha austera
- Holozoster ovalis
- Ibalonius lomani
- Idioctis intertidalis
- Mitraceras crassipalpum
- Moneta coercervea
- Nesiergus gardineri
- Nesiergus halophilus
- Paccius quadridentatus
- Seychellia lodoiceae
- Sitalcicus incertus
- Steriphopus lacertosus
- Voraptus tenellus

=== Millipedes ===
Extinct species

- Eucarlia alluaudi
- Orthomorpha crinita
- Spirobolellus praslinus

Possibly extinct species

- Diglossosternoides curiosus
- Rhinotus albifrons
- Spirobolellus simplex

=== Entognatha ===
Possibly extinct species

- Ceratophysella sp. nov. 'HC'
- Delamarephorura tami

=== Maxillopoda ===
Extinct species

- Afrocyclops pauliani
- Tropodiaptomus ctenopus

=== Malacostracans ===
Includes crabs, lobsters, crayfish, shrimp, krill, woodlice, and many others.

Extinct species

- Cambarellus alvarezi
- Macrobrachium leptodactylus
- Sooty crayfish (Pacifastacus nigrescens)
- Sandhills crayfish (Procambarus angustatus)
- Rubious cave amphipod (Stygobromus lucifugus)
- Pasadena freshwater shrimp (Syncaris pasadenae)

Possibly extinct species

- Atya brachyrhinus
- Cambarellus areolatus
- White spring cave crayfish (Cambarus veitchorum)
- Caridina apodosis
- Caridina yilong
- Cryphiops luscus
- Macrobrachium denticulatum
- Macrobrachium oxyphilus
- Macrobrachium purpureamanus
- Macrobrachium scorteccii
- Florida cave shrimp (Palaemonetes cummingi)
- Perbrinckia gabadagei
- Big-cheeked cave crayfish (Procambarus delicatus)
- Procambarus paradoxus
- Sinodina acutipoda
- Strengeriana antioquensis
- Tehuana veracruzana

Extinct in the wild species

- Socorro isopod (Thermosphaeroma thermophilum)

=== Insects ===
Extinct species

- Pecatonica river mayfly (Acanthametropus pecatonica)
- Poko noctuid moth (Agrotis crinigera)
- Midway noctuid moth (Agrotis fasciata)
- Kerr's noctuid moth (Agrotis kerri)
- Laysan noctuid moth (Agrotis laysanensis)
- Agrotis photophila
- Procellaris grotis noctuid moth (Agrotis procellaris)
- Robert's stonefly (Alloperla roberti)
- Chestnut ermine moth (Argyresthia castaneela)
- Campsicnemus mirabilis
- Clavicoccus erinaceus
- Coleophora leucochrysella
- Central Valley grasshopper (Conozoa hyalina)
- Deloneura immaculata
- Drosophila lanaiensis
- Dryophthorus distinguendus
- American chestnut moth (Ectodemia castaneae)
- Phleophagan chestnut moth (Ectodemia phleophaga)
- Genophantis leahi
- Xerces blue (Glaucopsyche xerces)
- Confused moth (Helicoverpa confusa)
- Minute noctuid moth (Helicoverpa minuta)
- Tobias' caddisfly (Hydropsyche tobiasi)
- Mono Lake diving beetle (Hygrotus artus)
- Laysan dropseed noctuid moth (Hypena laysanensis)
- Hilo noctuid moth (Hypena newelli)
- Lovegrass noctuid moth (Hypena plagiota)
- Kaholuamano noctuid moth (Hypena senicula)
- Saint Helena earwig (Labidura herculeana)
- Lepidochrysops hypopolia
- Levuana moth (Levuana iridescens)
- Libythea cinyras
- Margatteoidea amoena
- Mecodema punctellum
- Megadytes ducalis
- Maui upland damselfly (Megalagrion jugorum)
- Rocky Mountain locust (Melanoplus spretus)
- Antioch dunes shieldback katydid (Neduba extincta)
- Oeobia sp. nov.
- Laysan weevil (Oodemas laysanensis)
- Robust burrowing mayfly (Pentagenia robusta)
- Phyllococcus oahuensis
- Ridley's stick insect (Pseudobactricia ridleyi)
- Rhantus novacaledoniae
- Rhantus orbignyi
- Rhantus papuanus
- Castle Lake caddisfly (Rhyacophila amabilis)
- Rhyncogonus bryani
- Kona giant looper moth (Scotorythra megalophylla)
- Ko'olau giant looper moth (Scotorythra nesiotes)
- Perrin's cave beetle (Siettitia balsetensis)
- Stonemyia velutina
- Chestnut clearwing moth (Tischeria perplexa)
- Athens caddisfly (Triaenodes phalacris)
- Three-tooth caddisfly (Triaenodes tridonata)
- Fort ross weevil (Trigonoscuta rossi)
- Yorba linda weevil (Trigonoscuta yorbalindae)
- Ola'a peppered looper moth (Tritocleis microphylla)

Possibly extinct species

- Morogoro pretty grasshopper (Acanthothericles bicoloripes)
- Zanzibar giant forest grasshopper (Allaga ambigua)
- Spined dwarf mantis (Ameles fasciipennis)
- Andrena labiatula
- Usambara splendid grasshopper (Anischnansis burtti)
- Anisogomphus solitaris
- Balta crassivenosa
- Bombus rubriventris
- Togo red jewel (Chlorocypha jejuna)
- Morogoro monkey grasshopper (Chromomastax movogovodia)
- Mpwapwa silent grasshopper (Chromousambilla burtti)
- Maspalomas bow-legged grasshopper (Dericorys minutus)
- Disparoneura ramajana
- Drepanosticta adami
- Drepanosticta austeni
- Drepanosticta montana
- Drepanosticta submontana
- Enallagma maldivensis
- Kilosa noble grasshopper (Eupropacris abbreviata)
- Mlingano monkey grasshopper (Euschmidtia bidens)
- Burtt's monkey grasshopper (Euschmidtia burtti)
- Dirsh's monkey grasshopper (Euschmidtia dirshi)
- Phipps' monkey grasshopper (Euschmidtia phippsi)
- Dar-es-salaam monkey grasshopper (Euschmidtia viridifasciata)
- Gran Canaria bush-cricket (Evergoderes cabrerai)
- Heliogomphus lyratus
- Heliogomphus nietneri
- Heteragrion peregrinum
- Holocompsa pusilla
- Macromia flinti
- Megachile cypricola
- Molokai damselfly (Megalagrion molokaiense)
- Metaleptobasis gibbosa
- Nomada siciliensis
- Elusive skimmer (Orthetrum rubens)
- Palaemnema edmondi
- Zulu ambush katydid (Peringueyella zulu)
- Perissolestes remus
- Pieris wollastoni
- Seychelles shortwinged groundhopper (Procytettix fusiformis)
- Three-lobed bush-cricket (Rhacocleis trilobata)
- Sliferia similis
- Theganopteryx grisea
- Theganopteryx liturata
- Theganopteryx scotti
- Peringuey's seedpod shieldback (Thoracistus peringueyi)

Extinct in the wild species

- Oahu deceptor bush cricket (Leptogryllus deceptor)

== See also ==
- List of least concern invertebrates
- List of near threatened invertebrates
- List of vulnerable invertebrates
- List of endangered invertebrates
- List of critically endangered invertebrates
- List of data deficient invertebrates
