= List of recently extinct molluscs =

- Extinct in the wild (EW): 12 species
- Critically endangered (CR): 785 species
- Endangered (EN): 708 species
- Vulnerable (VU): 1,123 species
- Near threatened (NT, LR/cd): 823 species
- Least concern (LC): 3,526 species
- Data deficient (DD): 2,229 species
Mollusc species (IUCN, 2025.2)
- 9,502 extant species have been evaluated
- 7,273 of those are fully assessed (Note: excludes data deficient evaluations.)
- 4,358 are not threatened at present
- 2,915 to 5,144 are threatened (Note: Threatened comprises CR, EN and VU. Upper estimate additionally includes DD.)
- 308 to 476 are extinct or extinct in the wild:
  - 296 extinct (EX) species (Note: Chart omits extinct (EX) species)
  - 12 extinct in the wild (EW)
  - 167 possibly extinct [CR(PE)]
  - 1 possibly extinct in the wild [CR(PEW)]

As of February 2021, the International Union for Conservation of Nature (IUCN) lists 299 extinct species, 149 possibly extinct species, 14 extinct in the wild species, two possibly extinct in the wild species, eight extinct subspecies, one possibly extinct subspecies, and five extinct in the wild subspecies of mollusc.

== Gastropods ==
There are 267 extinct species, 134 possibly extinct species, 14 extinct in the wild species, two possibly extinct in the wild species, five extinct subspecies, one possibly extinct subspecies, and five extinct in the wild subspecies of gastropod evaluated by the IUCN.

=== Patellogastropoda ===
Extinct species

- Collisella edmitchelli
- Eelgrass limpet (Lottia alveus)

=== Stylommatophora ===
Includes the majority of land snails and slugs.

Extinct species

- Achatinella abbreviata
- Achatinella buddii
- Achatinella caesia
- Achatinella casta
- Achatinella decora
- Achatinella dimorpha
- Achatinella elegans
- Achatinella juddii
- Achatinella juncea
- Achatinella lehuiensis
- Achatinella livida
- Achatinella papyracea
- Achatinella spaldingi
- Achatinella thaanumi
- Achatinella valida
- Advena campbelli
- Amastra albolabris
- Amastra cornea
- Amastra crassilabrum
- Amastra elongata
- Amastra forbesi
- Amastra pellucida
- Amastra porcus
- Amastra reticulata
- Amastra subrostrata
- Amastra subsoror
- Amastra tenuispira
- Amastra umbilicata
- Auriculella expansa
- Auriculella uniplicata
- Caldwellia philyrina
- Campolaemus perexilis
- Carelia anceophila
- Carelia bicolor
- Carelia cochlea
- Carelia cumingiana
- Carelia dolei
- Carelia evelynae
- Carelia glossema
- Carelia hyattiana
- Carelia kalalauensis
- Carelia knudseni
- Carelia lirata
- Carelia lymani
- Carelia mirabilis
- Carelia necra
- Carelia olivacea
- Carelia paradoxa
- Carelia periscelis
- Carelia pilsbryi
- Carelia sinclairi
- Carelia tenebrosa
- Carelia turricula
- Chilonopsis blofeldi
- Chilonopsis exulatus
- Chilonopsis helena
- Chilonopsis melanoides
- Great Saint Helena awl snail (Chilonopsis nonpareil)
- Chilonopsis subplicatus
- Chilonopsis subtruncatus
- Chilonopsis turtoni
- Colparion madgei
- Ctenoglypta newtoni
- Mount Matafao different snail (Diastole matafaoi)
- Dupontia proletaria
- Erepta nevilli
- Gastrocopta chichijimana
- Gastrocopta ogasawarana
- Gibbus lyonetianus
- Gonidomus newtoni
- Gonospira nevilli
- Gulella mayottensis
- Harmogenanina linophora
- Harmogenanina subdetecta
- Helenoconcha leptalea
- Helenoconcha minutissima
- Helenoconcha polyodon
- Helenoconcha pseustes
- Helenoconcha sexdentata
- Helenodiscus bilamellata
- Helenodiscus vernoni
- Helicopsis paulhessei
- Hirasea planulata
- Lamellidea monodonta
- Lamellidea nakadai
- Leiostyla lamellosa
- Leucocharis loyaltyensis
- Leucocharis porphyrocheila
- Libera subcavernula
- Libera tumuloides
- Lyropupa perlonga
- Mautodontha acuticosta
- Mautodontha consimilis
- Mautodontha consobrina
- Mautodontha maupiensis
- Mautodontha parvidens
- Mautodontha punctiperforata
- Mautodontha saintjohni
- Mautodontha subtilis
- Mautodontha unilamellata
- Mautodontha zebrina
- Megalobulimus cardosoi
- Nancibella quintalia
- Nesopupa turtoni
- Newcombia philippiana
- Oleacina guadeloupensis
- Pachnodus curiosus
- Pachnodus ladiguensis
- Pachnodus velutinus
- Pachystyla rufozonata
- Panulena perrugosa
- Partula approximata
- Partula arguta
- Partula atilis
- Partula aurantia
- Partula auriculata
- Partula bilineata
- Partula callifera
- Partula candida
- Partula castanea
- Partula cedista
- Partula citrina
- Partula compacta
- Partula crassilabris
- Partula cuneata
- Partula cytherea
- Partula dolichostoma
- Partula dolorosa
- Partula eremita
- Partula exigua
- Partula faba
- Partula filosa
- Partula formosa
- Partula fusca
- Partula garretti
- Polynesia tree snail (Partula imperforata)
- Partula labrusca
- Partula leptochila
- Partula levilineata
- Partula levistriata
- Partula lugubris
- Partula lutea
- Partula microstoma
- Partula ovalis
- Partula planilabrum
- Partula producta
- Partula protea
- Partula protracta
- Partula radiata
- Partula raiatensis
- Partula remota
- Partula robusta
- Partula rustica
- Partula sagitta
- Mount Alifana partula (Partula salifana)
- Partula thalia
- Partula tristis
- Partula turgida
- Partula umbilicata
- Partula variabilis
- Partula vittata
- Partulina crassa
- Partulina montagui
- Perdicella fulgurans
- Perdicella maniensis
- Perdicella zebra
- Perdicella zebrina
- Placostylus cuniculinsulae
- Pleurodonte desidens
- Pseudocampylaea loweii
- Pseudohelenoconcha spurca
- Pupilla obliquicosta
- Quintalia flosculus
- Quintalia stoddartii
- Rhachis comorensis
- Rhachis sanguineus
- Samoana inflata
- Samoana jackieburchi
- Sinployea canalis
- Sinployea decorticata
- Sinployea harveyensis
- Sinployea otareae
- Sinployea planospira
- Sinployea proxima
- Sinployea rudis
- Sinployea tenuicostata
- Sinployea youngi
- Taipidon anceyana
- Taipidon marquesana
- Taipidon octolamellata
- Thaumatodon multilamellata
- Tomigerus gibberulus
- Tomigerus turbinatus
- Tornelasmias capricorni
- Trochoidea picardi
- Vitrinula chaunax
- Vitrinula chichijimana
- Vitrinula hahajimana

Possibly extinct species

- Aaadonta angaurana
- Aaadonta kinlochi
- Aaadonta pelewana
- Bulimulus achatellinus
- Bulimulus adelphus
- Bulimulus deridderi
- Bulimulus duncanus
- Bulimulus eos
- Bulimulus lycodus
- Bulimulus saeronius
- Bulimulus sp. 'josevillani'
- Bulimulus sp. 'krameri'
- Bulimulus sp. 'nilsodhneri'
- Bulimulus sp. 'tuideroyi'
- Bulimulus sp. 'vanmoli'
- Bulimulus tanneri
- Coneuplecta turrita
- Conturbatia crenata
- Delos gardineri
- Discula lyelliana
- Discula tetrica
- Endodonta apiculata
- Eua globosa
- Geomitra delphinuloides
- Geomitra grabhami
- Hemicycla modesta
- Lauopa mbalavuana
- Leiostyla abbreviata
- Leiostyla cassida
- Leiostyla gibba
- Leiostyla simulator
- Monilearia pulverulenta
- Montserratina becasis
- Partula guamensis
- Partula leucothoe
- Partula milleri
- Placostylus koroensis
- Samoana cramptoni
- Succinea rotumana
- Zingis radiolata

Extinct in the wild species

- Partula dentifera
- Partula hebe
- Partula mirabilis
- Partula mooreana
- Partula nodosa
- Partula rosea
- Sutural partula (Partula suturalis)
- Partula tohiveana
- Partula varia

Extinct subspecies

- Achatinella apexfulva vittata
- Achatinella bulimoides rosea
- Partula suturalis suturalis
- Partula taeniata taeniata
- Placostylus bivaricosus etheridgei

Extinct in the wild subspecies

- Partula suturalis strigosa
- Partula suturalis vexillum
- Partula taeniata elongata
- Partula taeniata nucleola
- Partula taeniata simulans

=== Littorinimorpha ===
Extinct species

- Belgrandiella intermedia
- Bythinella gibbosa
- Bythinella limnopsis
- Bythinella mauritanica
- Bythinella microcochlia
- Bythinella punica
- Cahaba pebblesnail (Clappia cahabensis)
- Umbilicate pebblesnail (Clappia umbilicata)
- Fluvidona dulvertonensis
- Graecoanatolica macedonica
- Heleobia spinellii
- Hydrobia gracilis
- Islamia ateni
- Leiorhagium solemi
- Littoraria flammea
- Littoridina gaudichaudii
- Olive marstonia (Marstonia olivacea)
- Mercuria letourneuxiana
- Ohridohauffenia drimica
- Omphalotropis plicosa
- Posticobia norfolkensis
- Pseudamnicola barratei
- Pseudamnicola desertorum
- Pseudamnicola doumeti
- Pseudamnicola globulina
- Pseudamnicola latasteana
- Pseudamnicola oudrefica
- Pseudamnicola ragia
- Pseudamnicola singularis
- Corded purg (Pyrgulopsis nevadensis)
- Reverse pebblesnail (Somatogyrus alcoviensis)
- Ouachita pebblesnail (Somatogyrus amnicoloides)
- Thick-lipped pebblesnail (Somatogyrus crassilabris)
- Channeled pebblesnail (Somatogyrus wheeleri)
- Tropidophora desmazuresi
- Tropidophora semilineata

Possibly extinct species

- Alzoniella galaica
- Beddomeia tumida
- Belgrandia moitessieri
- Belgrandia varica
- Belgrandiella boetersi
- Belgrandiella cavernica
- Belgrandiella kreisslorum
- Belgrandiella multiformis
- Bythinella eutrepha
- Bythiospeum dubium
- Bythiospeum gonostoma
- Bythiospeum putei
- Bythiospeum turritum
- Dianella schlickumi
- Falsipyrgula beysehirana
- Gabbiella matadina
- Graecoanatolica brevis
- Graecoanatolica conica
- Henrigirardia wienini
- Hydrobia anatolica
- Iglica gratulabunda
- Islamia bendidis
- Islamia graeca
- Islamia hadei
- Islamia pseudorientalica
- Islamia zermanica
- Kirelia carinata
- Kubaryia pilikia
- Beaver pond marstonia (Marstonia castor)
- Ozark pyrg (Marstonia ozarkensis)
- Mercuria punica
- Ohridohauffenia minuta
- Omphalotropis ingens
- Paladilhiopsis janinensis
- Potamopyrgus acus
- Pseudogibbula cara
- Sardohoratia sulcata
- Soapitia dageti
- Stocky pebblesnail (Somatogyrus crassus)
- Tennessee pebblesnail (Somatogyrus currierianus)
- Fluted pebblesnail (Somatogyrus hendersoni)
- Atlas pebblesnail (Somatogyrus humerosus)
- Dwarf pebblesnail (Somatogyrus nanus)
- Spiralix corsica
- Tanousia zrmanjae
- Brune's tryonia (Tryonia brunei)
- Valvatorbis mauritii
- Zaumia sanctizaumi

=== Sorbeoconcha ===
Extinct species

- Boulder snail (Athearnia crassa)
- Short-spired elimia (Elimia brevis)
- Closed elimia (Elimia clausa)
- Fusiform elimia (Elimia fusiformis)
- Shouldered elimia (Elimia gibbera)
- High-spired elimia (Elimia hartmaniana)
- Constricted elimia (Elimia impressa)
- Hearty elimia (Elimia jonesi)
- Teardrop elimia (Elimia lachryma)
- Ribbed elimia (Elimia laeta)
- Wrinkled elimia (Elimia macglameriana)
- Rough-lined elimia (Elimia pilsbryi)
- Pupa elimia (Elimia pupaeformis)
- Pygmy elimia (Elimia pygmaea)
- Cobble elimia (Elimia vanuxemiana)
- Excised slitshell (Gyrotoma excisa)
- Striate slitshell (Gyrotoma lewisii)
- Pagoda slitshell (Gyrotoma pagoda)
- Ribbed slitshell (Gyrotoma pumila)
- Pyramid slitshell (Gyrotoma pyramidata)
- Round slitshell (Gyrotoma walkeri)
- Agate rocksnail (Leptoxis clipeata)
- Oblong rocksnail (Leptoxis compacta)
- Interrupted rocksnail (Leptoxis foremani)
- Maiden rocksnail (Leptoxis formosa)
- Rotund rocksnail (Leptoxis ligata)
- Lyrate rocksnail (Leptoxis lirata)
- Bigmouth rocksnail (Leptoxis occultata)
- Coosa rocksnail (Leptoxis showalterii)
- Squat rocksnail (Leptoxis torrefacta)
- Striped rocksnail (Leptoxis vittata)

Possibly extinct species

- Mossy elimia (Elimia troostiana)
- Melanoides agglutinans
- Melanopsis germaini
- Melanopsis infracincta
- Melanopsis khabourensis
- Melanopsis pachya

Extinct in the wild species

- Aylacostoma chloroticum
- Aylacostoma guaraniticum
- Aylacostoma stigmaticum

=== Architaenioglossa ===
Extinct species

- Amphicyclotulus guadeloupensis
- Cyclophorus horridulum
- Cyclosurus mariei
- Incerticyclus cinereus
- Incerticyclus martinicensis
- Plectostoma sciaphilum

Possibly extinct species

- Diplommatina alata
- Diplommatina aurea
- Diplommatina gibboni
- Madgeaconcha sevathiani
- Margarya yangtsunghaiensis
- Opisthostoma decrespignyi
- Opisthostoma otostoma
- Palaina albata
- Palaina patula
- Palaina platycheilus
- Palaina pupa
- Plectostoma charasense
- Plectostoma dindingensis
- Plectostoma turriforme

=== Cycloneritimorpha ===
Possibly extinct species

- Neritina tiassalensis

=== Hygrophila species ===
Extinct species

- Shoal sprite (Amphigyra alabamensis)
- Carinate flat-top snail (Neoplanorbis carinatus)
- Angled flat-top snail (Neoplanorbis smithii)
- Little flat-top snail (Neoplanorbis tantillus)
- Umbilicate flat-top snail (Neoplanorbis umbilicatus)
- Fish Lake physa (Physella microstriata)
- Acorn ramshorn (Planorbella multivolvis)
- Fish springs marshsnail (Stagnicola pilsbryi)

Possibly extinct species

- Thickshell pondsnail (Stagnicola utahensis)

== Bivalvia ==
There are 32 extinct species, 15 possibly extinct species, and three extinct subspecies of bivalve evaluated by the IUCN.

Extinct species

- Coosa elktoe (Alasmidonta mccordi)
- Carolina elktoe (Alasmidonta robusta)
- Ochlockonee arcmussel (Alasmidonta wrightiana)
- Chambardia letourneuxi
- Arc-form pearly mussel (Epioblasma arcaeformis)
- Angled riffleshell (Epioblasma biemarginata)
- Arcuate pearly mussel (Epioblasma flexuosa)
- Acorn pearly mussel (Epioblasma haysiana)
- Narrow catspaw (Epioblasma lenior)
- Forkshell (Epioblasma lewisii)
- Fine-rayed pearly mussel (Epioblasma personata)
- Nearby pearly mussel (Epioblasma propinqua)
- Sampson's naiad (Epioblasma sampsonii)
- Cumberland leafshell (Epioblasma stewardsonii)
- Turgid riffle shell (Epioblasma turgidula)
- Lined pocketbook (Lampsilis binominata)
- Tombigbee moccasinshell (Medionidus mcglameriae)
- Highnut (Pleurobema altum)
- Hazel pigtoe (Pleurobema avellanum)
- Scioto pigtoe (Pleurobema bournianum)
- Yellow pigtoe (Pleurobema flavidulum)
- Brown pigtoe (Pleurobema hagleri)
- Alabama pigtoe (Pleurobema johannis)
- Coosa pigtoe (Pleurobema murrayense)
- Longnut (Pleurobema nucleopsis)
- Ovate clubshell (Pleurobema perovatum)
- Alabama clubshell (Pleurobema troschelianum)
- True pigtoe (Pleurobema verum)
- Unio cariei

Possibly extinct species

- Cuneopsis demangei
- Dreissena caspia
- Southern acorn riffle shell (Epioblasma othcaloogensis)
- Lamprotula crassa
- Lamprotula liedtkei
- Lamprotula nodulosa
- Haddleton lampmussel (Obovaria haddletoni)
- Black clubshell (Pleurobema curtum)

Extinct subspecies

- Yellow-blossom (Epioblasma florentina florentina)
- Epioblasma torulosa gubernaculum
- Tubercled-blossom pearly mussel (Epioblasma torulosa torulosa)

== See also ==
- List of least concern molluscs
- List of near threatened molluscs
- List of vulnerable molluscs
- List of endangered molluscs
- List of critically endangered molluscs
- List of data deficient molluscs
