= List of Hawaiian species extinct in the Holocene =

Location of Hawaii in the Pacific Ocean.

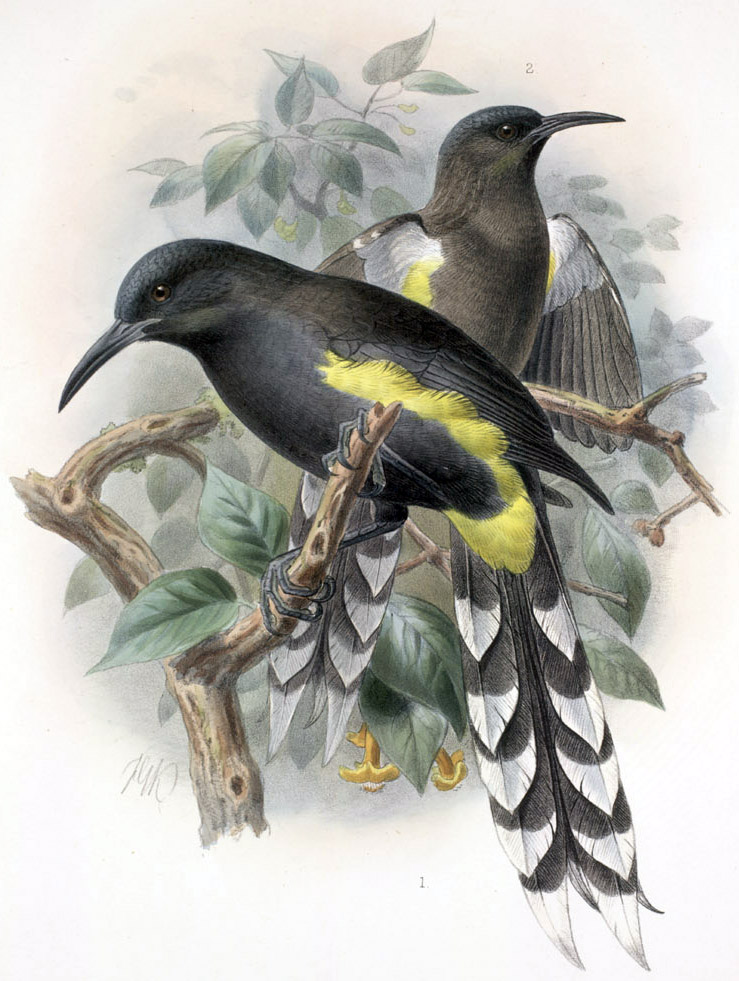
The O'ahu 'ō'ō (Moho apicalis) is among dozens of bird species that became extinct after the human settlement of Hawaii.

This is a list of Hawaiian animal species extinct in the Holocene that covers extinctions from the Holocene epoch, a geologic epoch that began about 11,650 years before present (about 9700 BCE) (Note: The source gives "11,700 calendar yr b2k (before CE 2000)". But "BP" means before 1950 CE. Therefore, the Holocene began 11,650 BP. Doing the math, that is c. 9700 BCE.) and continues to the present day.

The Hawaiian Islands include the eight major islands (the Windward Islands) and the small islands and atolls of the Northwestern Hawaiian Islands. They are all part of the U.S. state of Hawaii, except Midway Atoll, which is a separate U.S. territory.

The islands of East Polynesia (including New Zealand, Hawaii, and Easter Island) were among the last habitable places on earth colonized by humans. Estimates for the timing of Polynesian settlement in Hawaii have been uncertain, but a 2010 study based on radiocarbon dates of more reliable samples suggests that Hawaii was first settled by humans roughly between 1219 and 1266 CE. In 1778, British explorer James Cook became the first recorded European to arrive in Hawaii. An influx of European and American explorers, traders, and whalers arrived shortly after. Hawaii was annexed by the United States in 1898 and became a state in 1959.

Numerous species have disappeared from Hawaii as part of the ongoing Holocene extinction, driven by human activity. Human contact, first by Polynesians and later by Europeans, had a significant impact on the environment. Both the Polynesians and Europeans cleared native forests and introduced non-indigenous species for agriculture (or by accident), driving many endemic species to extinction. Fossil finds in caves, lava tubes, and sand dunes have revealed that Hawaii once had a native eagle, two raven-size crows, several bird-eating owls, and giant ducks known as moa-nalo. Today, many of Hawaii's remaining endemic species of plants and animals are considered endangered. Hawaii has more endangered species and has lost a higher percentage of its endemic species than any other U.S. state. The endemic plant Brighamia now requires hand pollination because its natural pollinator is presumed to be extinct.

This list of extinct species only includes the indigenous biota of Hawaii, not domestic animals like the Hawaiian Poi Dog. Many extinction dates are unknown due to a lack of relevant information.

== Mammals (class Mammalia) ==
=== Bats (order Chiroptera) ===
==== Vesper bats (family Vespertilionidae) ====
Scientific name	Range	Comments
Synemporion keana	Kauai, Oahu, Molokai, Maui, and Hawaii (island)	Might have become extinct around the 10th century.

== Birds (class Aves) ==
=== Waterfowl (order Anseriformes) ===
==== Ducks, geese, and swans (family Anatidae) ====
Common name	Scientific name	Range	Comments	Pictures
Nēnē-nui	Branta hylobadistes	Maui, possibly Oahu and Kauai	Most recent remains dated to 1046-1380.	
Giant Hawaiʻi goose	Branta rhuax	Hawaii (island)	Most recent remains dated to 1380-1500.	
Turtle-jawed moa-nalo	Chelychelynechen quassus	Kauai	Only known from subfossil remains.	
Small-billed moa-nalo	Ptaiochen pau	Maui	Known from subfossil remains. It was possibly restricted to montane habitat, while the lowlands were occupied by the Maui Nui large-billed moa-nalo. Likely disappeared due to a combination of hunting and predation or competition with introduced mammals.	(right)
Kauaʻi mole duck	Talpanas lippa	Kauai	Most recent remains dated to 3540-3355 BCE. Being a flightless, nocturnal, almost-blind species convergent with New Zealand's kiwi, it was likely very vulnerable to hunting and predation by introduced animals.	
Oʻahu moa-nalo	Thambetochen xanion	Oahu	Most recent remains dated to 440-639 CE. It possibly disappeared due to a combination of hunting, habitat loss, and nest-predation by introduced mammals.	
Maui Nui large-billed moa-nalo	Thambetochen chauliodous	Maui and Molokai	Most recent remains dated to 1057-1375. It occupied low altitudes while the small-billed moa-nalo lived at higher elevations. It likely disappeared due to hunting, and nest predation by Polynesian rats.	(left)
Giant Oʻahu goose	Anatidae sp. et gen. indet.	Oahu	Prehistoric	
Long-legged shelduck	Anatidae sp. et gen. indet.	Kauai	Prehistoric	

=== Rails and cranes (order Gruiformes) ===
==== Rails (family Rallidae) ====
Common name	Scientific name	Range	Comments	Pictures
Kepler's crake	Zapornia keplerorum	Maui	Known from subfossil remains.	
Molokai crake	Zapornia menehune	Molokai	Known from subfossil remains.	
Laysan rail	Zapornia palmeri	Laysan	Disappeared from Laysan in 1923 after feral rabbits ate all the vegetation in the island. Previously, the species was introduced to other islands in an attempt to save it from extinction, establishing successful populations in Midway (Eastern and Sand islands). In 1943, military construction in Midway accidentally introduced black rats, which exterminated the rails by either June 1944 or June 1945.	
Hawaiian rail	Zapornia sandwichensis	Hawaii (island)	Last collected in 1864; claims of further survival are unsubstantiated. The nominate subspecies Z. s. sandwichensis lived on the leeward side of the island of Hawaii and the subspecies Z. s. millsi on the windward side. It coexisted peacefully with the Polynesian rat but might have been driven to extinction by the black rat. Mongooses were blamed by some authors, but they were not introduced to the island until 1883. Hunting, deforestation, predation by pigs, cats, and dogs, and introduced diseases from poultry may have been contributing factors to its extinction.	
Great Maui crake	Porzana severnsi	Maui	Known from subfossil remains.	
Great Oʻahu crake	Porzana ralphorum	Oʻahu	Known from subfossil remains. It was apparently limited to lowland areas while Ziegler's crake occupied the highlands, which would make it even more vulnerable to human settlement than other flightless rails.	
Small Oʻahu crake	Zapornia ziegleri	Oʻahu	Most recent remains dated to 650-869 CE.	
Great Hawaiian crake	"Porzana" sp.	Hawaii (island)	All prehistoric.	
Great Kauaʻi crake	"Porzana" sp.	Kauai	All prehistoric.	
Medium Kauaʻi crake	"Porzana" sp.	Kauai	All prehistoric.	
Medium Maui crake	"Porzana" sp.	Maui	All prehistoric.	
Small Hawaiian crake	"Porzana" sp.	Hawaii (island)	All prehistoric.	

=== Shorebirds (order Charadriiformes) ===
==== Gulls, terns, and skimmers (family Laridae) ====
Common name	Scientific name	Range	Comments
Kauaʻi gull	Larus sp.	Kauai	Known from mid-Holocene remains. There are no resident gull species in Kauai's modern fauna, though the laughing gull and others occur accidentally.

=== Albatrosses and petrels (order Procellariiformes) ===
==== Petrels and shearwaters (family Procellariidae) ====
Common name	Scientific name	Range	Comments
Oʻahu petrel	Pterodroma jugabilis	Hawaii (island) and Oahu	Known from subfossil remains found in archaeological assemblages, because of this it is believed that it was hunted by people. It has no close living relatives.

=== Pelicans, herons, and ibises (order Pelecaniformes) ===
==== Ibises and spoonbills (family Threskiornithidae) ====
Common name	Scientific name	Range	Comments	Pictures
Maui highland ibis	Apteribis brevis	Maui	Most recent remains dated to 170 BCE - 370 CE.	
Molokaʻi ibis	Apteribis glenos	Molokai	Prehistoric	
Maui lowland ibis	Apteribis sp.	Maui	Prehistoric	
Lānaʻi ibis	Apteribis sp.	Lanai	Prehistoric	

=== Hawks and relatives (order Accipitriformes) ===
==== Hawks, eagles, kites, harriers and Old World vultures (family Accipitridae) ====
Common name	Scientific name	Range	Comments
Wood harrier	Circus dossenus	Molokai and Oahu	Adapted to hunting birds in closed forests, with short wings more similar to sparrowhawks in the Accipiter genus than other harriers. It likely disappeared due to forest clearing by Polynesians.

===== Locally extinct =====
Common name	Scientific name	Range	Comments	Pictures
White-tailed eagle	Haliaeetus albicilla	Extant in temperate Eurasia; extinct in Oahu, Molokai, and Maui	Holocene eagle fossils have been found on Oahu, Molokai, and Maui. The absence of eagle fossils from other Hawaiian islands might represent a true gap in distribution or a deficiency in the fossil record. The fossils are called the Hawaiian eagle in sources. Based on DNA research, these fossils represent the white-tailed eagle (Haliaeetus albicilla) or a very close relative. The Hawaiian eagle was an isolated, resident population in Hawaii for more than 100,000 years, where it was the largest terrestrial predator. Its extinction could have been related to human-induced ecological changes, although there is currently no direct evidence for temporal overlap with humans.	

=== Owls (order Strigiformes) ===
==== True owls (family Strigidae) ====
Common name	Scientific name	Range	Comments
Kauaʻi stilt-owl	Grallistrix auceps	Kauai	Most recent remains dated to 744-202 BCE.
Maui stilt-owl	Grallistrix erdmani	Maui	Most recent remains dated to 1057-1440 CE.
Molokaʻi stilt-owl	Grallistrix geleches	Molokai	Prehistoric
Oʻahu stilt-owl	Grallistrix orion	Oahu	Prehistoric

=== Perching birds (order Passeriformes) ===
==== Crows and relatives (family Corvidae) ====
Common name	Scientific name	Range	Comments	Pictures
High-billed crow	Corvus impluviatus	Oahu	Prehistoric	
Robust crow	Corvus viriosus	Oahu and Molokai	Prehistoric	

===== Extinct in the wild =====
Common name	Scientific name	Range	Comments	Pictures
Hawaiian crow	Corvus hawaiiensis	Hawaii (island) and Maui	Historically recorded on the island of Hawaii, where it was persecuted as a nuisance during the 19th century. Fossils indicate that this species or a very similar one was also found on Maui before European contact. The last wild pairs bred on the slopes of the Mauna Loa in 1992, by which time there were only 11 or 12 individuals left. One egg was laid in 1996 but didn't hatch, and the last pair was sighted in 2002. A captive population exists, but a release program in 1993-1999 ended in failure.	

==== Reed warblers (family Acrocephalidae) ====
Common name	Scientific name	Range	Comments	Pictures
Laysan millerbird	Acrocephalus familiaris familiaris	Laysan	Last recorded in 1913. It likely disappeared due to habitat destruction caused by feral rabbits, which were introduced in 1904 and destroyed the vegetation almost completely by 1920.	

==== Hawaiian honeyeaters (family Mohoidae) ====
Common name	Scientific name	Range	Comments	Pictures
Kioea	Chaetoptila angustipluma	Hawaii (island), Oahu, and Maui	The last individual was collected on the island of Hawaii in 1859. Fossils indicate that this species or a very similar one was also found on Maui and Oahu before European contact. Deforestation, hunting, and introduced predators likely contributed to its extinction.	
Narrow-billed kioea	?Chaetoptila sp.	Maui	Known from subfossil remains. The species coexisted with the Hawaiian kioea, but had a much narrower bill.	
Oʻahu ʻōʻō	Moho apicalis	Oahu	Last recorded in 1837. Presumably extinct due to habitat destruction and the introduction of disease-carrying mosquitos.	Oʻahu ʻōʻō
Bishop's ʻōʻō	Moho bishopi	Maui, Lanai, and Molokai	Last recorded on Molokai in 1904, with unconfirmed reports lasting until 1915. A bird thought to be this species was observed on Maui in 1981. It declined due to habitat destruction for agriculture and grazing feral mammals, before being wiped out by introduced black rats and diseases carried by mosquitos.	
Kauaʻi ʻōʻō	Moho braccatus	Kauai	Though common before the 1890s, it became restricted to the Alakaʻi Wilderness Preserve by the 1970s, and a single pair survived by 1981. The female disappeared when Hurricane Iwa struck Kauai in 1982, and the male was recorded singing in solitary until 1987. The species likely declined due to habitat destruction, predation by introduced black rats and feral pigs, as well as disease-carrying mosquitos.	
Hawaiʻi ʻōʻō	Moho nobilis	Hawaii (island)	Last seen in 1934. Presumably disappeared due to habitat destruction and disease.	

==== Thrushes (family Turdidae) ====
Common name	Scientific name	Range	Comments	Pictures
Kāmaʻo	Myadestes myadestinus	Kauai	Last reliably sighted in 1985, with unconfirmed sightings until 1991. Likely causes of extinction include disease carried by introduced mosquitos, deforestation and degradation of forests by feral pigs.	
ʻĀmaui	Myadestes woahensis	Oahu	Known from a single individual collected in 1825 and fossil remains. The cause of extinction is unknown, though habitat destruction and avian malaria are suspected.	

===== Possibly extinct =====
Common name	Scientific name	Range	Comments	Pictures
Olomaʻo	Myadestes lanaiensis	Maui, Lanai and Molokai	Possibly disappeared from Maui in the 19th century. It was last seen in Lanai in 1933, and the last reliable sighting in Molokai happened in 1980 though there were unconfirmed reports in 1988, 1994, and 2005. It could have been driven extinct by diseases spread by introduced mosquitos and habitat destruction.	

==== True finches (family Fringillidae) ====
Common name	Scientific name	Range	Comments	Pictures
Oʻahu icterid-like gaper	Aidemedia chascax	Oahu	Prehistoric	
Maui Nui icterid-like gaper	Aidemedia lutetiae	Maui and Molokai	Prehistoric	
Sickle-billed gaper	Aidemedia zanclops	Oahu	Prehistoric	
Oʻahu ʻakialoa	Akialoa ellisiana	Oahu	The species is known from only two specimens collected in 1837, although there were undocumented reports in 1937 and 1940. Thought to have been driven to extinction by habitat destruction and disease.	
Maui Nui ʻakialoa	Akialoa lanaiensis	Maui, Lanai and Molokai	Named from three individuals collected on Lanai in 1892; fossils have also been found on Molokai and Maui. The species is thought to have been driven to extinction by habitat destruction, disease, and possibly introduced species.	
Lesser ʻakialoa	Akialoa obscura	Hawaii (island)	Last reported in 1940. Likely extinct due to deforestation and introduced diseases.	
Kauaʻi ʻakialoa	Akialoa stejnegeri	Kauai	Last reported in 1969. Extinct due to forest clearance and introduced disease.	
Hoopoe-billed ʻakialoa	Akialoa upupirostris	Oahu and Kauai	Prehistoric	
Giant ʻakialoa	Akialoa sp.	Hawaii (island)	Prehistoric	
	Akialoa sp.	Maui	Prehistoric	
Kona grosbeak	Chloridops kona	Hawaii (island)	Restricted to about four square miles by the time of its discovery in the late 19th century, it was last collected in 1894. The reasons of extinction are unknown, but may include habitat destruction, introduced mammalian predators, and avian malaria.	
King Kong grosbeak	Chloridops regiskongi	Oahu	Prehistoric	
Wahi grosbeak	Chloridops wahi	Maui and Oahu	Prehistoric. Might include the Kauaʻi grosbeak (Chloridops sp.).	
Kauaʻi grosbeak	Chloridops sp.	Kauai	Prehistoric. Might be synonymous with the Wahi grosbeak (Chloridops wahi).	
Maui grosbeak	Chloridops sp.	Maui	Prehistoric	
ʻUla-ʻai-hawane	Ciridops anna	Hawaii (island)	Last collected in 1892, there was an unconfirmed sighting in 1937. The causes of extinction are unknown, but deforestation, malaria, and predation by introduced rats may have been contributing factors.	
Stout-legged finch	Ciridops tenax	Kauai	Known from subfossil remains. Likely extinct due to habitat destruction and hunting for feathers by Polynesians.	
Molokaʻi ʻula-ʻai-hawane	Ciridops cf. anna	Molokai	Prehistoric	
Oʻahu ʻula-ʻai-hawane	Ciridops sp.	Oahu	Prehistoric	
Black mamo	Drepanis funerea	Maui and Molokai	Last collected in Molokai in 1907; fossils are known from Maui. It probably disappeared due to destruction of its understorey habitat by introduced cattle and deer, and predation by rats and mongooses.	
Hawaiʻi mamo	Drepanis pacifica	Hawaii (island)	Last recorded in 1898. Although heavily trapped for its feathers, it was likely driven to extinction ultimately by habitat destruction and disease.	
Lānaʻi hookbill	Dysmorodrepanis munroi	Lanai	Only known from a single specimen collected in 1913 and single sightings in 1916 and 1918. Presumably driven to extinction by clearing forests for pineapple plantation, predation by cats and rats.	
Maui nukupuʻu	Hemignathus affinis	Maui	Last confirmed specimens taken in 1896, and last record considered genuine by the USFWS was in 1996. The species's forest habitat has been eliminated for cattle ranching or otherwise degraded by introduced ungulates, which also spread alien plants and disease-carrying mosquitos. Predation and competition with introduced birds and insects has also been suggested.	
Kauaʻi nukupuʻu	Hemignathus hanapepe	Kauai	Last confirmed sighting in 1899, with unconfirmed records in 1984-1998 and 2007. The more recent observations could actually belong to the Kauaʻi ʻamakihi. It possibly declined due to habitat degradation by introduced ungulates, disease, predation and competition with exotic birds and insects.	
Oʻahu nukupuʻu	Hemignathus lucidus	Oahu	The last two preserved individuals were collected either during an expedition in 1838 or another in 1840-1841, though native accounts suggest it was still present in 1860. A second-hand report from 1939 is "doubtlessly incorrect".	
Giant nukupuʻu	Hemignathus vorpalis	Hawaii (island)	Only known from fossils younger than c. 1000 BCE - 500 CE.	
Laysan honeycreeper	Himatione fraithii	Laysan	Disappeared after almost the entire vegetation cover of the island was eaten by introduced feral rabbits. The last three individuals were killed in a storm in 1923.	
Kauaʻi palila	Loxioides kikuchi	Kauai	Known from two fossil jaws dated to 1375-1610 CE.	
Maui ʻākepa	Loxops ochraceus	Maui	Last recorded in 1988, with some dubious audio taken afterward. It could have declined due to habitat loss, invasive diseases, and conflict and competition with introduced species.	
Oʻahu ʻākepa	Loxops wolstenholmei	Oahu mountains	Last recorded in 1900. Probably driven to extinction by habitat destruction, introduced predators and avian diseases.	
Poʻouli	Melamprosops phaeosoma	Maui	Last two individuals recorded in 2004; one died shortly after being captured. The precise causes of decline are unknown. Suggestions include habitat destruction and modification, spread of disease-carrying mosquitos, pig activity, predation by rats, cats, and small Indian mongooses; and the decline of native Hawaiian snails as a result of predation by rats and the garlic snail Oxychilus alliaricus.	
Highland finch	Orthiospiza howarthi	Maui	Prehistoric	
Kākāwahie	Paroreomyza flammea	Molokai	Last recorded in 1961-1963. Presumed to have disappeared due to habitat destruction and disease.	
Lānaʻi ʻalauahio	Paroreomyza montana montana	Lanai	Extinct since 1937.	
ʻŌʻū	Psittirostra psittacea	Hawaii (island), Maui, Molokai, Lanai, Oahu, and Kauai	Last recorded with certainty in the island of Hawaii in 1987, and in Kauai in 1989, though there were some unconfirmed sightings after 1995. It disappeared from Oahu, Maui, Molokai, and Lanai between 1899 and 1931. It may have been driven extinct by habitat loss, introduced rats, and malaria spread by exotic mosquitos.	
Lesser koa finch	Rhodacanthis flaviceps	Hawaii (island)	Seemed to have been driven to extinction by habitat destruction, and not by climatic variation nor mosquito-vectored diseases. Koa finches were likely driven out of lowland habitat before or shortly after the time of western contact in 1778. The two species from the island of Hawaii persisted until the late 19th century, when their upland refugium was degraded by logging, ranching, and intensified predation by the black rat. The lesser koa finch was last recorded in 1891. According to the IUCN red list, "this or a similar species is also known from the fossil record of O'ahu and Maui" apparently referring to the primitive koa finch (Rhodacanthis litotes).	
Scissor-billed koa finch	Rhodacanthis forfex	Maui and Kauai	Known from fossils on Maui and Kauai. Based on its disjunct distribution, the species might have occurred on all main islands except the island of Hawaii, although more fossils are needed for confirmation. The koa finches seem to have been driven to extinction by habitat destruction, and not by climatic variation nor mosquito-vectored diseases. Koa finches were likely driven out of lowland habitat before or shortly after the time of western contact in 1778. The two species from Maui might have survived in an upland refugium until the late 19th century, paralleling the fate of the two species from the island of Hawaii. However, the only verified records are from fossils at a lower elevation.	
Primitive koa finch	Rhodacanthis litotes	Maui and Oahu	Known from fossils on Maui and Oahu. Based on its disjunct distribution, the species might have occurred on all main islands except the island of Hawaii and perhaps Kauai, although more fossils are needed for confirmation. The primitive koa finch populations from Oahu and Maui might represent two distinct species, but more fossils or genetic data are necessary. The koa finches seem to have been driven to extinction by habitat destruction, and not by climatic variation nor mosquito-vectored diseases. Koa finches were likely driven out of lowland habitat before or shortly after the time of western contact in 1778. The two species from Maui might have survived in an upland refugium until the late 19th century, paralleling the fate of the two species from the island of Hawaii. However, the only verified records are from fossils at a lower elevation.	
Greater koa finch	Rhodacanthis palmeri	Hawaii (island)	Last collected in 1896. The causes of extinction are unknown, but habitat destruction and introduced avian malaria are likely responsible.	
Kauaʻi finch	Telespiza persecutrix	Oahu and Kauai	Most recent remains were found in cave deposits dated to 1425-1660.	
Maui Nui finch	Telespiza ypsilon	Maui and Molokai	Prehistoric	
Maui finch	Telespiza cf. ypsilon	Maui	Prehistoric	
Strange-billed finch	Vangulifer mirandus	Maui	Prehistoric	
Thin-billed finch	Vangulifer neophasis	Maui	Prehistoric	
Greater ʻamakihi	Viridonia sagittirostris	Wailuku River, Hawaii (island)	Last recorded in 1901. Its only known forest habitat was cleared to plant sugar cane.	
Cone-billed finch	Xestospiza conica	Kauai	Prehistoric	
Ridge-billed finch	Xestospiza fastigialis	Oahu, Molokai, and Maui	Prehistoric	
	Drepanidini gen. et sp. indet.	Maui	At least three different species, all prehistoric.	
	Drepanidini gen. et sp. indet.	Oahu	Prehistoric	

===== Possibly extinct =====
Common name	Scientific name	Range	Comments	Pictures
Oʻahu ʻalauahio	Paroreomyza maculata	Oahu	Last collected in 1968 and last well-documented observation, of two birds, in 1985. It may have been driven extinct by disease spread by introduced mosquitos.	

==== Incertae familiae ====
Common name	Scientific name	Range	Comments
Slender-billed Kauaʻi passerine	Passeriformes gen. et sp. indet.	Kauai	Prehistoric
Tiny Kauaʻi passerine	Passeriformes gen. et sp. indet.	Kauai	Prehistoric

== Insects (class Insecta) ==
=== Dragonflies and damselflies (order Odonata) ===
==== Narrow-winged damselflies (family Coenagrionidae) ====
===== Possibly extinct =====
Common name	Scientific name	Range	Comments
Maui upland damselfly	Megalagrion jugorum	Maui and Lanai	Last seen in 1917.

=== Grasshoppers, locusts, and crickets (order Orthoptera) ===
==== True crickets (family Gryllidae) ====
Common name	Scientific name	Range	Comments
Oʻahu deceptor bush cricket	Leptogryllus deceptor	Oahu	Last recorded in 1910 or before.

=== True bugs (order Hemiptera) ===
==== Mealybugs (family Pseudococcidae) ====
Scientific name	Range
Clavicoccus erinaceus	Oahu
Phyllococcus oahuensis	Unspecified range within the Hawaiian Islands

=== Beetles (order Coleoptera) ===
==== True weevils (family Curculionidae) ====
Common name	Scientific name	Range	Comments
	Dryophthorus distinguendus	Nearly all of the Hawaiian Islands	Last seen in 1961.
Laysan weevil	Oodemas laysanensis	Laysan	Last seen in 1964.
	Rhyncogonus bryani	Laysan	Last seen in 1911.

=== Butterflies and moths (order Lepidoptera) ===
==== Pyralid moths (family Pyralidae) ====
Scientific name	Range	Comments
Genophantis leahi	Maui, Oahu, Molokai and Hawaii (island)	Last seen in the early 1900s.

==== Owlet moths (family Noctuidae) ====
Common name	Scientific name	Range	Comments
Confused moth	Helicoverpa confusa	Unspecified range within the Hawaiian Islands	Extinct after 1927.
Minute noctuid moth	Helicoverpa minuta	Unspecified range within the Hawaiian Islands	Last seen before 1911.
Laysan dropseed noctuid moth	Hypena laysanensis	Laysan	Last seen in 1911.
Hilo noctuid moth	Hypena newelli	Hawaii (island)	Date of last observation unknown, possibly before 1923. (Note: This source from 2003 says, that "the last observed date [is] given as unknown, but according to Frank Howarth was more than 80 years ago." Thus, the date of last observation is unknown, but possibly before 1923.)
Lovegrass noctuid moth	Hypena plagiota	Kauai, Oahu, and Maui	Last seen before 1960, date unknown.
Kaholuamano noctuid moth	Hypena senicula	Kauai	Date of last collection unknown, possibly before 1923. (Note: This source from 2003 says, that "the last observed date [is] given as unknown but according to Frank Howarth the last collection was more than 80 years ago." Thus, the date of last collection is unknown, but possibly before 1923.)

===== Possibly extinct =====
Common name	Scientific name	Range	Comments	Pictures
Midway noctuid moth	Agrotis fasciata	Midway Atoll	Last seen before 1960, date unknown.	
Kona agrotis noctuid moth	Agrotis panoplias	Hawaii (island)		
Poko noctuid moth	Agrotis crinigera	Kauai, Oahu, Molokai, Lanai, Maui, Hawaii (island), and Laysan	Last seen in 1926.	
Kerr's noctuid moth	Agrotis kerri	French Frigate Shoals	Last seen in 1923.	
Procellaris agrotis noctuid moth	Agrotis procellaris	Laysan	Last seen in 1912.	
Maui agrotis noctuid moth	Agrotis cremata	Oahu and Maui	Last seen in 1912.	
Laysan noctuid moth	Agrotis laysanensis	Laysan	Last seen in 1911.	
Microreas agrotis noctuid moth	Agrotis microreas	Hawaii (island)	Last seen in 1925.	
Light-loving noctuid moth	Agrotis photophila	Oahu	Last seen in 1900.	

===== Data deficient, owlet moths (family Noctuidae) =====
Common name	Scientific name	Range	Comments
Kauai agrotis noctuid moth	Agrotis tephrias	Kauai, Maui, and possibly Hawaii (island)	Last seen in 1985.

==== Geometer moths (family Geometridae) ====
Common name	Scientific name	Range	Comments	Pictures
Kona giant looper moth	Scotorythra megalophylla	Unspecified range within the Hawaiian Islands	Last seen in the early 1900s.	
Koʻolau giant looper moth	Scotorythra nesiotes	Unspecified range within the Hawaiian Islands	Last seen in the early 1900s.	
ʻOlaʻa peppered looper moth	Tritocleis microphylla	Unspecified range within the Hawaiian Islands	Last seen in the 1890s.	

=== True flies (order Diptera) ===
==== Long-legged flies (family Dolichopodidae) ====
Common name	Scientific name	Range	Comments	Pictures
Koʻolau spurwing long-legged fly	Campsicnemus mirabilis	Mount Tantalus, Oahu	Last recorded in 1900. Extinct due to predation by the introduced ant Pheidole megacephala.	

==== Fruit flies and relatives (family Drosophilidae) ====
Common name	Scientific name	Range	Comments
Lanai pomace fly	Drosophila lanaiensis	Lanai and possibly Oahu	Last seen in 1893.

== Snails and slugs (class Gastropoda) ==
=== Order Stylommatophora ===
==== Family Achatinellidae ====
Scientific name	Range	Comments	Pictures
Achatinella abbreviata	Oahu	Last seen in 1963	
Achatinella apexfulva	Oahu	Last individual died in captivity in 2019.	
Achatinella buddii	Oahu	Last seen in the early 1900s.	
Achatinella caesia	Oahu	Last seen in the early 1900s.	
Achatinella casta	Oahu		
Achatinella decora	Oahu	Last seen in the early 1900s.	
Achatinella dimorpha	Oahu	Recorded in 1951 and 1967.	
Achatinella elegans	Oahu	Last seen in 1952.	
Achatinella juddii	Oahu	Last seen in 1958.	
Achatinella juncea	Oahu	One post-1945 record, no recent records.	
Achatinella lehuiensis	Oahu	Last seen in 1922.	
Achatinella papyracea	Oahu	Last seen in 1945.	
Achatinella spaldingi	Oahu	Last seen in 1938.	
Achatinella thaanumi	Oahu	Last seen in the early 1900s.	
Achatinella valida	Oahu	Last seen in 1951.	
Auriculella expansa	Maui	Last observed in 1960.	
Auriculella uniplicata	Maui	Last observed in 1946.	
Newcombia philippiana	Unspecified range within the Hawaiian Islands.	Last collected in 1964.	
Partulina crassa	Lanai	Last seen in 1914.	
Partulina montagui	Unspecified range within the Hawaiian Islands.	Last seen in 1913.	
Perdicella fulgurans	Maui	No post-1945 sightings.	
Perdicella maniensis	Maui	No post-1945 sightings.	
Perdicella zebra	Maui	No post-1945 sightings.	
Perdicella zebrina	Maui	No post-1945 sightings.	

==== Family Amastridae ====
Scientific name	Range	Comments	Pictures
Amastra albolabris	Oahu		
Amastra cornea	Oahu		
Amastra crassilabrum	Oahu	Last observed in 1951.	
Amastra elongata	Oahu		
Amastra forbesi	Unspecified range within the Hawaiian Islands.		
Amastra pellucida	Oahu		
Amastra porcus	Unspecified range within the Hawaiian Islands.		
Amastra reticulata	Oahu		
Amastra subrostrata	Oahu		
Amastra subsoror	Maui	Last observed in 1946.	
Amastra tenuispira			
Amastra umbilicata	Unspecified range within the Hawaiian Islands.		
Carelia anceophila	Kauai	Last seen in 1930.	
Carelia bicolor	Kauai	Last seen in 1970.	
Carelia cochlea	Kauai	Last observed in 1952.	
Carelia cumingiana	Unspecified range within the Hawaiian Islands.	Last seen in 1930.	
Carelia dolei	Kauai	Last observed in 1952.	
Carelia evelynae	Kauai	Last observed in 1952.	
Carelia glossema	Kauai	Last seen in 1930.	
Carelia hyattiana	Kauai		
Carelia kalalauensis	Kauai	Last seen in 1951.	
Carelia knudseni	Kauai	Last seen in 1930.	
Carelia lirata	Kauai	No post-1945 historic sightings.	
Carelia lymani	Kauai		
Carelia mirabilis	Kauai	No post-1945 historic sightings.	
Carelia necra	Kauai	No post-1945 historic sightings.	
Carelia olivacea	Kauai	Last recorded in 1952.	
Carelia paradoxa	Kauai	Last recorded in 1930.	
Carelia periscelis	Kauai	Last recorded in 1930.	
Carelia pilsbryi	Kauai	No post-1945 historic sightings.	
Carelia sinclairi	Unspecified range within the Hawaiian Islands.		
Carelia tenebrosa	Kauai	Last seen in 1930.	
Carelia turricula	Kauai	Last seen in 1930.	

==== Family Pupillidae ====
Scientific name	Range	Comments
Lyropupa perlonga	Oahu	Last observed in 1980.

== Plants (kingdom Plantae) ==
=== Order Apiales ===
==== Celeries, carrots and parsleys (family Apiaceae) ====
Scientific name	Range	Comments
Sanicula kauaiensis	Kauai	Last collected in 1950. Extinct due to introduced plants and animals.

=== Order Arecales ===
==== Palm trees (family Arecaceae) ====
Common name	Scientific name	Range	Comments	Pictures
Laysan fan palm	Pritchardia sp. "Laysan"	Laysan	Last recorded in 1891. The extinction, which predated the introduction of rabbits in 1903 and the subsequent denudation of the island, was blamed on the cutting of palms to produce charcoal. The palm went extinct before it was scientifically studied and assigned to a species. It could have been a unique species, or a population of Pritchardia remota, which survives in Nihoa. P. remota was introduced to Laysan in later times with the aim of replacing the disappeared palm.	

=== Order Asterales ===
==== Sunflowers (family Asteraceae) ====
Scientific name	Range	Comments
Argyroxiphium virescens	Haleakalā crater, Maui	The last pure individual was collected in 1946, and the last hybrid died in 1996. Extinct due to predation by introduced goats, pigs, and cattle.
Tetramolopium consanguineum ssp. consanguineum	Kauai	Last recorded in the wild in 1868, and in captivity in 1978.

===== Possibly extinct =====
Common name	Scientific name	Range	Comments
	Artemisia kauaiensis	Kauai	Last recorded in 2006. Declined due to predation by introduced mule deer and feral pigs, and competition with invasive plants including Lantana camara, Juncus planifolius, Axonopus fissifolius, Rubus rosifolius, and Andropogon virginicus.
Na'ena'e	Dubautia kenwoodii	Kauai	Only known from the holotype collected in 1991. No individuals were found after its known range was impacted by Hurricane Iniki in 1992.
	Tetramolopium consaguineum subsp. leptecophylla	Pohakuloa, Hawaii (island)	

==== Bellflowers (family Campanulaceae) ====
Common name	Scientific name	Range	Comments	Pictures
	Clermontia multiflora	West Maui and the Koolau Mountains of Oahu	Last collected in 1871.	
	Cyanea arborea	Northwestern Haleakala, Maui	Last collected in 1928.	
	Cyanea comata	Southern slope of Haleakala, Maui	Last collected in 1874. Likely extinct due to deforestation.	
	Cyanea copelandii ssp. copelandii	Southeastern Mauna Loa, Hawaii (island)	Last collected in 1957. Extinct due to predation by introduced rats and ungulates. It was also pollinated by now extinct Hawaiian honeycreepers.	
Superb cyanea	Cyanea superba ssp. regina	Koolau Mountains, Oahu	Last recorded in 1960, likely due to competition with introduced plants and predation by feral pigs.	
	Cyanea cylindrocalix	Hawaii (island)	Only known from the holotype collected in 1909.	
Haha	Cyanea dolichopoda	Kauai	Last recorded in 1992. The last individuals were likely killed by a landslide.	
	Cyanea eleeleensis	Kauai	Last recorded in 1977.	
	Cyanea giffardii	Glenwood, Puna, Hawaii	Only known from the type collected in 1917.	
	Cyanea linearifolia	Wahiawa Mountains, Kauai	Only known from the type collected in 1957. Probably extinct due to invasive species.	
	Cyanea mauiensis	Maui	Last collected in 1870. Probably extinct due to habitat degradation by invasive plants and animals.	
	Cyanea minutiflora	Near Ka Loko Reservoir, Kauai	Likely extinct due to habitat degradation by introduced plants and feral ungulates.	
	Cyanea parvifolia	Waioli Valley, Kauai	Likely extinct due to introduced species.	
	Cyanea pohaku	Puunianiau, north-west slope of Haleakala, east Maui		
	Cyanea pycnocarpa	Kohala Mountains, Hawaii (island)	Only known from the type material.	
Oakleaf cyanea	Cyanea quercifolia	Haleakala volcano, Maui		
	Cyanea sessilifolia	Northern Ko'olau Mountains, Oahu	Last recorded in 1946. Likely extinct due to competition with introduced plants, predation by introduced pigs, rats, slugs, and snails, and climate change.	
	Delissea niihauensis	Niihau	Last recorded in 1870.	
	Delissea sinuata	Waianae Mountains, Oahu	Last recorded in 1937.	
	Delissea subcordata	Koʻolau Mountains, Oahu	Last recorded in 1934. Likely extinct due to invasive weeds, ungulates, rats, and slugs.	
Undulata delissea	Delissea undulata subsp. kauaiensis	West of the Hanapepe River, Kauai	Only known from the holotype collected in 1895.	
Undulata delissea	Delissea undulata subsp. undulata	Maui	First described in the 19th century, it was assumed extinct before lone individuals were rediscovered in 1971 and 1992. The IUCN listed it as extinct in 2016. Likely extinct due to invasive plants, animals, and habitat loss because of clearance for agriculture and increasing frequency of fires.	

===== Possibly extinct =====
Common name	Scientific name	Range	Comments
Haha	Cyanea kolekoleensis	Wahiawa Drainage, Kauai	The species was described from fifteen individuals discovered in 1987. In 1992 this area was impacted by Hurricane Iniki, and a lone individual was last recorded in 1998. The species was also threatened by predation from introduced pigs, rats, and slugs, and competition with the introduced plants Clidemia hirta, Psidium cattleianum, and Cyathea cooperi.
	Delissea takeuchii	Waianae Mountains, Oahu	Last recorded in 1987. Declined due to competition with the introduced plants Psidium cattleianum and Clidemia hirta, and predation by introduced pigs.

===== Extinct in the wild =====
Common name	Scientific name	Range	Comments	Pictures
Sharktail cyanea	Cyanea pinnatifida	Oahu	Last wild plant died in 2001. Survives in captivity at the Lyon Arboretum and the National Tropical Botanical Garden.	
Superb cyanea	Cyanea superba ssp. superba	Northern Waianae Mountains and southern Koolau Mountains, Oahu	Last recorded in the wild around 2000. Declined due to competition with invasive plants, predation by introduced pigs, rats and slugs, and wildfires generated by activities in a nearby military firing range.	

===== Possibly extinct in the wild =====
Common name	Scientific name	Range	Comments	Pictures
Kauai delissea	Delissea rhytidosperma	Kauai	Last recorded in Hanakapiai in 2002. Declined due to competition with introduced Melaleuca quinquenervia, Cyathea cooperi, Melinis minutiflora, Andropogon glomeratus, Lantana camara, and Clidemia hirta; predation by introduced pigs, goats, mule deer, slugs, and rodents; diseases transmitted by leafhoppers and spider mites, and diminished pollination and seed dispersal due to the extinction of native birds and insects.	

=== Order Caryophyllales ===
==== Amaranths (family Amaranthaceae) ====
Common name	Scientific name	Range	Comments
Hawaiʻi chaff flower	Achyranthes atollensis	Kure Atoll, Midway Atoll, Pearl and Hermes Atoll, and Laysan Island	Last recorded in 1964. Declined due to habitat destruction for military development, predation by introduced animals, and competition with introduced plants.
	Amaranthus brownii	Nīhoa	Last recorded in 1983. Declined due to competition by introduced plant species, landslides, fires, and predation and habitat degradation by introduced animals.

==== Carnations (family Caryophyllaceae) ====
Scientific name	Range	Comments
Schiedea amplexicaulis	Kauai and possibly Niihau	Last recorded in 1855. Likely extinct due to introduced plants and animals.

===== Possibly extinct in the wild =====
Scientific name	Range	Comments	Pictures
Schiedea attenuata	Kauai	Last recorded in the Kalalau Valley in 1994. Declined due to competition with introduced plants like Erigeron, Rubus argutus, Verbena, Lantana camara, Setaria, Kalanchoe, and Lythrum, as well as predation by introduced goats.	
Silene perlmanii	Waiʻanae Mountains, Oahu	Last recorded in the wild in 1997. Declined due to competition with the introduced plants Erigeron karvinskianum, Melinis minutiflora, Morella faya, Passiflora suberosa, and Schinus terebinthifolia, along with predation and habitat degradation caused by introduced pigs and goats.	

==== Sedges (family Cyperaceae) ====
Scientific name	Range	Comments
Cyperus rockii	Waialae stream, western Kauai	Only known from the holotype collected in 1916. Likely extinct due to invasive plants and animals.

=== Order Fabales ===
==== Legumes (family Fabaceae) ====
===== Possibly extinct in the wild =====
Common name	Scientific name	Range	Comments	Pictures
Ka palupalu o Kanaloa	Kanaloa kahoolawensis	Kahoʻolawe lowlands	The last wild individual was recorded before 2014. The species is threatened by drought, spider mites and two-spotted mites, competition with invasive plants, and predation by introduced rats and mice.	

=== Order Gentianales ===
==== Dogbanes (family Apocynaceae) ====
Scientific name	Range	Comments	Pictures
Ochrosia kilaueaensis	Hawaii (island)	Last recorded in 1927. Its habitat was degraded by introduced plants, goats, and fire.	

==== Coffee and relatives (family Rubiaceae) ====
===== Possibly extinct in the wild =====
Scientific name	Range	Comments
Kadua haupuensis	Kauai	The last known seven wild individuals were killed by a landslide in 1998. Captive descendants are kept at the National Tropical Botanical Garden in Kauai. It had declined earlier due to competition with introduced plants including Caesalpinia decapetala, Rhodomyrtus tomentosa, Psidium cattleianum, Passiflora laurifolia, and grasses; as well as predation and habitat degradation by introduced pigs and goats.

=== Order Lamiales ===
==== Gesneriads (family Gesneriaceae) ====
Scientific name	Range	Comments
Cyrtandra olona	Wahiawa Mountains, Kauai	Only known from the holotype collected in 1909. Likely extinct due to habitat degradation and predation by introduced ungulates and plants.

===== Possibly extinct =====
Scientific name	Range	Comments
Cyrtandra crenata	Koolau Mountains, Oahu	Last recorded in 1947. Declined due to habitat degradation by introduced pigs and goats, predation by introduced rats, slugs, and snails; and competition with introduced plants.

===== Extinct in the wild =====
Common name	Scientific name	Range	Comments
Fuzzyflower cyrtandra	Cyrtandra waiolani	Koolau Mountains, Oahu	Last recorded in 1943. Declined due to predation by feral pigs and other invasive animals.

==== Mints (family Lamiaceae) ====
===== Possibly extinct =====
Common name	Scientific name	Range	Comments
Hillebrand's phyllostegia	Phyllostegia hillebrandii	Western and southern flanks of Haleakala, Maui	Last collected in 1870. Most of its original range is now deforested, but it could still survive in the remaining forest. If alive, it could be threatened by introduced pigs, cattle, deer, goats, and plants.
	Phyllostegia kahiliensis	Mount Kahili, Kauai	Last recorded in 1987.
	Phyllostegia knudsenii	Waimea, Kauai	Last collected in 2001. Declined due to predation by introduced animals (rats, slugs, goats, pigs) and competition with introduced plants (Rubus argutus, Kalanchoe pinnata, Psidium cattleianum, Grevillea robusta, Myrica faya, Mariscus meyenianus, Passiflora mollissima, Lantana camara, Setaria parviflora and Erigeron karvinskianum).

===== Possibly extinct in the wild =====
Common name	Scientific name	Range	Comments	Pictures
Twocleft stenogyne	Stenogyne bifida	Molokai	Last known individual in the wild died in 2015. Delcined due to competition with introduced plants including Melinis minutiflora, Buddleia asiatica, Rubus rosifolius, and Schinus terebinthifolia; predation by introduced slugs, feral pigs (which also degrade its habitat), and root mealybugs, and infection with powdery mildew.	
Kalalau Valley stenogyne	Stenogyne campanulata	Kauai	Last recorded in the wild in 2006. Declined due to predation, habitat degradation, and erosion caused by introduced goats and pigs, as well as competition with introduced plants including Erigeron karvinskianum, Rubus argutus, and Kalanchoe pinnata.	
Oahu stenogyne	Stenogyne kanehoana	Western Oahu	Last recorded in the wild in 2013. Declined due to competition with introduced plants including Clidemia hirta, Schinus terebinthifolia, and Psidium cattleianum; predation and habitat degradation caused by introduced rats, slugs, pigs, goats, and cattle; fire, and infection by an unidentified species of powdery mildew.	

=== Order Malvales ===
==== Mallows (family Malvaceae) ====
Common name	Scientific name	Range	Comments	Pictures
Kawaihae hibiscadelphus	Hibiscadelphus bombycinus	Kawaihae, Hawaii (island)	Only known from the holotype collected before 1868.	
Lava hau kuahiwi	Hibiscadelphus crucibracteatus	Puhielelu Ridge, Lanai	Only known from a tree discovered in 1981, which has died since. Seeds were collected but have not been germinated.	
Maui hau kuahiwi	Hibiscadelphus wilderianus	Maui	Only known from the holotype discovered in 1910, which has since died.	
Wailupe Valley treecotton	Kokia lanceolata	Makaku, Koko Head, and Wailupe Valley, Oahu	Discovered in 1888, it became extinct shortly afterwards.	

===== Extinct in the wild =====
Common name	Scientific name	Range	Comments	Pictures
Kilauea hau kuahiwi	Hibiscadelphus giffardianus	Mauna Loa, Hawaii (island)	Last wild individual died in 1930, possibly due to predation by introduced rats, and introduced diseases. Rewilding captie individuals is hampered by the extinction of its probable natural pollinator, a Hawaiian honey-creeper.	
Molokaʻi treecotton	Kokia cookei	Mahana, western Molokai	Likely exterminated from the wild by grazing sheep.	

==== Daphnes (family Thymelaeaceae) ====
Common name	Scientific name	Range	Comments
Lavafield false ohelo	Wikstroemia hanalei	Kauai	Last collected in 1897.

===== Possibly extinct =====
Common name	Scientific name	Range	Comments
Skottsberg's false ohelo	Wikstroemia skottsbergiana	Kauai	Last recorded in 2000, after having been considered extinct for many years before. The species is threatened by habitat degradation, introduced predators including pigs, goats, and rats, and also by competition with introduced plants like Cyathea cooperi, Melastoma candidum, Clidemia hirta, Axonopus fissifolius, Cyperus meyenianus, Juncus planifolius, Oplismenus hirtellus, Rubus rosifolius, Sacciolepis indica, Schizachyrium condensatum, Setaria gracilis, and Psidium guajava.

=== Order Poales ===
==== True grasses (family Poaceae) ====
Scientific name	Range	Comments
Cenchrus agrimonioides var. laysanensis	Kure, Midway and Laysan	Last recorded in 1973. Eradicated from Laysan by introduced rabbits, and from Kure and Midway by the construction of military installations.

=== Order Rosales ===
==== Roses (family Rosaceae) ====
Common name	Scientific name	Range	Comments	Pictures
Liliwai	Acaena exigua	Maui and Kauai	Last individual died in 2000.	

=== Order Sapindales ===
==== Rues and citrus trees (family Rutaceae) ====
Common name	Scientific name	Range	Comments
Kaholuamanu melicope	Melicope macropus	Waimea, Kauai	Last collected in the Nuʻololo stream in 1995. Extinct due to predation and habitat destruction by introduced feral goats, pigs, and deer, and competition with introduced plants like Rubus rosifolius, R. argutus, Hedychium garderianum, and Kalanchoe pinnata.
Makawao melicope	Melicope obovata	Maui?	Only known from the holotype, of uncertain procedence.

== See also ==
- Endemism in the Hawaiian Islands
- List of endemic birds of Hawaii
- List of Oceanian species extinct in the Holocene
- List of Australia-New Guinea species extinct in the Holocene
- List of New Zealand species extinct in the Holocene
- List of North American animals extinct in the Holocene
- List of extinct bird species since 1500
- Holocene extinction
