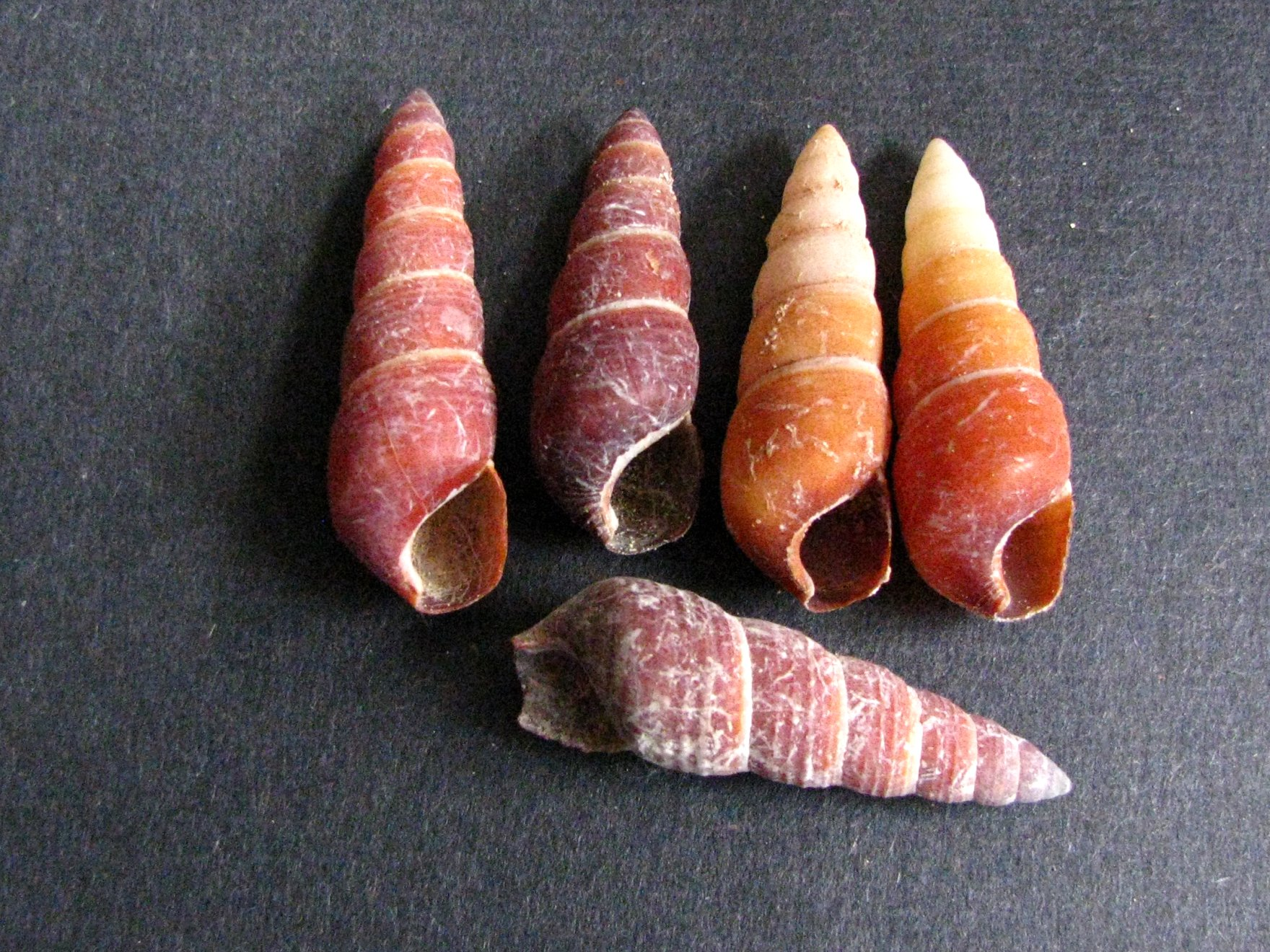
- Shells of Carelia cochlea

Scientific classification
- Domain: Eukaryota
- Kingdom: Animalia
- Phylum: Mollusca
- Class: Gastropoda
- Order: Stylommatophora
- Family: Amastridae
- Genus: Carelia; Adams, 1855

= Carelia (gastropod) =

Genus of gastropods

Carelia was a genus of small, air-breathing, land snails, terrestrial pulmonate gastropod mollusks in the family Amastridae and superfamily Pupilloidea. Snails in this genus were endemic to the Hawaiian Islands.

== Species ==
Species within the genus Carelia include:

- Carelia anceophila
- Carelia bicolor
- Carelia cochlea
- Carelia cumingiana
- Carelia dolei
- Carelia evelynae
- Carelia glossema
- Carelia hyattiana
- Carelia kalalauensis
- Carelia knudseni
- Carelia lirata
- Carelia lymani
- Carelia mirabilis
- Carelia necra
- Carelia olivacea
- Carelia paradoxa
- Carelia periscelis
- Carelia pilsbryi
- Carelia sinclairi
- Carelia tenebrosa
- Carelia turricula
