= Gastrocopta chichijimana =

Conservation status
- Extinct (IUCN 2.3)

Scientific classification
- Kingdom: Animalia
- Phylum: Mollusca
- Class: Gastropoda
- Order: Stylommatophora
- Family: Gastrocoptidae
- Genus: Gastrocopta
- Species: †G. chichijimana

Binomial name
- †Gastrocopta chichijimana Pilsbry, 1916

Species of gastropod

Gastrocopta chichijimana was a species of very small air-breathing land snail, a terrestrial pulmonate gastropod mollusc in the family Gastrocoptidae, the whorl snails.

This snail was endemic to Japan; it is now extinct.
