= Islamia ateni =

Conservation status
- Extinct (2015) (IUCN 3.1)

Scientific classification
- Kingdom: Animalia
- Phylum: Mollusca
- Class: Gastropoda
- Subclass: Caenogastropoda
- Order: Littorinimorpha
- Family: Hydrobiidae
- Genus: Islamia
- Species: †I. ateni

Binomial name
- †Islamia ateni (Boeters, 1969)

Species of gastropod

Islamia ateni is an extinct species of gastropod that was endemic to Spain. Its primary cause of extinction was habitat destruction.
