= Rough-lined elimia =

Conservation status
- Extinct (IUCN 3.1)

- Presumed Extinct (NatureServe)

Scientific classification
- Kingdom: Animalia
- Phylum: Mollusca
- Class: Gastropoda
- Subclass: Caenogastropoda
- Order: incertae sedis
- Family: Pleuroceridae
- Genus: Elimia
- Species: †E. pilsbryi

Binomial name
- †Elimia pilsbryi (Goodrich, 1927)

Synonyms
- Goniobasis pilsbryi

Species of gastropod

The rough-lined elimia, scientific name Elimia pilsbryi, was a species of freshwater snail in the family Pleuroceridae. This species was endemic to the Coosa River system of Alabama in the United States; it is now presumed extinct, due to the impoundment of the river.
