= Kubaryia =

Conservation status
- Critically endangered, possibly extinct (IUCN 3.1)

Scientific classification
- Kingdom: Animalia
- Phylum: Mollusca
- Class: Gastropoda
- Subclass: Caenogastropoda
- Order: Littorinimorpha
- Family: Assimineidae
- Genus: Kubaryia; Clench, 1948
- Species: K. pilikia

Binomial name
- Kubaryia pilikia Clench, 148

Genus of gastropods

Kubaryia is a genus of gastropods in the family Assimineidae. It is monotypic, the only species being Kubaryia pilikia. It is endemic to the island of Peleliu in Palau.

This ground-dwelling species is known to have occurred in moist lowland forest. It was last observed in 2003 when one dead shell was discovered. It is not known whether it still exists.
