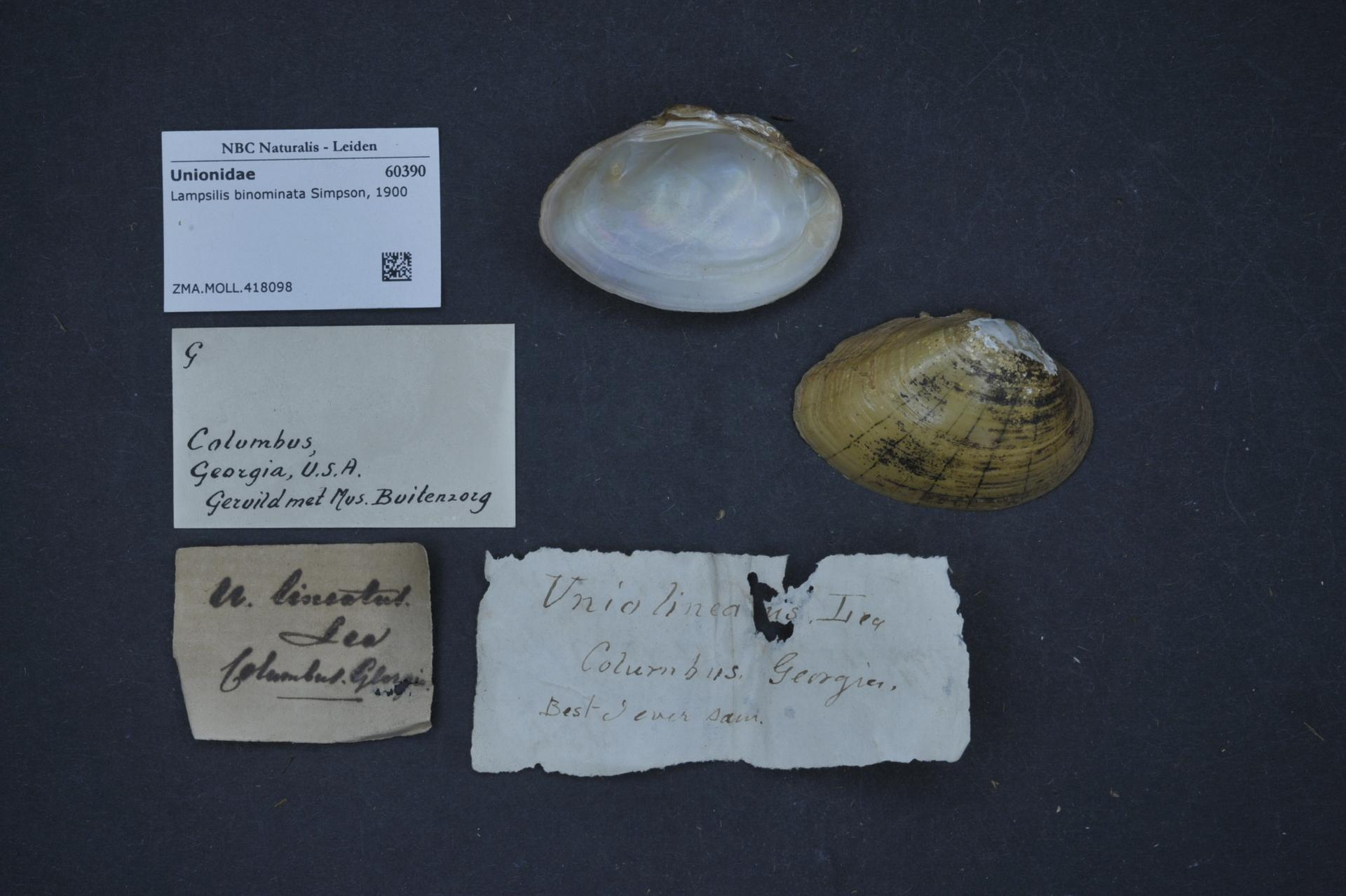

Conservation status
- Extinct (IUCN 2.3)

- Presumed Extinct (NatureServe)

Scientific classification
- Kingdom: Animalia
- Phylum: Mollusca
- Class: Bivalvia
- Order: Unionida
- Family: Unionidae
- Genus: Lampsilis
- Species: †L. binominata

Binomial name
- †Lampsilis binominata Simpson, 1900

= Lined pocketbook =

Species of bivalve

The lined pocketbook (Lampsilis binominata) was a species of freshwater river mussel, an aquatic bivalve in the family Unionidae the river mussels. This species was endemic to the United States. It is now extinct.

A study done by the University of Georgia Museum of Natural Science showed that Lined Pocketbook filtered water through their gills, leading to the digestion of trapped food particles.
