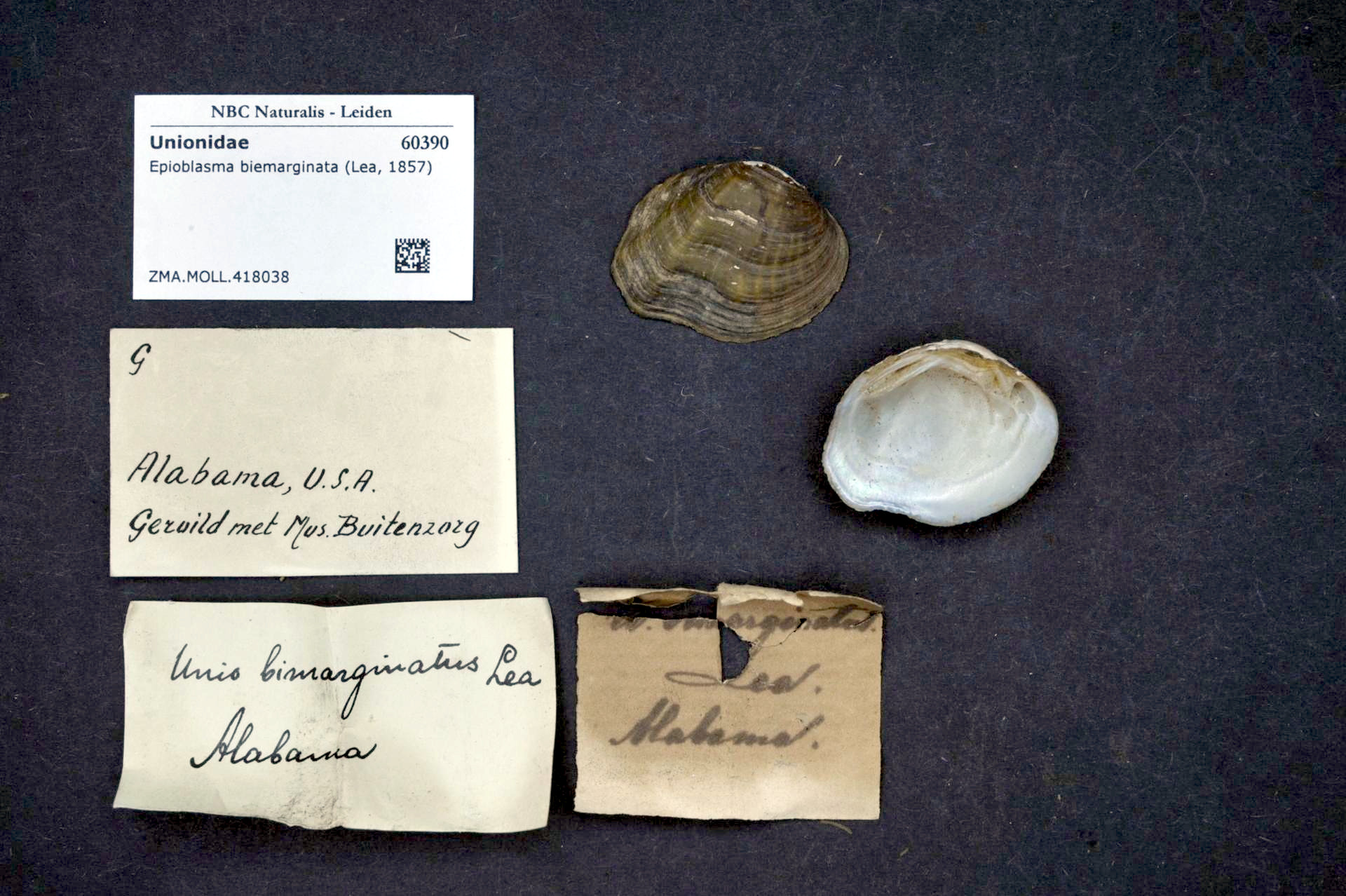

Conservation status
- Extinct (IUCN 2.3)

- Presumed Extinct (NatureServe)

Scientific classification
- Kingdom: Animalia
- Phylum: Mollusca
- Class: Bivalvia
- Order: Unionida
- Family: Unionidae
- Genus: Epioblasma
- Species: †E. biemarginata

Binomial name
- †Epioblasma biemarginata (I. Lea, 1857)

Synonyms
- Dysnomia biemarginata I. Lea, 1857

= Epioblasma biemarginata =

Species of bivalve

Epioblasma biemarginata, the angled riffleshell, was a species of freshwater mussel, an aquatic bivalve mollusk in the family Unionidae, the river mussels. It is now extinct.

This species was endemic to the drainages of the Cumberland River and the Tennessee River in the United States. It was known from several locations in Kentucky, Tennessee, and Alabama. Its natural habitat was shallow, fast moving water of major rivers. It became extinct due to habitat loss, as the rivers were dammed and diverted. The last live individual was seen in 1970, at Muscle Shoals on the Tennessee River.
