= Pleurobema flavidulum =

Conservation status
- Extinct (IUCN 2.3)

Scientific classification
- Kingdom: Animalia
- Phylum: Mollusca
- Class: Bivalvia
- Order: Unionida
- Family: Unionidae
- Genus: Pleurobema
- Species: †P. flavidulum

Binomial name
- †Pleurobema flavidulum (I. Lea, 1861)

Species of bivalve

Pleurobema flavidulum, the yellow pigtoe, was a species of freshwater mussel, an aquatic bivalve mollusk in the family Unionidae. It was endemic to the United States. Its natural habitat was rivers. It is now extinct.
