= Fluvidona dulvertonensis =

Conservation status
- Extinct (IUCN 2.3)

Scientific classification
- Kingdom: Animalia
- Phylum: Mollusca
- Class: Gastropoda
- Subclass: Caenogastropoda
- Order: Littorinimorpha
- Family: Tateidae
- Genus: Fluvidona
- Species: †F. dulvertonensis

Binomial name
- †Fluvidona dulvertonensis (Tenison-Woods, 1876)

Species of gastropod

Fluvidona dulvertonensis was a species of small freshwater snail with an operculum, an aquatic gastropod mollusc or micromollusc in the family Tateidae. This species was endemic to Australia but was declared extinct in 1996.
