= Littoraria flammea =

Conservation status
- Extinct (IUCN 2.3)

Scientific classification
- Kingdom: Animalia
- Phylum: Mollusca
- Class: Gastropoda
- Subclass: Caenogastropoda
- Order: Littorinimorpha
- Family: Littorinidae
- Genus: Littoraria
- Species: †L. flammea

Binomial name
- †Littoraria flammea Philippi, 1847

Species of gastropod

Littoraria flammea (Philippi,1847)

Littoraria flammea was a species of sea snail in the family Littorinidae, the periwinkles or winkles.

This species was endemic to coastal China. It is now extinct.
