= Belgrandiella intermedia =

Conservation status
- Extinct (yes) (IUCN 2.3)

Scientific classification
- Kingdom: Animalia
- Phylum: Mollusca
- Class: Gastropoda
- Subclass: Caenogastropoda
- Order: Littorinimorpha
- Family: Hydrobiidae
- Genus: Belgrandiella
- Species: †B. intermedia

Binomial name
- †Belgrandiella intermedia (Boeters, 1970)

Species of gastropod

Belgrandiella intermedia was a species of very small freshwater snail, an aquatic gastropod mollusc in the family Hydrobiidae.

The International Union for the Conservation of Nature and Natural Resources (IUCN) has listed the species as extinct since 1996.

== Range of distribution ==
This species was previously found in Central Europe, particularly in Austria.
