= Unio cariei =

Conservation status
- Extinct (IUCN 3.1)

Scientific classification
- Kingdom: Animalia
- Phylum: Mollusca
- Class: Bivalvia
- Order: Unionida
- Family: Unionidae
- Genus: Unio
- Species: †U. cariei

Binomial name
- †Unio cariei Germain, 1919

Species of bivalve

Unio cariei was a species of medium-sized freshwater mussel, an aquatic bivalve mollusc in the family Unionidae.

This species was endemic to the island of Réunion in the Indian Ocean, but it is now extinct.
