= Round slitshell =

Conservation status
- Extinct (IUCN 2.3)

- Presumed Extinct (NatureServe)

Scientific classification
- Kingdom: Animalia
- Phylum: Mollusca
- Class: Gastropoda
- Subclass: Caenogastropoda
- Order: incertae sedis
- Family: Pleuroceridae
- Genus: †Gyrotoma
- Species: †G. walkeri

Binomial name
- †Gyrotoma walkeri (H. H. Smith, 1924)

Extinct species of gastropod

The round slitshell, scientific name Gyrotoma walkeri, is an extinct species of freshwater snail, an aquatic gastropod mollusk in the family Pleuroceridae. This species was endemic to the United States.
