= Pleurobema bournianum =

Conservation status
- Extinct (IUCN 2.3)

Scientific classification
- Kingdom: Animalia
- Phylum: Mollusca
- Class: Bivalvia
- Order: Unionida
- Family: Unionidae
- Genus: Pleurobema
- Species: †P. bournianum

Binomial name
- †Pleurobema bournianum (I. Lea, 1840)

Species of bivalve

Pleurobema bournianum, the Scioto pigtoe, was a species of freshwater mussel, an aquatic bivalve mollusk in the family Unionidae, the river mussels.

This species was endemic to the United States. Its natural habitat was rivers.
