= Pleurobema stabile =

Conservation status
- Extinct (IUCN 2.3)

- Critically Imperiled (NatureServe)

Scientific classification
- Kingdom: Animalia
- Phylum: Mollusca
- Class: Bivalvia
- Order: Unionida
- Family: Unionidae
- Genus: Pleurobema
- Species: †P. stabile

Binomial name
- †Pleurobema stabile (I. Lea, 1861)

Synonyms
- Pleurobema murrayense (Lea, 1868); Pleurobema stabilis (Lea, 1861); Unio stabilis Lea, 1861; Unio murrayensis Lea, 1868

Species of bivalve

Pleurobema stabile, the Coosa pigtoe, is a species of freshwater mussel, an aquatic bivalve mollusk in the family Unionidae, the river mussels.

This species is endemic to the United States. Its natural habitat is rivers.
