= Highnut =

Conservation status
- Extinct (IUCN 2.3)

Scientific classification
- Kingdom: Animalia
- Phylum: Mollusca
- Class: Bivalvia
- Order: Unionida
- Family: Unionidae
- Genus: Pleurobema
- Species: †P. altum

Binomial name
- †Pleurobema altum (Conrad, 1854)

Extinct species of bivalve

The highnut (Pleurobema altum) was a species of freshwater mussel, an aquatic bivalve mollusk in the family Unionidae, the river mussels.

This species was endemic to rivers of the United States.

Unionids are vulnerable to habitat change and are a highly endangered taxa (70% of them are considered imperiled).
