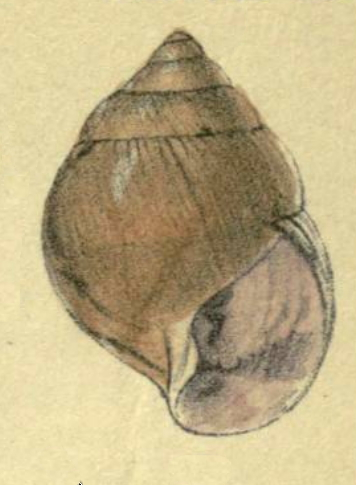
- Shell of Amastra porcus (holotype)

Conservation status
- Extinct (IUCN 2.3)

- Possibly Extinct (NatureServe)

Scientific classification
- Kingdom: Animalia
- Phylum: Mollusca
- Class: Gastropoda
- Order: Stylommatophora
- Family: Amastridae
- Genus: Amastra
- Species: †A. porcus

Binomial name
- †Amastra porcus Hyatt & Pilsbry, 1911

Synonyms
- † Amastra (Amastrella) porcus Hyatt & Pilsbry, 1911 alternative representation

= Amastra porcus =

Species of mollusc

Amastra porcus is an extinct species of air-breathing land snail, a terrestrial pulmonate gastropod mollusk in the family Amastridae.

== Description ==
The length of the shell attains 13 mm, its diameter 9.1 mm.

(Original description) The shell contains 5 1/3 whorls. The shell is imperforate, globose-conic, thin, and uniformly light brown. The embryonic shell consists of approximately 2 1/2 whorls, forming a conic structure. The first whorl is convex, while the subsequent whorls are nearly flat, with a smooth surface that is not glossy but reveals faint, fine striations under strong magnification.

The post-embryonic whorls are more convex and are irregularly sculpted with rough growth wrinkles, which become notably coarse on the back of the globose body whorl.

The aperture is slightly oblique and lined with a very thin layer of white. The outer lip is sharp and delicate. The columellar lamella is small, thin, white, and distinctly oblique, complementing the shell's light and refined structure.

== Distribution ==
This species was endemic to Hawaii and occurred on Oahu island.
