= Carelia mirabilis =

Conservation status
- Extinct (IUCN 2.3)

- Possibly Extinct (NatureServe)

Scientific classification
- Kingdom: Animalia
- Phylum: Mollusca
- Class: Gastropoda
- Order: Stylommatophora
- Family: Amastridae
- Genus: †Carelia
- Species: †C. mirabilis

Binomial name
- †Carelia mirabilis C. M. Cooke, 1931

Species of gastropod

Carelia mirabilis was a species of small, air-breathing, land snail, terrestrial pulmonate gastropod mollusc in the family Amastridae.

This species was endemic to the Hawaiian Islands.
