= Carelia paradoxa =

Conservation status
- Extinct (IUCN 2.3)

- Possibly Extinct (NatureServe)

Scientific classification
- Kingdom: Animalia
- Phylum: Mollusca
- Class: Gastropoda
- Order: Stylommatophora
- Family: Amastridae
- Genus: †Carelia
- Species: †C. paradoxa

Binomial name
- †Carelia paradoxa C. M. Cooke & Y. Kondo, 1952

Species of gastropod

Carelia paradoxa was a species of small, air-breathing, land snail, a terrestrial pulmonate gastropod mollusc in the family Amastridae.

This species was endemic to the Hawaiian Islands. It became extinct in the first half of the 20th century.
