= Amastra forbesi =

Conservation status
- Extinct (IUCN 2.3)

- Presumed Extinct (NatureServe)

Scientific classification
- Kingdom: Animalia
- Phylum: Mollusca
- Class: Gastropoda
- Order: Stylommatophora
- Family: Amastridae
- Genus: Amastra
- Species: †A. forbesi

Binomial name
- †Amastra forbesi C. M. Cooke, 1917

Synonyms
- Amastra (Metamastra) forbesi C. M. Cooke, 1917 · alternative representation

Species of gastropod

Amastra forbesi is an extinct species of gastropod in the Amastridae family.

It was endemic to Hawaii.

== Description ==
The length of the shell attains 14.3 mm, its diameter 6.9 mm.

(Original description) The shell is imperforate, sinistral, elongate-conic, and thin, with a pure white coloration in its fossilized state. The spire's outlines are regularly and slightly convex, tapering to a rather sharp summit.

The whorls of the protoconch are slightly convex and indistinctly marked with minute striations. Subsequent whorls are also slightly convex, adorned with fine striations and delicate growth wrinkles. The body whorl is elongate, subcylindrical, and exhibits relatively coarse striations. It descends steeply near its base, forming a narrow, deeply curved area below the columellar fold.

The outer margin of the aperture is regularly curved and strengthened by a thick, prominent lip rib. The columella is short and broad, with a columellar fold that is moderately oblique and not particularly pronounced, tapering gradually just inside the columellar margin.

== Distribution ==
This species was endemic to Hawai, occurring in Pleistocene strata on Maui Island.
