= Amastra subrostrata =

Conservation status
- Extinct (IUCN 2.3)

- Possibly Extinct (NatureServe)

Scientific classification
- Kingdom: Animalia
- Phylum: Mollusca
- Class: Gastropoda
- Order: Stylommatophora
- Family: Amastridae
- Genus: Amastra
- Species: †A. subrostrata

Binomial name
- †Amastra subrostrata Pfeiffer, 1859
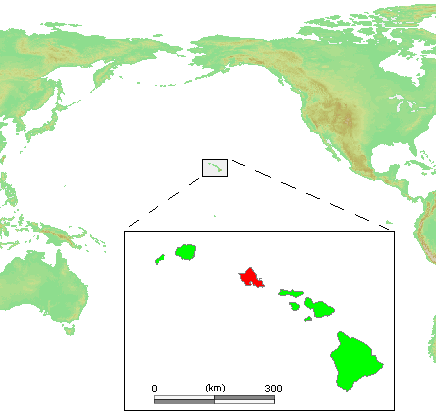
- Location of Oʻahu

Synonyms
- Achatinella (Laminella) subrostrata L. Pfeiffer, 1859 superseded combination; Achatinella subrostrata L. Pfeiffer, 1859 superseded combination; Amastra (Metamastra) subrostrata (L. Pfeiffer, 1859) alternative representation

Species of gastropod

Amastra subrostrata was an extinct species of air-breathing land snail, a terrestrial pulmonate gastropod mollusc in the family Amastridae.

Subspecies

- Amastra subrostrata acuminata C. M. Cooke, 1933
- Amastra subrostrata subrostrata (L. Pfeiffer, 1859)

== Description ==
The length of the shell attains 15 mm, its diameter 8 mm

The shell is imperforate, dextral, ovate-conic, and solid, with an irregularly striate surface that is slightly glossy. Its coloration is brown, irregularly clouded with tawny hues.

The spire is swollen-conic with a rather acute apex and consists of six whorls. The first four whorls are barely convex, while the body whorl is rounded and accounts for about two-fifths of the total length. A nearly basal, acute, and oblique columellar lamella is present.

The aperture is slightly oblique and irregularly semi-elliptical, angular at the columella, giving it a beak-like extension. The peristome is unexpanded and white-lipped within, with the right margin slightly spreading and the columellar margin only slightly dilated and adnate.

== Distribution ==
This species was endemic to Hawai, occurring on Oʻahu.
