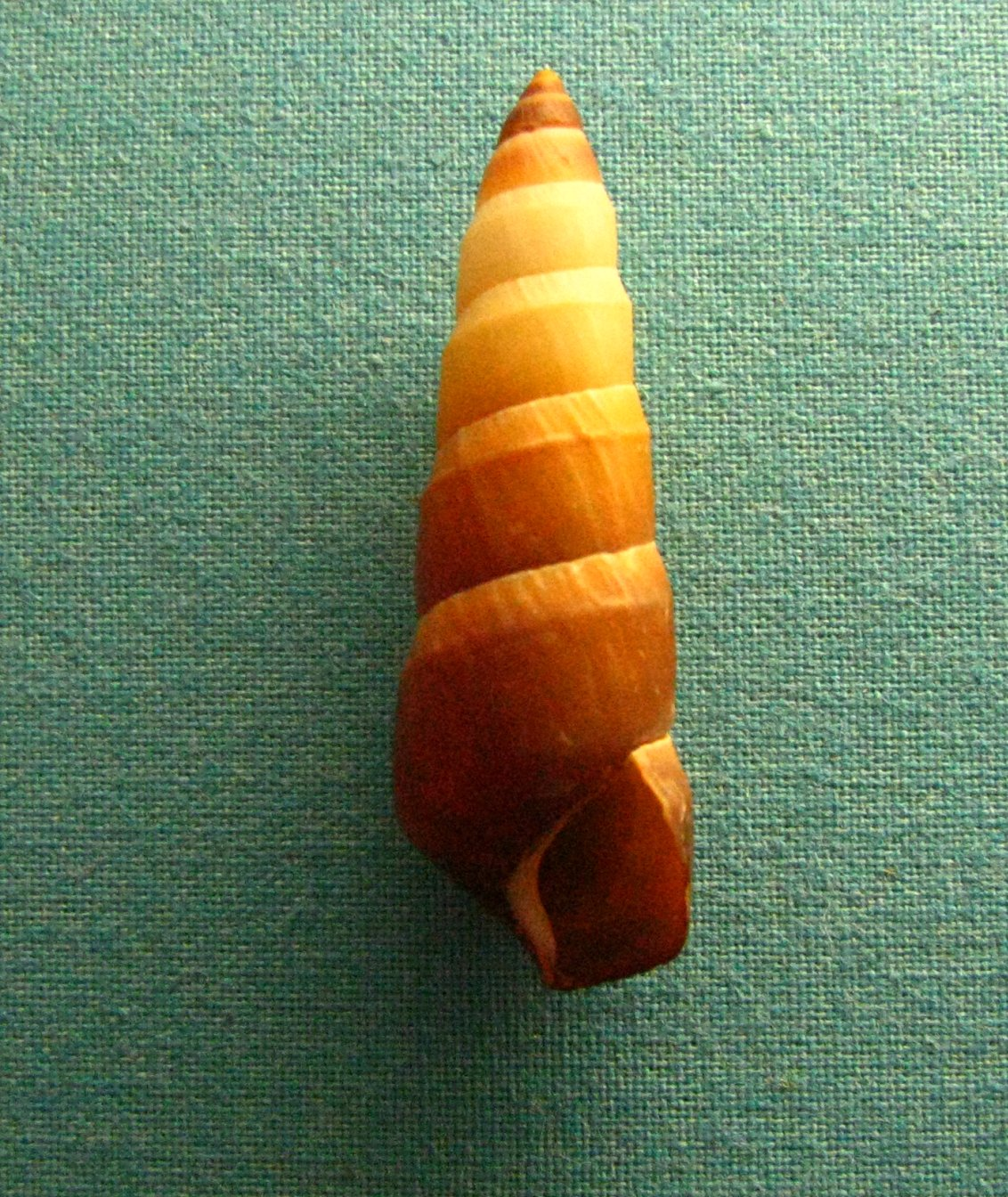
- Carelia dolei shell

Conservation status
- Extinct (IUCN 2.3)

- Possibly Extinct (NatureServe)

Scientific classification
- Kingdom: Animalia
- Phylum: Mollusca
- Class: Gastropoda
- Order: Stylommatophora
- Family: Amastridae
- Genus: †Carelia
- Species: †C. dolei

Binomial name
- †Carelia dolei Ancey, 1893

= Carelia dolei =

Species of gastropod

Carelia dolei was a species of small, air-breathing, land snail, terrestrial pulmonate gastropod mollusks in the family Amastridae.

This species was endemic to the Hawaiian Islands.
