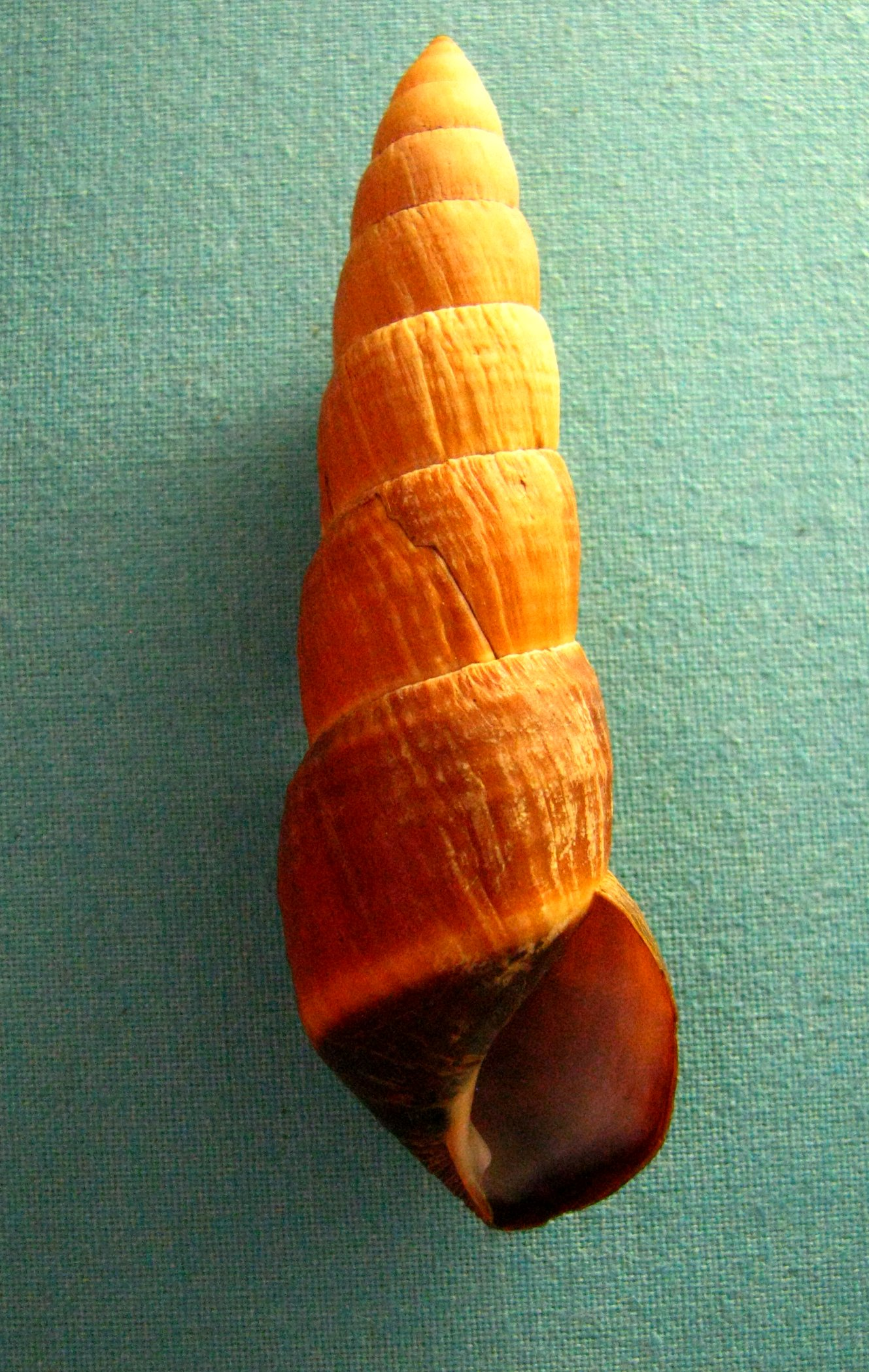
- Carelia turricula shell

Conservation status
- Extinct (IUCN 2.3)

- Possibly Extinct (NatureServe)

Scientific classification
- Kingdom: Animalia
- Phylum: Mollusca
- Class: Gastropoda
- Order: Stylommatophora
- Family: Amastridae
- Genus: †Carelia
- Species: †C. turricula

Binomial name
- †Carelia turricula (Mighels, 1845)

Synonyms
- Achatina turricula Mighels, 1845; Spiraxis (?) turricula Pfeiffer, 1853; Carelia turricula Pease, 1871; Achatina obeliscus Reeve, 1849; Achatina newcombi Pfeiffer, 1851; Carelia cocklea Gulick, 1905

= Carelia turricula =

Extinct species of gastropod

Carelia turricula are an extinct species of small, air-breathing, land snail, terrestrial pulmonate gastropod mollusc in the family Amastridae.

This species was endemic to the Hawaiian Islands.
