= IUCN Red List of extinct species =

On 17 October 2026, the IUCN Red List of Threatened Species identified 996 (840 animals, 156 plants) extinct species, subspecies and varieties, stocks and sub-populations.

== Kingdom Animalia ==
=== Phylum Arthropoda ===
==== Class Arachnida ====
===== Order Holothyrida =====
- Family Holothyridae
  - Gardiner's giant mite (Dicrogonatus gardineri)

===== Order Opiliones =====
- Family Podoctidae
  - Centrobunus braueri

==== Subphylum Crustacea ====
===== Order Amphipoda =====
- Family Crangonyctidae
  - Stygobromus lucifugus

===== Order Calanoida =====
- Family Diaptomidae
  - Tropodiaptomus ctenopus

===== Order Cyclopoida =====
- Family Cyclopidae
  - Afrocyclops pauliani

===== Order Decapoda =====
- Family Atyidae
  - Syncaris pasadenae

==== Class Diplopoda ====
===== Order Spirobolida =====
- Family Pachybolidae
  - Eucarlia

==== Class Insecta ====
===== Order Coleoptera =====
- Family Carabidae
  - Mecodema punctellum
- Family Curculionidae
  - Dryophthorus distinguendus
  - Oedemasylus laysanensis
  - Pentarthrum blackburni
  - Rhyncogonus bryani
  - Trigonoscuta rossi
  - Trigonoscuta yorbalindae
- Family Dytiscidae
  - Hygrotus artus
  - Megadytes ducalis
  - Rhantus novacaledoniae
  - Rhantus orbignyi
  - Rhantus papuanus
  - Perrin's cave beetle (Siettitia balsetensis)

===== Order Diptera =====
- Family Dolichopodidae
  - Campsicnemus mirabilis
- Family Drosophilidae
  - Drosophila lanaiensis

===== Order Ephemeroptera =====
- Family Ephemeridae
  - Pentagenia robusta
- Family Siphlonuridae
  - Acanthometropus pecatonica

===== Order Hemiptera =====
- Family Pseudococcidae
  - Clavicoccus erinaceus
  - Phyllococcus oahuensis

===== Order Lepidoptera =====
- Family Geometridae
  - Kona giant looper moth (Scotorythra megalophylla)
  - Scotorythra nesiotes
  - Tritocleis microphylla
- Family Libytheidae
  - Libythea cinyras
- Family Lycaenidae
  - Deloneura immaculata
  - Xerces blue (Glaucopsyche xerces)
  - Lepidochrysops hypopolia
- Family Nepticulidae
  - Phleophagan chestnut moth (Ectodemia phleophaga)
- Family Noctuidae
  - Poko noctuid moth (Agrotis crinigera)
  - Midway noctuid moth (Agrotis fasciata)
  - Kerr's noctuid moth (Agrotis kerri)
  - Laysan noctuid moth (Agrotis laysanensis)
  - Agrotis photophila
  - Procellaris agrotis noctuid moth (Agrotis procellaris)
  - Confused moth (Helicoverpa confusa)
  - Minute noctuid moth (Helicoverpa minuta)
  - Laysan dropseed noctuid moth (Hypena laysanensis)
  - Hilo noctuid moth (Hypena newelli)
  - Lovegrass noctuid moth (Hypena plagiota)
  - Kaholuamano noctuid moth (Hypena senicula)
- Family Pyralidae
  - Genophantis leahi
  - Oeobia sp. nov.
- Family Tischeriidae
  - Chestnut clearwing moth (Tischeria perplexa)
- Family Zygaenidae
  - Levuana moth (Levuana iridescens)

===== Order Odonata =====
- Family Coenagrionidae
  - Megalagrion jugorum
- Family Libellulidae
  - Sympetrum dilatatum

===== Order Orthoptera =====
- Family Acrididae
  - Conozoa hyalina
- Family Tettigoniidae
  - Neduba extincta

===== Order Phasmatodea =====
- Family Diapheromeridae
  - Pseudobactricia ridleyi

===== Order Plecoptera =====
- Family Chloroperlidae
  - Alloperla roberti

===== Order Trichoptera =====
- Family Hydropsychidae
  - Tobias' caddisfly (Hydropsyche tobiasi)
- Family Leptoceridae
  - Triaenodes phalacris
  - Triaenodes tridontus
- Family Rhyacophilidae
  - Rhyacophila amabilis

=== Phylum Chordata ===
==== Class Cephalaspidomorphi ====
===== Order Cypriniformes =====
- Family Catostomidae
  - Snake River sucker (Chasmistes muriei)
  - Harelip sucker (Moxostoma lacerum)
- Family Cyprinidae
  - Acanthobrama hulensis
  - Beyşehir bleak (Alburnus akili)
  - İznik shemaya (Alburnus nicaeensis)
  - Barbus microbarbis
  - Chondrostoma scodrense
  - Cyprinus yilongensis
  - Mexican dace (Evarra bustamantei)
  - Plateau chub (Evarra eigenmanni)
  - Endorheic chub (Evarra tlahuacensis)
  - Thicktail chub (Gila crassicauda)
  - Pahranagat spinedace (Lepidomeda altivelis)
  - Durango shiner (Notropis aulidion)
  - Phantom shiner (Notropis orca)
  - Salado shiner (Notropis saladonis)
  - Clear Lake splittail (Pogonichthys ciscoides)
  - Las Vegas dace (Rhinichthys deaconi)
  - Danube delta gudgeon (Romanogobio antipai)
  - Stumptooth minnow (Stypodon signifer)

===== Order Cyprinodontiformes =====
- Family Cyprinodontidae
  - Aphanius splendens
  - Cyprinodon ceciliae
  - Cachorrito de la Trinidad (Cyprinodon inmemoriam)
  - Parras pupfish (Cyprinodon latifasciatus)
  - Perritos de sandia (Cyprinodon spp.)
  - Ash Meadows killifish (Empetrichthys merriami)
- Family Poeciliidae
  - Aplocheilichthys sp. nov. 'Naivasha'
  - Amistad gambusia (Gambusia amistadensis)
  - San Marcos gambusia (Gambusia georgei)
  - Pantanodon madagascariensis

===== Order Gasterosteiformes =====
- Family Gasterosteidae
  - Techirghiol stickleback (Gasterosteus crenobiontus)

===== Order Perciformes =====
- Family Cichlidae
  - Ctenochromis pectoralis
  - Haplochromis arcanus
  - Haplochromis artaxerxes
  - Haplochromis bartoni
  - Haplochromis boops
  - Haplochromis cassius
  - Haplochromis decticostoma
  - Haplochromis dentex
  - Haplochromis estor
  - Haplochromis flavipinnis
  - Haplochromis gilberti
  - Haplochromis gowersi
  - Haplochromis longirostris
  - Haplochromis macrognathus
  - Haplochromis mandibularis
  - Haplochromis michaeli
  - Haplochromis mylergates
  - Haplochromis nanoserranus
  - Haplochromis nigrescens
  - Haplochromis nyanzae
  - Haplochromis obtusidens
  - Haplochromis pachycephalus
  - Haplochromis paraguiarti
  - Haplochromis paraplagiostoma
  - Haplochromis percoides
  - Haplochromis pharyngomylus
  - Haplochromis prognathus
  - Haplochromis pseudopellegrini
  - Haplochromis teegelaari
  - Haplochromis thuragnathus
  - Ptychochromis onilahy
  - Ptychochromis sp. nov. 'Kotro'
  - Ptychochromoides itasy
  - Pyxichromis parorthostoma
  - Tristramella intermedia
  - Tristramella magdelainae
  - Xystichromis bayoni
- Family Percidae
  - Maryland darter (Etheostoma sellare)

===== Order Salmoniformes =====
- Family Retropinnidae
  - New Zealand grayling (Prototroctes oxyrhynchus)
- Family Salmonidae
  - Longjaw cisco (Coregonus alpenae)
  - Coregonus bezola
  - Coregonus fera
  - Coregonus gutturosus
  - Gravenche (Coregonus hiemalis)
  - Deepwater cisco (Coregonus johannae)
  - Blackfin cisco (Coregonus nigripinnis)
  - Coregonus restrictus
  - Salmo pallaryi
  - Silver trout (Salvelinus agassizi)
  - Salvelinus neocomensis
  - Salvelinus profundus

===== Order Scorpaeniformes =====
- Family Cottidae
  - Utah Lake sculpin (Cottus echinatus)

===== Order Siluriformes =====
- Family Trichomycteridae
  - Rhizosomichthys totae

==== Class Amphibia ====
===== Order Anura =====
- Family Bufonidae
  - Atelopus vogli
  - Golden toad (Incilius periglenes)
- Family Dicroglossidae
  - Nannophrys guentheri
- Family Hylidae
  - Phrynomedusa fimbriata
- Family Myobatrachidae
  - Gastric-brooding frog (Rheobatrachus silus)
  - Mount Glorious day frog (Taudactylus diurnus)
- Family Ranidae
  - Vegas Valley leopard frog (Lithobates fisheri)
- Family Rhacophoridae
  - Philautus adspersus
  - Philautus dimbullae
  - Philautus eximius
  - Philautus extirpo
  - Philautus halyi
  - Philautus leucorhinus
  - Philautus maia
  - Philautus malcolmsmithi
  - Philautus nanus
  - Philautus nasutus
  - Philautus oxyrhynchus
  - Philautus pardus
  - Philautus rugatus
  - Philautus stellatus
  - Philautus temporalis
  - Philautus variabilis
  - Philautus zal
  - Philautus zimmeri

===== Order Urodela =====
- Family Plethodontidae
  - Ainsworth's salamander (Plethodon ainsworthi)
- Family Salamandridae
  - Yunnan lake newt (Cynops wolterstorffi)

==== Class Aves ====
===== Order Accipitriformes =====
- Family Accipitridae
  - Bermuda hawk (Bermuteo avivorus)

===== Order Anseriformes =====
- Family Anatidae
  - Réunion sheldgoose (Alopochen kervazoi)
  - Mauritius sheldgoose (Alopochen mauritianus)
  - Amsterdam wigeon (Anas marecula)
  - Mascarene teal (Anas theodori)
  - Labrador duck (Camptorhynchus labradorius)
  - Finsch's duck (Chenonetta finschi)
  - New Zealand merganser (Mergus australis)

===== Order Bucerotiformes =====
- Family Upupidae
  - Saint Helena hoopoe (Upupa antaios)

===== Order Caprimulgiformes =====
- Family Trochilidae
  - Brace's emerald (Chlorostilbon bracei)
  - Gould's emerald (Chlorostilbon elegans)

===== Order Charadriiformes =====
- Family Alcidae
  - Great auk (Pinguinus impennis)
- Family Haematopodidae
  - Canary Islands oystercatcher (Haematopus meadewaldoi)
- Family Scolopacidae
  - North Island snipe (Coenocorypha barrierensis)
  - South Island snipe (Coenocorypha iredalei)
  - Slender-billed curlew (Numenius tenuirostris))
  - Christmas sandpiper (Prosobonia cancellata)
  - Moorea sandpiper (Prosobonia ellisi)
  - Tahiti sandpiper (Prosobonia leucoptera)

===== Order Columbiformes =====
- Family Columbidae
  - Mauritius blue pigeon (Alectroenas nitidissimus)
  - Rodrigues blue pigeon (Alectroenas payandeei)
  - Tanna ground dove (Alopecoenas ferruginea)
  - Thick-billed ground dove (Alopecoenas salamonis)
  - Spotted green pigeon (Caloenas maculata)
  - Ryukyu wood pigeon (Columba jouyi)
  - Mauritian wood pigeon (Columba thiriouxi)
  - Bonin wood pigeon (Columba versicolor)
  - Passenger pigeon (Ectopistes migratorius)
  - Choiseul pigeon (Microgoura meeki)
  - Mauritian turtle dove (Nesoenas cicur)
  - Réunion pink pigeon (Nesoenas duboisi)
  - Rodrigues pigeon (Nesoenas rodericanus)
  - Rodrigues solitaire (Pezophaps solitaria)
  - Red-moustached fruit dove (Ptilinopus mercierii)
  - Dodo (Raphus cucullatus)

===== Order Cuculiformes =====
- Family Cuculidae
  - Delalande's coua (Coua delalandei)
  - Saint Helena cuckoo (Nannococcyx psix)

===== Order Falconiformes =====
- Family Falconidae
  - Guadalupe caracara (Caracara lutosa)
  - Réunion kestrel (Falco duboisi)

===== Order Galliformes =====
- Family Phasianidae
  - New Zealand quail (Coturnix novaezelandiae)

===== Order Gruiformes =====
- Family Rallidae
  - Red rail (Aphanapteryx bonasia)
  - Saint Helena rail (Atlantisia podarces)
  - Chatham rail (Cabalus modestus)
  - Hawkins' rail (Diaphorapteryx hawkinsi)
  - Réunion rail (Dryolimnas augusti)
  - Rodrigues rail (Erythromachus leguati)
  - Mascarene coot (Fulica newtonii)
  - Tristan moorhen (Gallinula nesiotis)
  - Bar-winged rail (Nesoclopeus poeciloptera)
  - Dieffenbach's rail (Hypotaenidia dieffenbachii)
  - Tahiti rail (Hypotaenidia pacifica)
  - Wake Island rail (Hypotaenidia wakensis)
  - Ascension crake (Mundia elpenor)
  - Lord Howe swamphen (Porphyrio albus)
  - Réunion swamphen (Porphyrio coerulescens)
  - New Caledonian gallinule (Porphyrio kukwiedei)
  - North Island takahē (Porphyrio mantelli)
  - Marquesas swamphen (Porphyrio paepae)
  - Hodgens' waterhen (Tribonyx hodgenorum)
  - Saint Helena crake (Zapornia astrictocarpus)
  - Kosrae crake (Zapornia monasa)
  - Tahiti crake (Zapornia nigra)
  - Laysan rail (Zapornia palmeri)
  - Hawaiian rail (Zapornia sandwichensis)

===== Order Passeriformes =====
- Family Acanthisittidae
  - Lyall's wren (Traversia lyalli)
  - Bushwren (Xenicus longipes)
- Family Acanthizidae
  - Lord Howe gerygone (Gerygone insularis)
- Family Acrocephalidae
  - Mangareva reed warbler (Acrocephalus astrolabii)
  - Nightingale reed warbler (Acrocephalus luscinius)
  - Garrett's reed warbler (Acrocephalus musae)
  - Aguiguan reed warbler (Acrocephalus nijoi)
  - Pagan reed warbler (Acrocephalus yamashinae)
- Family Callaeatidae
  - Huia (Heteralocha acutirostris)
- Family Fringillidae
  - Oahu 'akialoa (Akialoa ellisiana)
  - Maui Nui ʻakialoa (Akialoa lanaiensis)
  - Lesser ʻakialoa (Akialoa obscura)
  - Kauaʻi ʻakialoa (Akialoa stejnegeri)
  - Bonin grosbeak (Carpodacus ferreorostris or Chaunoproctus ferreorostris)
  - Kona grosbeak (Chloridops kona)
  - ʻUla-ʻai-hawane (Ciridops anna)
  - Black mamo (Drepanis funerea)
  - Hawaii mamo (Drepanis pacifica)
  - Lānaʻi hookbill (Dysmorodrepanis munroi)
  - Oahu 'akialoa (Hemignathus ellisianus)
  - Oʻahu nukupuʻu (Hemignathus lucidus)
  - Lesser ʻakialoa (Hemignathus obscurus)
  - Greater ʻamakihi (Hemignathus sagittirostris)
  - Laysan honeycreeper (Himatione fraithii)
  - Oʻahu ʻakepa (Loxops wolstenholmei)
  - Kākāwahie (Paroreomyza flammea)
  - Lesser koa finch (Rhodacanthis flaviceps)
  - Greater koa finch (Rhodacanthis palmeri)
  - Greater ʻamakihi (Viridonia sagittirostris)
- Family Icteridae
  - Slender-billed grackle (Quiscalus palustris)
- Family Locustellidae
  - Chatham fernbird (Poodytes rufescens)
- Family Meliphagidae
  - Chatham bellbird (Anthornis melanocephala)
- Family Mohoidae
  - Kioea (Chaetoptila angustipluma)
  - Oʻahu ʻōʻō (Moho apicalis)
  - Bishop's ʻōʻō (Moho bishopi)
  - Kauaʻi ʻōʻō (Moho braccatus)
  - Hawaiʻi ʻōʻō (Moho nobilis)
- Family Monarchidae
  - Guam flycatcher (Myiagra freycineti)
  - Eiao monarch (Pomarea fluxa)
  - Nuku Hiva monarch (Pomarea nukuhivae)
  - Maupiti monarch (Pomarea pomarea)
- Family Passerellidae
  - Bermuda towhee (Pipilo naufragus)
- Family Ploceidae
  - Réunion fody (Foudia delloni)
- Family Sturnidae
  - Kosrae starling (Aplonis corvina)
  - Tasman starling (Aplonis fusca)
  - Mauke starling (Aplonis mavornata)
  - Raiatea starling (Aplonis ulietensis)
  - Hoopoe starling (Fregilupus varius)
  - Rodrigues starling (Necropsar rodericanus)
- Family Sylviidae
  - Chatham fernbird (Bowdleria rufescens)
  - Aldabra brush warbler (Nesillas aldabrana)
- Family Turdidae
  - Kāmaʻo (Myadestes myadestinus)
  - ʻĀmaui (Myadestes woahensis)
  - Grand Cayman thrush (Turdus ravidus)
  - Bonin thrush (Zoothera terrestris)
- Family Turnagridae
  - South Island piopio (Turnagra capensis)
  - North Island piopio (Turnagra tanagra)
- Family Tyrannidae
  - San Cristóbal flycatcher (Pyrocephalus dubius)
- Family Zosteropidae
  - Bridled white-eye (Zosterops conspicillatus)
  - Marianne white-eye (Zosterops semiflavus)
  - Robust white-eye (Zosterops strenuus)

===== Order Pelecaniformes =====
- Family Ardeidae
  - New Zealand bittern (Ixobrychus novaezelandiae)
  - Bermuda night heron (Nyctanassa carcinocatactes)
  - Réunion night heron (Nycticorax duboisi)
  - Mauritius night heron (Nycticorax mauritianus)
  - Rodrigues night heron (Nycticorax megacephalus)
- Family Threskiornithidae
  - Réunion ibis (Threskiornis solitarius)

===== Order Piciformes =====
- Family Picidae
  - Bermuda flicker (Colaptes oceanicus)

===== Order Podicipediformes =====
- Family Podicipedidae
  - Colombian grebe (Podiceps andinus)
  - Atitlán grebe (Podilymbus gigas)
  - Alaotra grebe (Tachybaptus rufolavatus)

===== Order Procellariiformes =====
- Family Procellariidae
  - Olson's petrel (Bulweria bifax)
  - Saint Helena petrel (Pterodroma rupinarum)

===== Order Psittaciformes =====
- Family Nestoridae
  - Norfolk kaka (Nestor productus)
- Family Psittacidae
  - Martinique amazon (Amazona martinicana)
  - Guadeloupe amazon (Amazona violacea)
  - Cuban macaw (Ara tricolor)
  - Carolina parakeet (Conuropsis carolinensis)
  - Society parakeet (Cyanoramphus ulietanus)
  - Black-fronted parakeet (Cyanoramphus zealandicus)
  - Oceanic eclectus parrot (Eclectus infectus)
  - Mascarene grey parakeet (Lophopsittacus bensoni)
  - Broad-billed parrot (Lophopsittacus mauritianus)
  - Mascarene parrot (Mascarinus mascarin)
  - Rodrigues parrot (Necropsittacus rodricanus)
  - Paradise parrot (Psephotellus pulcherrimus)
  - Guadeloupe parakeet (Psittacara labati)
  - Newton's parakeet (Psittacula exsul)
  - Seychelles parakeet (Psittacula wardi)

===== Order Strigiformes =====
- Family Strigidae
  - Bermuda saw-whet owl (Aegolius gradyi)
  - Réunion scops owl (Mascarenotus grucheti)
  - Rodrigues scops owl (Mascarenotus murivorus)
  - Mauritius scops owl (Mascarenotus sauzieri)
  - Laughing owl (Sceloglaux albifacies)

===== Order Struthioniformes =====
- Family Casuariidae
  - King Island emu (Dromaius novaehollandiae minor)
  - Kangaroo Island emu (Dromaius novaehollandiae baudinianus)
  - Tasmanian emu (Dromaius novaehollandiae diemenensis)

===== Order Suliformes =====
- Family Phalacrocoracidae
  - Spectacled cormorant (Phalacrocorax perspicillatus)

==== Class Mammalia ====
===== Order Carnivora =====
- Family Canidae
  - Subfamily Caninae
    - Falkland Islands wolf (Dusicyon australis)
    - Dusicyon avus
    - Protocyon troglodytes
    - Theriodictis tarijense
    - Canis dirus
    - Japanese wolf (Canis lupus hodophilax)
    - Hokkaido wolf (Canis lupus hattai)
- Family Felidae
  - Barbary lion (Panthera leo atlasis)
  - Bali tiger (Panthera tigris sondaica)
  - Caspian tiger (Panthera tigris tigris)
  - Javan tiger (Panthera tigris sondaica)
  - Formosan clouded leopard (Neofelis nebulosa brachyura)
- Family Eupleridae
  - Cryptoprocta spelea
- Family Mustelidae
  - Sea mink (Neogale macrodon)
- Family Otariidae
  - Japanese sea lion (Zalophus japonicus)
- Family Phocidae
  - Caribbean monk seal (Neomonachus tropicalis)
- Family Ursidae
  - Atlas bear (Ursus arctos crowtheri)
  - California grizzly bear (Ursus arctos californicus)

===== Order Artiodactyla =====
- Family Bovidae
  - Aurochs (Bos primigenius)
  - Queen of Sheba's gazelle (Gazella bilkis)
  - Bluebuck (Hippotragus leucophaeus)
  - Carpathian wisent
  - Caucasian wisent
- Family Cervidae
  - Schomburgk's deer (Rucervus schomburgki)
- Family Equidae
  - Quagga (Equus quagga quagga)
- Family Hippopotamidae
  - Malagasy hippopotamus (Hippopotamus lemerlei)
  - Malagasy pygmy hippopotamus (Choeropsis madagascariensis)

===== Order Chiroptera =====
- Family Vespertilionidae
  - Christmas Island pipistrelle (Pipistrellus murrayi)
  - Lord Howe long-eared bat (Nyctophilus howensis)
  - Bonin Pipistrelle (Pipistrellus sturdeei)
- Family Pteropodidae
  - Dusky flying fox (Pteropus forensic)
  - Large Palau flying fox (Pteropus pilosus)
  - Large Samoan flying fox (Pteropus coxi)
  - Small Mauritian flying fox (Pteropus subniger)
  - Guam flying fox (Pteropus tokudae)

===== Order Dasyuromorphia =====
- Family Thylacinidae
  - Thylacine (Thylacinus cynocephalus)

===== Order Didelphimorphia =====
- Family Didelphidae
  - Red-bellied gracile opossum (Cryptonanus ignitus)

===== Order Diprotodontia =====
- Family Macropodidae
  - Lake Mackay hare-wallaby (Lagorchestes asomatus)
  - Eastern hare-wallaby (Lagorchestes leporides)
  - Toolache wallaby (Macropus greyi)
  - Crescent nail-tail wallaby (Onychogalea lunata)
- Family Potoroidae
  - Desert bettong (Bettongia anhydra)
  - Nullarbor dwarf bettong (Bettongia pusilla)
  - Desert rat-kangaroo (Caloprymnus campestris)
  - Broad-faced potoroo (Potorous platyops)

===== Order Eulipotyphla =====
- Family Nesophontidae
  - Puerto Rican nesophontes (Nesophontes edithae)
  - Atalaye nesophontes (Nesophontes hypomicrus)
  - Greater Cuban nesophontes (Nesophontes major)
  - Western Cuban nesophontes (Nesophontes micrus)
  - St. Michel nesophontes (Nesophontes paramicrus)
  - Haitian nesophontes (Nesophontes zamicrus)
- Family Solenodontidae
  - Marcano's solenodon (Solenodon marcanoi)
- Family Soricidae
  - Christmas Island shrew (Crocidura trichura)

===== Order Lagomorpha =====
- Family Prolagidae
  - Sardinian pika (Prolagus sardus)

===== Order Peramelemorphia =====
- Family Chaeropodidae
  - Pig-footed bandicoot (Chaeropus ecaudatus)
- Family Peramelidae
  - Desert bandicoot (Perameles eremiana)
- Family Thylacomyidae
  - Lesser bilby (Macrotis leucura)

===== Order Primates =====
- Family Palaeopropithecidae
  - Palaeopropithecus ingens
- Family Pitheciidae
  - Jamaican monkey (Xenothrix mcgregori)

===== Order Rodentia =====
- Family Capromyidae
  - Cuban coney (Geocapromys columbianus)
  - Little Swan Island hutia (Geocapromys thoracatus)
  - Imposter hutia (Hexolobodon phenax)
  - Montane hutia (Isolobodon montanus)
  - Puerto Rican hutia (Isolobodon portoricensis)
  - Samaná hutia (Plagiodontia ipnaeum)
- Family Chinchillidae
  - Lagostomus crassus
- Family Cricetidae
  - Candango mouse (Juscelinomys candango)
  - Martinique giant rice rat (Megalomys desmarestii)
  - Saint Lucia giant rice-rat (Megalomys luciae)
  - Galapagos giant rat (Megaoryzomys curioi)
  - Anthony's woodrat (Neotoma anthonyi)
  - Bunker's woodrat (Neotoma bunkeri)
  - San Martín Island woodrat (Neotoma martinensis)
  - Darwin's nesoryzomys (Nesoryzomys darwini)
  - Santa Cruz nesoryzomys (Nesoryzomys indefessus)
  - Vespucci's rodent (Noronhomys vespuccii)
  - St. Vincent colilargo (Oligoryzomys victus)
  - Jamaican rice rat (Oryzomys antillarum)
  - Oryzomys nelsoni
  - Pennatomys nivalis
  - Pemberton's deer mouse (Peromyscus pembertoni)
- Family Echimyidae
  - Oriente cave rat (Boromys offella)
  - Torre's cave rat (Boromys torrei)
  - Hispaniolan edible rat (Brotomys voratus)
  - Insular cave rat (Heteropsomys insulans)
- Family Muridae
  - White-footed rabbit-rat (Conilurus albipes)
  - Capricorn rabbit rat (Conilurus capricornensis)
  - Buhler's coryphomys (Coryphomys buehleri)
  - Lesser stick-nest rat (Leporillus apicalis)
  - Bramble Cay melomys (Melomys rubicola)
  - Short-tailed hopping mouse (Notomys amplus)
  - Long-tailed hopping mouse (Notomys longicaudatus)
  - Big-eared hopping mouse (Notomys macrotis)
  - Darling Downs hopping mouse (Notomys mordax)
  - Great hopping mouse (Notomys robustus)
  - Pseudomys auritus
  - Blue-gray mouse (Pseudomys glaucus)
  - Gould's mouse (Pseudomys gouldii)
  - Maclear's rat (Rattus macleari)
  - Bulldog rat (Rattus nativitatis)

===== Order Sirenia =====
- Family Dugongidae
  - Steller's sea cow (Hydrodamalis gigas)

==== Class Reptilia ====
===== Order Squamata =====
- Family Bolyeridae
  - Round Island burrowing boa (Bolyeria multocarinata)
- Family Cordylidae
  - Eastwood's long-tailed seps (Tetradactylus eastwoodae)
- Family Dipsadidae
  - Underwood's mussurana (Clelia errabunda)
  - Barbados racer (Erythrolamprus perfuscus)
- Family Gekkonidae
  - Delcourt's giant gecko (Hoplodactylus delcourti)
  - Rodrigues day gecko (Phelsuma edwardnewtoni)
  - Rodrigues giant day gecko (Phelsuma gigas)
- Family Scincidae
  - Alinea luciae
  - Copeoglossum redondae
  - Mauritian giant skink (Leiolopisma mauritiana)
  - Cape Verde giant skink (Macroscincus coctei)
  - Tonga ground skink (Tachygyia microlepis)
- Family Teiidae
  - Ameiva cineracea
  - Martinique giant ameiva (Ameiva major)
  - Contomastix charrua
- Family Tropiduridae
  - Leiocephalus cuneus
  - Navassa curly-tailed lizard (Leiocephalus eremitus)
  - Martinique curly-tailed lizard (Leiocephalus herminieri)
- Family Typhlopidae
  - Typhlops cariei

===== Order Testudines =====
- Family Testudinidae
  - Pinta Island giant tortoise (Chelonoidis abingdonii)
  - Floreana Island giant tortoise (Chelonoidis nigra)
  - Réunion giant tortoise (Cylindraspis indica)
  - Saddle-backed Mauritius giant tortoise (Cylindraspis inepta)
  - Domed Rodrigues giant tortoise (Cylindraspis peltastes)
  - Domed Mauritius giant tortoise (Cylindraspis triserrata)
  - Saddle-backed Rodrigues giant tortoise (Cylindraspis vosmaeri)

=== Phylum Mollusca ===
==== Class Bivalvia ====
===== Order Unionida =====
- Family Unionidae
  - Coosa elktoe (Alasmidonta mccordi)
  - Carolina elktoe (Alasmidonta robusta)
  - Ochlockonee arcmussel (Alasmidonta wrightiana)
  - Arc-form pearly mussel (Epioblasma arcaeformis)
  - Angled riffleshell (Epioblasma biemarginata)
  - Arcuate pearly mussel (Epioblasma flexuosa)
  - Epioblasma florentina florentina
  - Acorn pearly mussel (Epioblasma haysiana)
  - Narrow catspaw (Epioblasma lenior)
  - Forkshell (Epioblasma lewisii)
  - Fine-rayed pearly mussel (Epioblasma personata)
  - Nearby pearly mussel (Epioblasma propinqua)
  - Sampson's naiad (Epioblasma sampsonii)
  - Cumberland leafshell (Epioblasma stewardsonii)
  - Epioblasma torulosa gubernaculum
  - Epioblasma torulosa torulosa
  - Turgid riffle shell (Epioblasma turgidula)
  - Germainaia geayi
  - Lined pocketbook (Lampsilis binominata)
  - Leptodea fragilis (Medionidus mcglameriae)
  - Highnut (Pleurobema altum)
  - Hazel pigtoe (Pleurobema avellanum)
  - Scioto pigtoe (Pleurobema bournianum)
  - Yellow pigtoe (Pleurobema flavidulum)
  - Brown pigtoe (Pleurobema hagleri)
  - Georgia pigtoe (Pleurobema hanleyianum)
  - Alabama pigtoe (Pleurobema johannis)
  - Coosa pigtoe (Pleurobema murrayense)
  - Longnut (Pleurobema nucleopsis)
  - Dark pigtoe (Pleurobema rubellum)
  - Heavy pigtoe (Pleurobema taitianum)
  - Alabama clubshell (Pleurobema troschelianum)
  - True pigtoe (Pleurobema verum)
  - Unio cariei
  - Unio madagascariensis
  - Unio malgachensis

==== Class Gastropoda ====
===== Architaenioglossa =====
- Family Cyclophoridae
  - Cyclophorus horridulum
  - Cyclosurus mariei
- Family Diplommatinidae
  - Plectostoma sciaphilum
- Family Neocyclotidae
  - Amphicyclotulus guadeloupensis
  - Incerticyclus cinereus
  - Incerticyclus martinicensis

===== Hygrophila =====
- Family Physidae
  - Fish Lake physa (Physella microstriata)
- Family Planorbidae
  - Shoal sprite (Amphigyra alabamensis)
  - Neoplanorbis carinatus
  - Neoplanorbis smithii
  - Neoplanorbis umbilicatus
  - Acorn ramshorn (Planorbella multivolvis)

===== Littorinimorpha =====
- Family Hydrobiidae
  - Angrobia dulvertonensis
  - Beddomeia tumida
  - Belgrandiella intermedia
  - Bythinella intermedia
  - Cahaba pebblesnail (Clappia cahabensis)
  - Clappia umbilicata
  - Graecoanatolica macedonica
  - Littoridina gaudichaudii
  - Ohridohauffenia drimica
  - Posticobia norfolkensis
  - Corded pyrg (Pyrgulopsis nevadensis)
  - Pyrgulopsis olivacea
  - Reverse pebblesnail (Somatogyrus alcoviensis)
  - Ouachita pebblesnail (Somatogyrus amnicoloides)
  - Thick-lipped pebblesnail (Somatogyrus crassilabris)
  - Channeled pebblesnail (Somatogyrus wheeleri)
- Family Littorinidae
  - Littoraria flammea
- Family Pomatiidae
  - Tropidophora desmazuresi
  - Tropidophora semilineata

===== Patellogastropoda =====
- Family Lottiidae
  - Lottia alveus
- Family Nacellidae
  - Collisella edmitchelli

===== Sorbeoconcha =====
- Family Pleuroceridae
  - Boulder snail (Athearnia crassa)
  - Short-spired elimia (Elimia brevis)
  - Closed elimia (Elimia clausa)
  - Elimia fusiformis
  - Elimia gibbera
  - High-spired elimia (Elimia hartmaniana)
  - Constricted elimia (Elimia impressa)
  - Hearty elimia (Elimia jonesi)
  - Elimia lachryma
  - Ribbed elimia (Elimia laeta)
  - Elimia macglameriana
  - Rough-lined elimia (Elimia pilsbryi)
  - Pupa elimia (Elimia pupaeformis)
  - Pygmy elimia (Elimia pygmaea)
  - Cobble elimia (Elimia vanuxemiana)
  - Puzzle elimia (Elimia varians)
  - Excised slitshell (Gyrotoma excisa)
  - Striate slitshell (Gyrotoma lewisii)
  - Pagoda slitshell (Gyrotoma pagoda)
  - Ribbed slitshell (Gyrotoma pumila)
  - Pyramid slitshell (Gyrotoma pyramidata)
  - Round slitshell (Gyrotoma walkeri)
  - Agate rocksnail (Leptoxis clipeata)
  - Oblong rocksnail (Leptoxis compacta)
  - Interrupted rocksnail (Leptoxis foremanii)
  - Maiden rocksnail (Leptoxis formosa)
  - Rotund rocksnail (Leptoxis ligata)
  - Lyrate rocksnail (Leptoxis lirata)
  - Bigmouth rocksnail (Leptoxis occultata)
  - Coosa rocksnail (Leptoxis showalterii)
  - Leptoxis torrefacta
  - Striped rocksnail (Leptoxis vittata)

===== Stylommatophora =====
- Family Achatinellidae
  - Achatinella abbreviata
  - Achatinella apexfulva vittata
  - Achatinella buddii
  - Achatinella bulimoides rosea
  - Achatinella caesia
  - Achatinella casta
  - Achatinella decora
  - Achatinella dimorpha
  - Achatinella elegans
  - Achatinella juddii
  - Achatinella juncea
  - Achatinella lehuiensis
  - Achatinella livida
  - Achatinella papyracea
  - Achatinella spaldingi
  - Achatinella thaanumi
  - Achatinella valida
  - Auriculella expansa
  - Auriculella uniplicata
  - Lamellidea monodonta
  - Lamellidea nakadai
  - Newcombia philippiana
  - Partulina crassa
  - Partulina montagui
  - Perdicella fulgurans
  - Perdicella maniensis
  - Perdicella zebra
  - Perdicella zebrina
  - Tornelasmias capricorni
- Family Amastridae
  - Amastra albolabris
  - Amastra cornea
  - Amastra crassilabrum
  - Amastra elongata
  - Amastra forbesi
  - Amastra pellucida
  - Amastra porcus
  - Amastra reticulata
  - Amastra subrostrata
  - Amastra subsoror
  - Amastra tenuispira
  - Amastra umbilicata
  - Carelia anceophila
  - Carelia bicolor
  - Carelia cochlea
  - Carelia cumingiana
  - Carelia dolei
  - Carelia evelynae
  - Carelia glossema
  - Carelia hyattiana
  - Carelia kalalauensis
  - Carelia knudseni
  - Carelia lirata
  - Carelia lymani
  - Carelia mirabilis
  - Carelia necra
  - Carelia olivacea
  - Carelia paradoxa
  - Carelia periscelis
  - Carelia pilsbryi
  - Carelia sinclairi
  - Carelia tenebrosa
  - Carelia turricula
- Family Ariophantidae
  - Vitrinula chaunax
  - Vitrinula chichijimana
  - Vitrinula hahajimana
- Family Camaenidae
  - Periodontal desidens
- Family Cerastidae
  - Pachnodus curiosus
  - Pachnodus ladiguensis
  - Pachnodus velutinus
  - Rhachis comorensis
  - Rhachis sanguineus
  - Aldabra banded snail (Rhachistia aldabrae)
- Family Charopidae
  - Helenoconcha leptalea
  - Helenoconcha minutissima
  - Helenoconcha polyodon
  - Helenoconcha pseustes
  - Helenoconcha sexdentata
  - Helenodiscus bilamellata
  - Helenodiscus vernoni
  - Libera subcavernula
  - Libera tumuloides
  - Mautodontha acuticosta
  - Mautodontha consimilis
  - Mautodontha consobrina
  - Mautodontha maupiensis
  - Mautodontha parvidens
  - Mautodontha punctiperforata
  - Mautodontha saintjohni
  - Mautodontha subtilis
  - Mautodontha unilamellata
  - Mautodontha zebrina
  - Sinployea canalis
  - Sinployea decorticata
  - Sinployea harveyensis
  - Sinployea otareae
  - Sinployea planospira
  - Sinployea proxima
  - Sinployea rudis
  - Sinployea tenuicostata
  - Sinployea youngi
  - Taipidon anceyana
  - Taipidon marquesana
  - Taipidon octolamellata
- Family Endodontidae
  - Hirasea planulata
  - Pseudohelenoconcha spurca
  - Thaumatodon multilamellata
- Family Euconulidae
  - Caldwellia philyrina
  - Colparion madgei
  - Ctenoglypta newtoni
  - Dupontia proletaria
  - Pachystyla rufozonata
- Family Helicarionidae
  - Advena campbelli
  - Mount Matafao different snail (Diastole matafaoi)
  - Erepta nevilli
  - Harmogenanina linophora
  - Harmogenanina subdetecta
  - Nancibella quintalia
  - Panulena perrugosa
  - Quintalia flosculus
  - Quintalia stoddartii
- Family Helicidae
  - Pseudocampylaea loweii
- Family Hygromiidae
  - Trochoidea picardi
- Family Lauriidae
  - Leiostyla lamellosa
- Family Oleacinidae
  - Oleacina guadeloupensis
- Family Orthalicidae
  - Leucocharis loyaltyensis
  - Leucocharis porphyrocheila
  - Lord Howe flax snail (Placostylus bivaricosus etheridgei)
  - Placostylus cuniculinsulae
  - Tomigerus gibberulus
  - Tomigerus turbinatus
- Family Partulidae
  - Partula approximata
  - Partula arguta
  - Partula atilis
  - Partula attenuata
  - Partula aurantia
  - Partula auriculata
  - Partula bilineata
  - Partula callifera
  - Partula candida
  - Partula castanea
  - Partula cedista
  - Partula citrina
  - Partula compacta
  - Partula crassilabris
  - Partula cuneata
  - Partula cytherea
  - Partula dentifera
  - Partula dolichostoma
  - Partula dolorosa
  - Partula eremita
  - Partula exigua
  - Partula faba
  - Partula filosa
  - Partula formosa
  - Partula fusca
  - Partula garretti
  - Partula imperforata
  - Partula jackieburchi
  - Partula labrusca
  - Partula langfordi
  - Partula leptochila
  - Partula levilineata
  - Partula levistriata
  - Partula lugubris
  - Partula lutea
  - Partula microstoma
  - Partula navigatoria
  - Partula ovalis
  - Partula planilabrum
  - Partula producta
  - Partula protea
  - Partula protracta
  - Partula radiata
  - Partula raiatensis
  - Partula remota
  - Partula robusta
  - Partula rustica
  - Partula sagitta
  - Mount Alifana partula (Partula salifana)
  - Partula salifera
  - Partula suturalis suturalis
  - Partula taeniata taeniata
  - Partula thalia
  - Partula turgida
  - Partula umbilicata
  - Partula variabilis
  - Partula vittata
  - Samoana inflata
  - Samoana jackieburchi
- Family Pupillidae
  - Lyropupa perlonga
  - Nesopupa turtoni
  - Pupilla obliquicosta
- Family Streptaxidae
  - Gibbus lyonetianus
  - Gonidomus newtoni
  - Gonospira nevilli
  - Gulella mayottensis
- Family Strophocheilidae
  - Megalobulimus cardosoi
- Family Subulinidae
  - Chilonopsis blofeldi
  - Chilonopsis exulatus
  - Chilonopsis helena
  - Chilonopsis melanoides
  - Chilonopsis nonpareil
  - Chilonopsis subplicatus
  - Chilonopsis subtruncatus
  - Chilonopsis turtoni
- Family Vertiginidae
  - Campolaemus perexilis
  - Gastrocopta chichijimana
  - Gastrocopta ogasawarana

== Kingdom Plantae ==
=== Division Bryophyta ===
==== Class Bryopsida ====
===== Order Bryales =====
- Family Brachytheciaceae
  - Flabellidium spinosum
- Family Neckeraceae
  - Neomacounia nitida

=== Division Polypodiophyta ===
==== Class Polypodiopsida ====
===== Order Polypodiales =====
- Family Pteridaceae
  - Adiantum lianxianense
  - Dryopteris ascensionis

=== Division Rhodophyta ===
==== Class Florideophyceae ====
===== Order Ceramiales =====
- Family Delesseriaceae
  - Vanvoorstia bennettiana

=== Division Tracheophyta ===
==== Class Liliopsida ====
===== Order Cyperales =====
- Family Cyperaceae
  - Cyperus rockii
- Family Gramineae
  - Cenchrus agrimonioides var. laysanensis
  - Sporobolus durus

==== Class Magnoliopsida ====
===== Order Apiales =====
- Family Umbelliferae
  - Sanicula kauaiensis

===== Order Asterales =====
- Family Compositae
  - Argyroxiphium virescens
  - Commidendrum gummiferum
  - Commidendrum robustum ssp. gummiferum
  - Delilia inelegans
  - Fitchia mangarevensis
  - Pluchea glutinosa
  - Psiadia schweinfurthii

===== Order Campanulales =====
- Family Campanulaceae
  - Clermontia multiflora
  - Cyanea arborea
  - Cyanea comata
  - Cyanea copelandii ssp. copelandii
  - Cyanea cylindrocalyx
  - Cyanea dolichopoda
  - Cyanea eleeleensis
  - Cyanea giffardii
  - Cyanea linearifolia
  - Cyanea marksii
  - Cyanea mauiensis
  - Cyanea minutiflora
  - Cyanea parvifolia
  - Cyanea pohaku
  - Cyanea pycnocarpa
  - Cyanea quercifolia
  - Cyanea sessilifolia
  - Cyanea superba ssp. regina
  - Delissea niihauensis
  - Delissea subcordata
  - Delissea undulata ssp. kauaiensis
  - Delissea undulata ssp. niihauensis

===== Order Caryophyllales =====
- Family Amaranthaceae
  - Achyranthes atollensis
  - Blutaparon rigidum
- Family Caryophyllaceae
  - Schiedea amplexicaulis

===== Order Celastrales =====
- Family Aquifoliaceae
  - Ilex gardneriana
  - Ilex ternatiflora

===== Order Dipsacales =====
- Family Valerianaceae
  - Valerianella affinis

===== Order Ebenales =====
- Family Sapotaceae
  - Chrysophyllum januariense
  - Madhuca insignis
  - Pouteria stenophylla
  - Pradosia argentea
  - Pradosia glaziovii
  - Pradosia mutisii

===== Order Euphorbiales =====
- Family Euphorbiaceae
  - Acalypha rubrinervis
  - Acalypha wilderi
  - Chamaesyce celastroides var. tomentella
  - Chamaesyce remyi var. hanaleiensis
  - Cnidoscolus fragrans

===== Order Fabales =====
- Family Leguminosae
  - Astragalus nitidiflorus
  - Crudia zeylanica
  - Cynometra beddomei
  - Erythrina schliebenii
  - Ormosia howii
  - Streblorrhiza speciosa

===== Order Lamiales =====
- Family Boraginaceae
  - Heliotropium pannifolium

===== Order Laurales =====
- Family Hernandiaceae
  - Hernandia drakeana

===== Order Malvales =====
- Family Malvaceae
  - Hibiscadelphus bombycinus
  - Hibiscadelphus crucibracteatus
  - Hibiscadelphus wilderianus
  - Kokia lanceolata
- Family Sterculiaceae
  - Byttneria ivorensis
  - Sterculia khasiana
  - Trochetiopsis melanoxylon

===== Order Myrtales =====
- Family Myrtaceae
  - Campomanesia lundiana
  - Gomidesia cambessedeana
  - Myrcia skeldingii
  - Psidium dumetorum
  - Xanthostemon sebertii
- Family Thymelaeaceae
  - Wikstroemia hanalei
  - Wikstroemia skottsbergiana

===== Order Proteales =====
- Family Proteaceae
  - Stenocarpus dumbeensis

===== Order Rhamnales =====
- Family Rhamnaceae
  - Nesiota elliptica

===== Order Rosales =====
- Family Chrysobalanaceae
  - Licania caldasiana
- Family Cunoniaceae
  - Weinmannia spiraeoides
- Family Rosaceae
  - Acaena exigua

===== Order Gentianales =====
- Family Apocynaceae
  - Ochrosia kilaueaensis
- Family Rubiaceae
  - Coffea lemblinii
  - Corynanthe brachythyrsus (syn. Pausinystalia brachythyrsum)
  - Guettarda retusa
  - Oldenlandia adscensionis

===== Order Santalales =====
- Family Santalaceae
  - Santalum fernandezianum

===== Order Sapindales =====
- Family Rutaceae
  - Galipea ossana
  - Melicope cruciata
  - Melicope haleakalae
  - Melicope macropus
  - Melicope nealae
  - Melicope obovata
  - Pelea obovata
- Family Sapindaceae
  - Cupaniopsis crassivalvis
  - Otophora unilocularis

===== Order Scrophulariales =====
- Family Gesneriaceae
  - Cyrtandra olona

===== Order Theales =====
- Family Dipterocarpaceae
  - Dipterocarpus cinereus
  - Hopea shingkeng

===== Order Violales =====
- Family Begoniaceae
  - Begonia eiromischa
- Family Flacourtiaceae
  - Casearia quinduensis
  - Casearia tinifolia
  - Ryania speciosa var. mutisii
