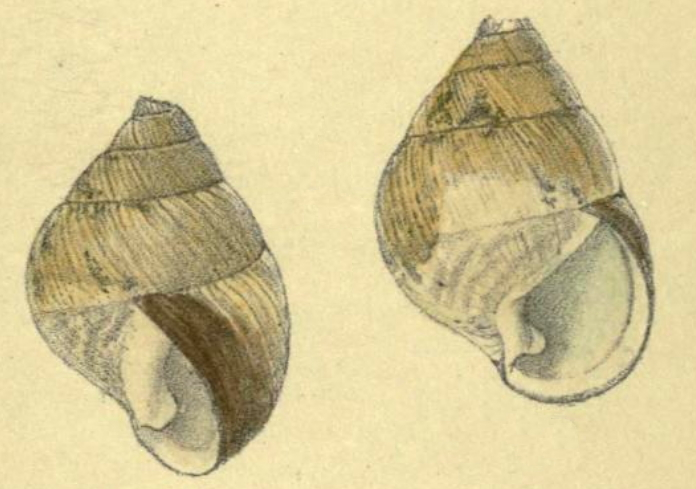
- Shell of Amastra nucula (holotype)

Scientific classification
- Domain: Eukaryota
- Kingdom: Animalia
- Phylum: Mollusca
- Class: Gastropoda
- Order: Stylommatophora
- Family: Amastridae
- Genus: Amastra
- Species: A. nucula

Binomial name
- Amastra nucula E. A. Smith, 1873

Synonyms
- Amastra (Amastra) nucula E. A. Smith, 1873 alternative representation

= Amastra nucula =

Species of mollusc

Amastra nucula is a species of air-breathing land snail, a terrestrial pulmonate gastropod mollusc in the family Amastridae.

== Description ==
The length of the shell attains 12 mm, its diameter 8 mm

The shell is globose-conic and dextral, adorned with fine growth striations and subtle malleations. Its surface is a dirty whitish color, partially covered with a brown-olivaceous cuticle. There are 5½ whorls, with the first 4½ being relatively flat and the final whorl globose. The suture is subtly crenulated.

The aperture is whitish, with a peristome that is noticeably thickened. The columellar fold is thin and delicate.

The shell's first whorl is broken, but the second exhibits fine, closely spaced, arcuate, and somewhat sharp irregular striations. Subsequent whorls are marked by light, irregular growth wrinkles, slightly accentuated near the suture, though not to the extent of creating pronounced crenulations. The body whorl features a delicate peripheral ridge in front, below which it displays distinct malleation with forward-descending facets. Above the periphery, the malleation is considerably weaker. A similar pattern of sculpture can be observed in some specimens of Amastra nigra.

The spire has straight outlines, though the absence of the first whorl suggests it may originally have been slightly concave. The early whorls are flesh-colored, transitioning to very pale brown on the last two whorls, which are covered by a thin, light, slightly yellowish-brown cuticle. This cuticle is worn away near the aperture, revealing a chestnut coloration close to the outer lip.

The aperture is structured similarly to that of Amastra pellucida or A. nigra. The columellar lamella is subhorizontal, with a deep and short curve beneath it. A rather strong but narrow rib is present within the outer lip.

== Distribution ==
This species is endemic to Hawaii, occurring on Lanai island.
