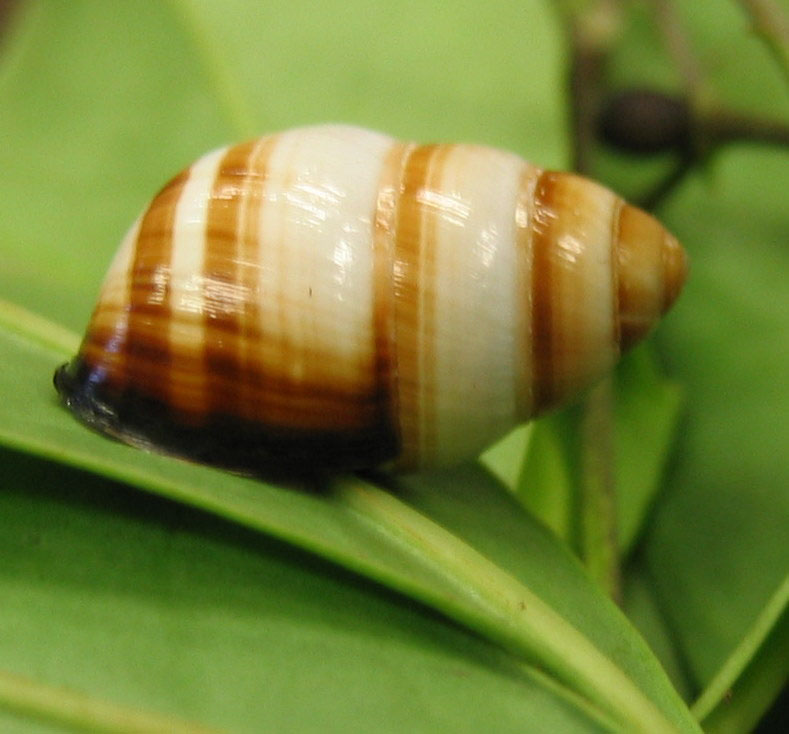

Conservation status
- Critically Endangered (IUCN 2.3)

- Critically Imperiled (NatureServe)
- CITES Appendix I

Scientific classification
- Kingdom: Animalia
- Phylum: Mollusca
- Class: Gastropoda
- Order: Stylommatophora
- Family: Achatinellidae
- Genus: Achatinella
- Species: A. bulimoides

Binomial name
- Achatinella bulimoides Swainson, 1828

Synonyms
- Achatinella (Bulimella) bulimoides Swainson, 1828 alternative representation; Achatinella (Bulimella) bulimoides bulimoides Swainson, 1828 alternative representation; Achatinella elegans Newcomb, 1854 superseded combination

= Achatinella bulimoides =

Species of gastropod

Achatinella bulimoides is a rare species of air-breathing land snail, a terrestrial pulmonate gastropod mollusk in the family Achatinellidae.

== Subspecies ==
- Achatinella bulimoides albalabia Welch, 1954
- Achatinella bulimoides arnemani Welch, 1958
- Achatinella bulimoides bulimoides Swainson, 1828
- Achatinella bulimoides caesiapicta Welch, 1954
- Achatinella bulimoides circulospadix Welch, 1954
- Achatinella bulimoides elegans Newcomb, 1854
- Achatinella bulimoides fricki L. Pfeiffer, 1855
- Achatinella bulimoides fulvula Welch, 1954
- Achatinella bulimoides glabra Newcomb, 1854
- Achatinella bulimoides kaipapauensis Welch, 1958
- Achatinella bulimoides kalekukei Welch, 1954
- Achatinella bulimoides mistura Pilsbry & C. M. Cooke, 1913
- Achatinella bulimoides obliqua Gulick, 1858
- Achatinella bulimoides oswaldi Welch, 1958
- Achatinella bulimoides ovata Newcomb, 1853
- Achatinella bulimoides papakokoensis Welch, 1958
- Achatinella bulimoides rosea Swainson, 1828
- Achatinella bulimoides rosealimbata Welch, 1954
- Achatinella bulimoides rotunda Gulick, 1858
- Achatinella bulimoides rufapicta Welch, 1958
- Achatinella bulimoides spadicea Gulick, 1858
- Achatinella bulimoides vidua L. Pfeiffer, 1855
- Achatinella bulimoides wheatleyana Pilsbry & C. M. Cooke, 1913

== Distribution ==
This species is endemic to Oahu, Hawaii. It is now extinct in the wild.

== Conservation status ==
All members of the genus Achatinella are extremely rare in the wild. Achatinella bulimoides is a special case, as it is so rare it is now believed to be extinct in the wild. The last known wild specimens were removed from the wild in 2019.

As of 2024, there are 290 specimens in the captive breeding program.

== Shell description ==
The dextral or sinistral shell is ovate-oblong and subventricose. The shell has 6 1/4 whorls. The shell is similar in form to Achatinella livida, but the spire is less thickened and more pointed at the apex. The color is whitish with chestnut bands, and the apex is pale brown. The ground-color, in some specimens, is pale chestnut or ferruginous, banded with darker shades. Other specimens are pure white. The aperture is white. The suture is scarcely if at all margined by a groove.

The height of the shell is 21.3 millimetres (0.84 in). The width of the shell is 11.8 millimetres (0.46 in).

== Achatinella rosea ==
Achatinella rosea Swainson, 1828 is a subspecies of Achatinella bulimoides. Its sinistral shell is a pale, rose color, with two obsolete white bands. The shell has 6 1/3 whorls. The margin of the lip and columella are of a deeper rose-color, and the aperture white. It should be observed that the subsutural groove is very distinct. The height of the shell is 22.3 millimetres (0.88 in). The width of the shell is 13.5 millimetres (0.53 in).
