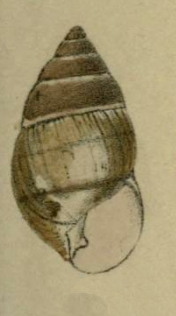
- Shell of Amastra pusilla

Scientific classification
- Kingdom: Animalia
- Phylum: Mollusca
- Class: Gastropoda
- Order: Stylommatophora
- Family: Amastridae
- Genus: Amastra
- Species: A. pusilla

Binomial name
- Amastra pusilla (Newcomb, 1855)

Synonyms
- Achatinella pusilla Newcomb, 1855 superseded combination; Achatinella pusilla L. Pfeiffer, 1856 junior subjective synonym; Amastra (Amastra) pusilla (Newcomb, 1855) alternative representation

= Amastra pusilla =

Species of mollusc

Amastra pusilla is a species of air-breathing land snail, a terrestrial pulmonate gastropod mollusc in the family Amastridae.

== Description ==
The length of the shell attains 11.6 mm, its diameter 5.1 mm

The shell is dextral, conically ovate, with an acute apex. It consists of 6 whorls, which are plano-convex in shape. The suture is lightly impressed above and more strongly marked below. The outer lip is simple, and the columella is short with a twisted plait. The epidermis is light brown, often adorned with narrow white bands encircling the shell.

Amastra pusilla is the smallest species of Amastra from Lanai. While it bears some resemblance to Amastra petricola from Molokai, it differs notably in the sculpture of the embryonic whorls.

The spire outlines are convex near the base and slightly concave near the apex. The first half-whorl is smooth, followed by a flattened whorl with strong, widely spaced ribs and a carina just above the suture. The ribs become finer and closer on the next whorl, persisting near the upper part but fading below. The embryonic shell consists of 2½ whorls. The subsequent whorls exhibit only growth-wrinkles.

The penultimate whorl is typically brown, with cream-white bands bordering the sutures above and below. The body whorl may feature creamy bands at the suture, periphery, and base, or in some cases, several bands are present above the periphery. In other specimens, the last two whorls are opaque cream with several spiral brown bands. A thin yellowish cuticle, partially deciduous, covers the final whorls. The aperture is white within, with a pronounced lip-rib . The columellar lamella is subhorizontal.

== Distribution ==
This species is endemic to Hawaii, occurring on Lanai island.
