= Pseudophilautus leucorhinus =

Conservation status
- Extinct (IUCN 3.1)

Scientific classification
- Kingdom: Animalia
- Phylum: Chordata
- Class: Amphibia
- Order: Anura
- Family: Rhacophoridae
- Genus: Pseudophilautus
- Species: †P. leucorhinus

Binomial name
- †Pseudophilautus leucorhinus (Lichtenstein and Martens, 1856)

Synonyms
- Ixalus leucorhinus Lichtenstein and Martens, 1856; Rhacophorus leucorhinus (Lichtenstein and Martens, 1856); Philautus leucorhinus (Lichtenstein and Martens, 1856)

Extinct species of frog

Pseudophilautus leucorhinus, also known as white-nosed shrub frog, pointed-nosed shrub frog, whitenose bubble-nest frog, and Marten's bush frog, was a species of frog in the family Rhacophoridae. It was endemic to Sri Lanka. It is only known from the holotype that was collected some time before 1856 from the indefinite type locality "Ceylon". Pseudophilautus wynaadensis from southwestern India has been considered conspecific with this species, but these species are now considered distinct.

== Description ==
The holotype measures 20 mm (0.8 in) in snout–vent length. The body is elongate. The head is dorsally flat. The tympanum is not visible and the supratympanic fold is weakly defined. The toes are partially webbed. The alcohol-preserved specimen is dorsally pale brownish-yellow. There is a darker brown interorbital bar. The upper lip is pale pale brownish-yellow. The flanks and sides of the head are dark brown, with the lower flank and inguinal zone being pale brownish-yellow. The limbs have dark-brown crossbars. The lower parts of the body are pale brown-yellow.

== Habitat and conservation ==
The former habitat of this species is unknown. It probably had direct development (i.e., there is no free-living larval stage). The factors leading to its extinction are unknown but probably involved habitat loss.
