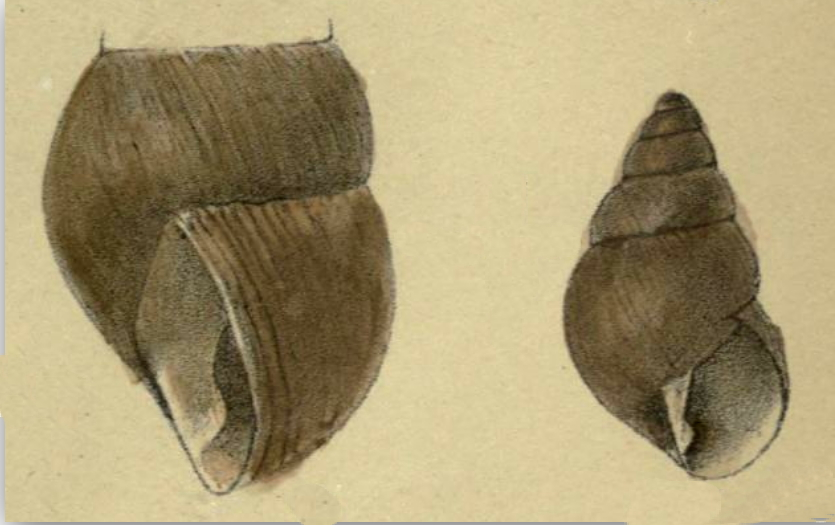
- Shell of Amastra umbilicata

Conservation status
- Extinct (IUCN 2.3)

- Presumed Extinct (NatureServe)

Scientific classification
- Kingdom: Animalia
- Phylum: Mollusca
- Class: Gastropoda
- Order: Stylommatophora
- Family: Amastridae
- Genus: Amastra
- Species: †A. umbilicata

Binomial name
- †Amastra umbilicata (L. Pfeiffer, 1856)

Synonyms
- Achatinella (Laminella) umbilicata L. Pfeiffer, 1856 superseded combination; Achatinella umbilicata L. Pfeiffer, 1856 superseded combination; Amastra (Cyclamastra) umbilicata (L. Pfeiffer, 1856) alternative representation

= Amastra umbilicata =

Species of gastropod

Amastra umbilicata was a species of air-breathing land snail, a terrestrial pulmonate gastropod mollusc in the family Amastridae.

Subspecies

- † Amastra umbilicata arenarum Pilsbry & C. M. Cooke, 1914
- Amastra umbilicata pluscula C. M. Cooke, 1917
- Amastra umbilicata umbilicata (L. Pfeiffer, 1856)

== Description ==
The length of the shell attains 10.5 mm, its diameter 5.7 mm.

The shell is very narrowly but openly umbilicate, dextral, ovate-conic, thin, and striate, with an opaque brown coloration. The spire is slightly concavely conic, terminating in an acute apex.

There are 6 whorls, which are only slightly convex. The body whorl is somewhat shorter than the spire and angular at the base. The aperture is elliptical, with sharp angles at both ends. The columellar fold is compressed, deep, and subtransverse.

The peristome is simple and acute, with the columellar margin slightly dilated and entirely free throughout, adding to the shell's delicate and refined appearance.

This species differs from Amastra petricola in several key features: it has a larger umbilicus, a thinner, unicolored shell, a more slender spire, and a smaller, more oblique columellar fold. Unlike A. petricola, the specimens examined show no sign of thickening within the outer lip, suggesting the two species are not closely related.

The shell color is a rather light brown, becoming darker at the apex. The whorls in the protoconch may be striate when fresh and unworn, but they appear smooth in the specimens available. The whorls are more convex compared to A. petricola.

The umbilicus, when viewed from the base, is circular, deep, and moderately broad, partially overhung by the columellar lip. It is bounded by an obtuse ridge that is accentuated by a shallow spiral excavation near its edge. The aperture is angular where the columellar and basal margins meet. The columellar margin is triangularly dilated and bears a small, highly oblique fold, which emerges more prominently than that of A. petricola, extending nearly to the edge.

Faint traces of a thin, brown outer cuticle are present on the shell surface.

== Distribution ==
This species was endemic to Hawaii and occurred on Oahu Island.
