= Pseudophilautus eximius =

Conservation status
- Extinct (IUCN 3.1)

Scientific classification
- Kingdom: Animalia
- Phylum: Chordata
- Class: Amphibia
- Order: Anura
- Family: Rhacophoridae
- Genus: Pseudophilautus
- Species: †P. eximius

Binomial name
- †Pseudophilautus eximius (Shreve, 1940)

Synonyms
- Philautus eximius Shreve, 1940

Extinct species of amphibian

Pseudophilautus eximius is an extinct species of frog in the family Rhacophoridae. It was endemic to Sri Lanka. It is only known from the holotype collected in 1933.

== Description ==
The holotype is an adult female measuring 35 mm (1.4 in) in snout–vent length. The body is stout with a flat head. The snout is bluntly angled dorsally and rounded in profile. No tympanum is visible, but the supratympanic fold is distinct. The canthal edges are sharp. Skin is smooth except for the granular chest and belly. The fingers have dermal fringes whereas the toes are medially webbed. The upper parts of the alcohol-preserved specimen are yellowish light-brown with dark-brown markings. The underside is pale yellow.

This species resembles Pseudophilautus variabilis.

== Distribution and conservation ==
The holotype was collected in 1933 from "Queenwood Estate, Dimbulla, Ceylon" at 1,500 m (4,900 ft) above sea level. No other specimens are known, despite extensive field surveys, also at the type locality. The habitat requirements of this species are unknown. The reasons for its demise are also unknown, but probably involve habitat loss.

Pseudophilautus eximius is only known from Queenwood Estate, Dimbulla.
