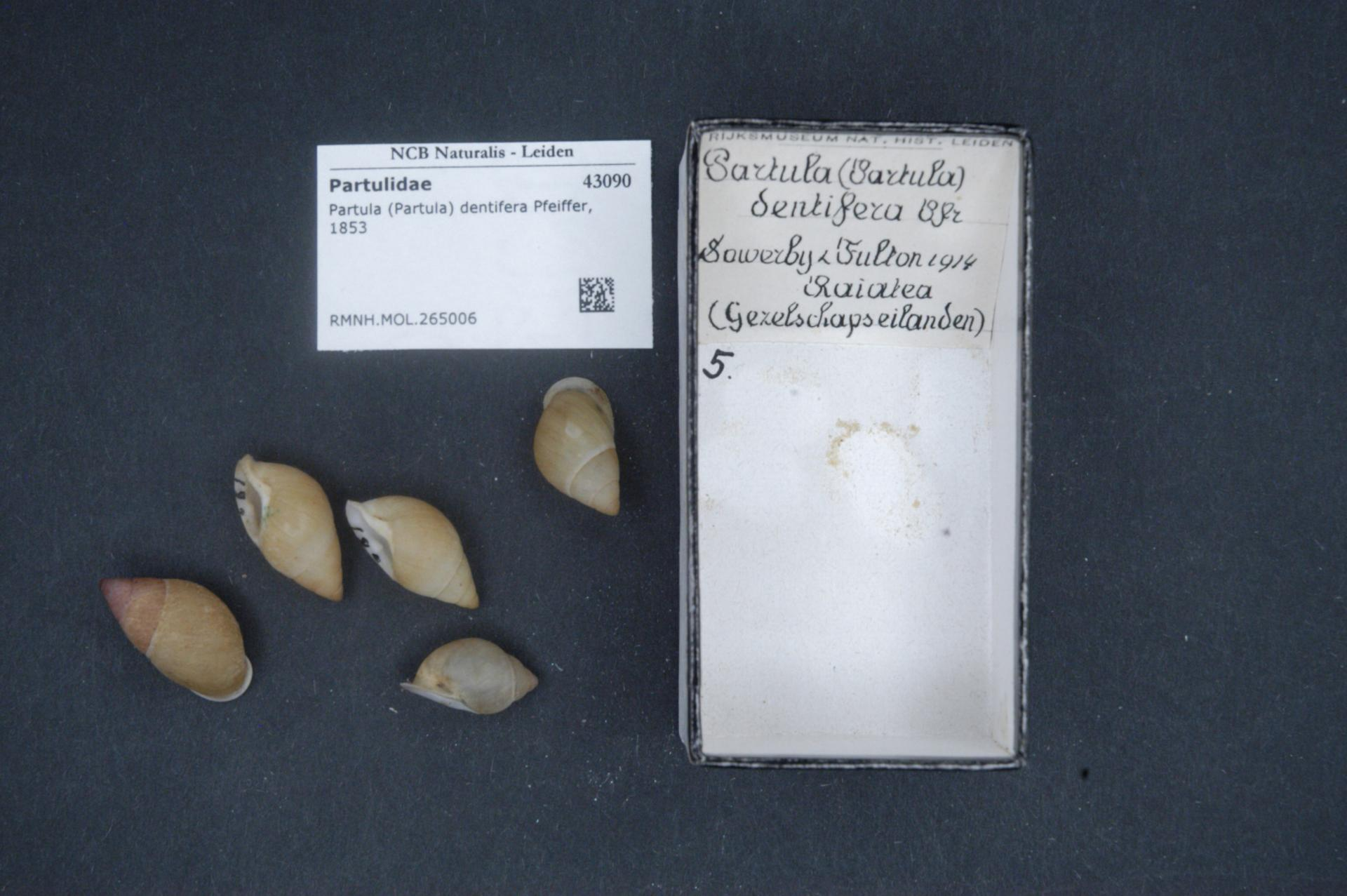

Conservation status
- Extinct (IUCN 3.1)

Scientific classification
- Kingdom: Animalia
- Phylum: Mollusca
- Class: Gastropoda
- Order: Stylommatophora
- Family: Partulidae
- Genus: Partula
- Species: †P. dentifera

Binomial name
- †Partula dentifera Pfeiffer, 1852

Synonyms
- List: Partula callifera L. Pfeiffer, 1857; Partula candida H. E. Crampton, 1956; Partula cedista H. E. Crampton, 1956; Partula citrina Pease, 1866; Partula formosa Garrett, 1884; Partula imperforata Garrett, 1884

= Partula dentifera =

Extinct species of gastropod

Partula dentifera is an extinct species of air-breathing tropical land snail, a terrestrial pulmonate gastropod mollusk in the family Partulidae. This species was endemic to the Raiatea in the Society Islands of French Polynesia, where the last live individual was seen in 1972. It was officially declared extinct by the International Union for Conservation of Nature in June 2024.

Like many other snails of the Society Islands, its extinction can be attributed to the introduction of the rosy wolfsnail (Euglandina rosea)

== Extinction ==
P. dentifera was last seen alive in 1972. Further surveys conducted in 1991 failed to record live individuals, but empty shells belonging to the species were found. Its extinction is attributed to the introduction of the rosy wolfsnail (Euglandina rosea), which was introduced to the island in the late 1980s.

Living individuals previously thought to be Partula dentifera were collected in 1992 and bred in captivity, however, these were later found to be P. navigatoria.

The species was officially declared extinct on the 27th of June, 2024 in the IUCN Red Lists 2024-1 update.
