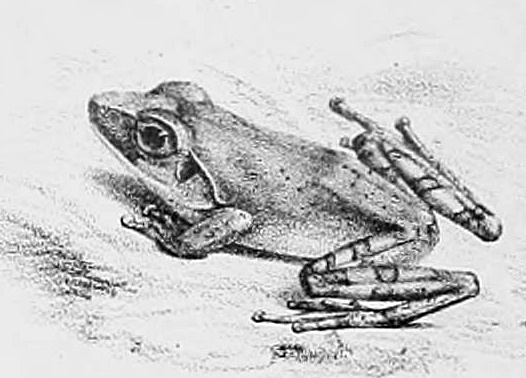

Conservation status
- Extinct (yes) (IUCN 3.1)

Scientific classification
- Kingdom: Animalia
- Phylum: Chordata
- Class: Amphibia
- Order: Anura
- Family: Rhacophoridae
- Genus: Pseudophilautus
- Species: †P. temporalis

Binomial name
- †Pseudophilautus temporalis (Günther, 1864)

Synonyms
- Ixalus temporalis Günther, 1864; Rhacophorus temporalis (Günther, 1864); Philautus temporalis (Günther, 1864)

= Pseudophilautus temporalis =

Extinct species of amphibian

Pseudophilautus temporalis is an extinct species of frog in the family Rhacophoridae. It was endemic to Sri Lanka.

== Taxonomy ==
Pseudophilautus temporalis was originally known as Ixalus temporalis when it was first described. It was later renamed to Philautus temporalis in 1985, before being renamed again to Pseudophilautus temporalis.

== Habitat and distribution ==
Pseudophilatus temporalis was only known to occur in Sri Lanka, though its exact distribution and habitat are unknown. Originally, it was believed that their range extended to the Western Ghats in India due to specimens thought to be Pseudophilautus temporalis being found there. It was later determined that these specimens were actually Pseudophilautus wynaadensis and Pseudophilautus temporalis is considered endemic to Sri Lanka.

== History ==
The species is only known from the lectotype and type series. They were purchased and described by German herpetologist Albert Günther in "Ceylon" (Sri Lanka) in 1864. Recent surveys of Sri Lanka and its amphibians have failed to locate Pseudophilautus temporalis since it was first discovered. It was listed as Extinct on the IUCN Red List in 2004. The exact cause of its extinction is unknown, but habitat loss is presumed to have been a factor.
