= Pseudophilautus zal =

Conservation status
- Extinct (IUCN 3.1)

Scientific classification
- Kingdom: Animalia
- Phylum: Chordata
- Class: Amphibia
- Order: Anura
- Family: Rhacophoridae
- Genus: Pseudophilautus
- Species: †P. zal

Binomial name
- †Pseudophilautus zal (Manamendra-Arachchi and Pethiyagoda, 2005)

Synonyms
- Philautus zal Manamendra-Arachchi and Pethiyagoda, 2005

Extinct species of amphibian

Pseudophilautus zal, commonly known as the white blotched shrub frog, is an extinct species of frog in the family Rhacophoridae. It was endemic to Sri Lanka. It is only known from the type series consisting of three old museum specimens.

== Etymology ==
The specific name zal is a Polish word that, according to Arthur Rubinstein, refers to "sadness, nostalgia, regret, burning hurt, and yet something else". This name was chosen by the authors of the species to express their "sadness and frustration at the loss of this and so many other endemic amphibians in Sri Lanka".

== Description ==
The type series consists of three adult males measuring 25.0–25.4 mm (0.98–1.00 in) in snout–vent length. The body is stout. The snout is bluntly angled dorsally and rounded in profile. The tympanum is visible and the supratympanic fold is prominent. The canthal edges are sharp. Skin is shagreened to granular. The fingers have dermal fringes whereas the toes are medially webbed. The upper parts of the alcohol-preserved specimens are light brown with dark-brown blotches and about five white spots. The underside is pale yellow.

The holotype was originally identified as Ixalus minutus, an unpublished name. One of the paratypes is a former syntype of Pseudophilautus variabilis, and the other was a syntype of Pseudophilautus microtympanum.

== Distribution and conservation ==
The types are only known to have been collected from "Ceylon", a rather general location. All were identified as different species, suggesting that Pseudophilautus zal might have had a wide distribution. No other specimens are known, despite extensive field surveys in more recent times. The habitat requirements of this species are unknown. The reasons for its demise are also unknown, but probably involved habitat loss.
