= Taipidon =

Scientific classification
- Kingdom: Animalia
- Phylum: Mollusca
- Class: Gastropoda
- Order: Stylommatophora
- Family: Endodontidae
- Genus: †Taipidon; Solem, 1976

Genus of gastropods

Taipidon is a genus of small air-breathing land snails, terrestrial pulmonate gastropod molluscs in the family Endodontidae.

== Species ==
Species within the genus Taipidon include:

- Taipidon anceyana
- Taipidon marquesana
- Taipidon octolamellata
