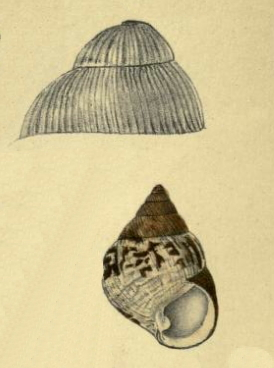
- Shell of Amastra nigra

Scientific classification
- Kingdom: Animalia
- Phylum: Mollusca
- Class: Gastropoda
- Order: Stylommatophora
- Family: Amastridae
- Genus: Amastra
- Species: A. nigra

Binomial name
- Amastra nigra (Newcomb, 1855)

Synonyms
- Achatinella nigra Newcomb, 1855 superseded combination; Achatinella nigra L. Pfeiffer, 1856 junior subjective synonym; Amastra (Amastra) nigra (Newcomb, 1855) alternative representation

= Amastra nigra =

Species of mollusc

Amastra nigra is a species of air-breathing land snail, a terrestrial pulmonate gastropod mollusc in the family Amastridae.

Subspecies

- Amastra humilis moomomiensis Pilsbry & C. M. Cooke, 1914
- Amastra humilis sepulta Pilsbry & C. M. Cooke, 1914

== Description ==
The length of the shell attains 17 mm, its diameter 11.2 mm

The dextral shell is globosely acuminate, moderately solid, and composed of 6 whorls. The two lower whorls are prominently inflated, contrasting with the subulate superior whorls. The last two whorls display a rugged surface, characterized by coarse longitudinal striae intersected by irregularly spaced, revolving ridges that form rough cicatrices. The upper whorls are flattened and densely marked with pronounced longitudinal striae. The suture is simple, distinct, and well-impressed.

The aperture is roundly ovate, with a short columella ending in a well-defined lamellar tooth. The shell is a yellowish-white hue, coated with a delicate black epidermis.

The second embryonic whorl is nearly flat-sided, featuring a sculpture of strong, curved riblets and a prominent carina above the suture. The following whorl displays fine ribbing, which is partially effaced at its center. The final, highly globose whorl is distinctly malleated, characterized by flattened facets and irregular, descending spiral ridges.

The spire is brown, while the body whorl, beneath its dull, blackish cuticle, is almost white. The cuticle is irregularly adorned with angular streaks on the spire. The outer lip is reinforced by a prominent rib or a delicate callus on the inner surface.

== Distribution ==
This species is endemic to Hawaii, occurring on Maui island.
