= Panulena perrugosa =

Conservation status
- Extinct (IUCN 2.3)

Scientific classification
- Kingdom: Animalia
- Phylum: Mollusca
- Class: Gastropoda
- Order: Stylommatophora
- Family: Helicarionidae
- Genus: Panulena
- Species: †P. perrugosa

Binomial name
- †Panulena perrugosa Iredale, 1945

Species of gastropod

Panulena perrugosa was a species of air-breathing land snail or semislug, a terrestrial pulmonate gastropod mollusk in the family Helicarionidae. This species was endemic to Norfolk Island. It was first identified and named in 1945 by Tom Iredale; it was extinct by 1996.
