= Atelopus vogli =

Conservation status
- Extinct (1959) (IUCN 3.1)

Scientific classification
- Kingdom: Animalia
- Phylum: Chordata
- Class: Amphibia
- Order: Anura
- Family: Bufonidae
- Genus: Atelopus
- Species: †A. vogli

Binomial name
- †Atelopus vogli Müller, 1934

Synonyms
- Atelopus cruciger vogli Müller, 1934

Extinct species of amphibian

The maracay harlequin frog or Vogli stubfoot toad (Atelopus vogli) is an extinct species of harlequin frog in the family Bufonidae. It was endemic to Venezuela. It is known from collections in two localities: its type locality, Las Peñas near Hacienda la Trinidad in Aragua, and Montalbán in Carabobo. It was first described as subspecies of Atelopus cruciger. The specific name vogli honours Cornelius Vogl, German priest who was a missionary in Venezuela in 1925–1959. Common name Vogl's harlequin toad has been coined for it.

== Description ==
Adult males measure 21–29 mm (0.83–1.14 in) and adult females 33–39 mm (1.3–1.5 in) in snout–vent length. The snout is pointed in dorsal view. No tympanum is visible, but the supratympanic crest is well developed. There are small rounded warts present on the dorsolateral surfaces, most prominently around the arm insertions and as a dorsolateral row. The fingers have some basal webbing while the toes are slightly more webbed. The hind limbs are relatively long. Preserved specimens have uniform tan color (coloration in life unknown).

Two known former populations of Atelopus vogli on the southern slopes of the Venezuelan Coastal Range.

== Habitat and conservation ==
The maracay harlequin frog was last seen in 1959 and it was declared extinct in 2005. The type locality was a semi-deciduous humid forest at about 600–700 m (2,000–2,300 ft) above sea level. The Montalbán population lived at similar elevation; both localities are on the southern slopes of the Venezuelan Coastal Range. The species was apparently very abundant at the type locality as in excess of 400 specimens were collected in 1933. The other locality is represented by a single specimen collected in 1957 and found to represent this species in 2009. These are the latest known sightings of this species now believed to be extinct. In the case of the type locality, the cause of extirpation was likely total habitat modification caused by human activities.
