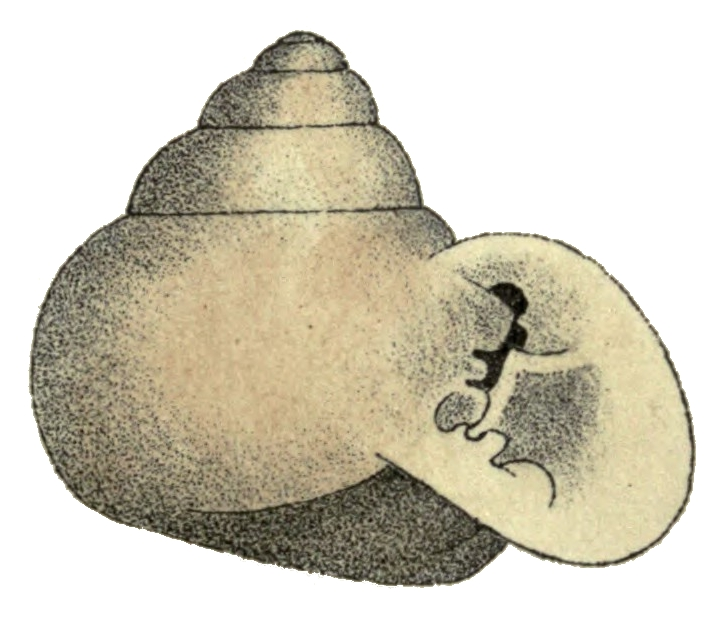
- A drawing of a shell of Tomigerus turbinatus

Conservation status
- Extinct (IUCN 3.1)

Scientific classification
- Kingdom: Animalia
- Phylum: Mollusca
- Class: Gastropoda
- Order: Stylommatophora
- Family: Tomogeridae
- Genus: †Biotocus
- Species: †B. turbinatus

Binomial name
- †Biotocus turbinatus (Pfeiffer, 1845)

Synonyms
- Helix tomigeroides S. Moricand, 1846 · unaccepted (junior synonym); Tornigenus turbinatus ssp. biolocus Pfeiffer, 1845; Tomigerus turbinatus

= Biotocus turbinatus =

Extinct species of gastropods

Biotocus turbinatus is an extinct species of land snail, a gastropod in the family Tomogeridae.

== Description ==
The altitude of the shell reaches 10 mm (0.39 in), and its maximum diameter reaches 11 mm (0.43 in).

(Original description in Latin) The shell is chinked, compresssed-turbinate (like a flattened top), thin, and very lightly striated. It's pale horny in color and slightly shiny.

The spire is turbinate (top-shaped) and somewhat sharp. There are 5 convex whorls, with the body whorl barely equaling the spire in height. This body whorl is compressed on the side, slightly angled at the base, and ascends anteriorly, where it is constricted and pitted underneath.

The aperture is vertical, somewhat ear-shaped, and nearly closed. The peristome is widely expanded, thin, and its right margin is arched. It is armed on the inside with a strong, upper bifid (two-pronged) lamella. The basal lamella descends obliquely and is tridentate (three-toothed). The apertural wall shows 3 unequal lamellae.

== Distribution ==
This species was endemic to Brazil and is since 1996 considered extinct.
