= Pseudophilautus extirpo =

Conservation status
- Extinct (IUCN 3.1)

Scientific classification
- Kingdom: Animalia
- Phylum: Chordata
- Class: Amphibia
- Order: Anura
- Family: Rhacophoridae
- Genus: Pseudophilautus
- Species: †P. extirpo

Binomial name
- †Pseudophilautus extirpo (Manamendra-Arachchi and Pethiyagoda, 2005)

Synonyms
- Philautus extirpo Manamendra-Arachchi and Pethiyagoda, 2005

Extinct species of amphibian

Pseudophilautus extirpo, known as blunt-snouted shrub frog, is an extinct species of frog in the family Rhacophoridae. It was endemic to Sri Lanka. It is only known from the holotype collected in 1882 (or before). The specific name extirpo is Latin meaning "destroy" or "eradicate" and refers to the apparent extinction of this species.

== Description ==
The holotype is an adult female measuring 43.5 mm (1.71 in) in snout–vent length. The body is stout and the head is flat. The snout is angled in dorsal view and blunt in profile. No tympanum is visible, but the supratympanic fold is prominent. The canthal edges are sharp. The dorsum is shagreened and has a few glandular warts. The sides are granular. The fingers have poorly defined dermal fringes whereas the toes are medially webbed. The upper parts of the alcohol-preserved specimen are light and dark brown with white patches; the flanks are dark brown and have white patches too. The underside is dark brown with light brown patches.

== Distribution and conservation ==
The holotype is only known to have been collected from "Ceylon" no later than 1882. No other specimens are known, despite extensive field surveys in more recent times. The habitat requirements of this species are unknown. The reasons for its demise are also unknown, but probably involved habitat loss.
