= Oleacina guadeloupensis =

Conservation status
- Extinct (IUCN 2.3)

Scientific classification
- Kingdom: Animalia
- Phylum: Mollusca
- Class: Gastropoda
- Order: Stylommatophora
- Family: Oleacinidae
- Genus: Oleacina
- Species: †O. guadeloupensis

Binomial name
- †Oleacina guadeloupensis Pfeiffer, 1856

Species of gastropod

Oleacina guadeloupensis was a species of air-breathing land snail, a terrestrial pulmonate gastropod mollusk in the family Oleacinidae. It is now extinct.

== Distribution ==
This species was endemic to the island of Guadeloupe in the West Indies.
