= Melicope obovata =

Conservation status
- Extinct (IUCN 2.3)

Scientific classification
- Kingdom: Plantae
- Clade: Tracheophytes
- Clade: Angiosperms
- Clade: Eudicots
- Clade: Rosids
- Order: Sapindales
- Family: Rutaceae
- Genus: Melicope
- Species: †M. obovata

Binomial name
- †Melicope obovata (H.St.John) T.G.Hartley & B.C.Stone

Synonyms
- Pelea obovata H.St.John

Extinct species of flowering plant

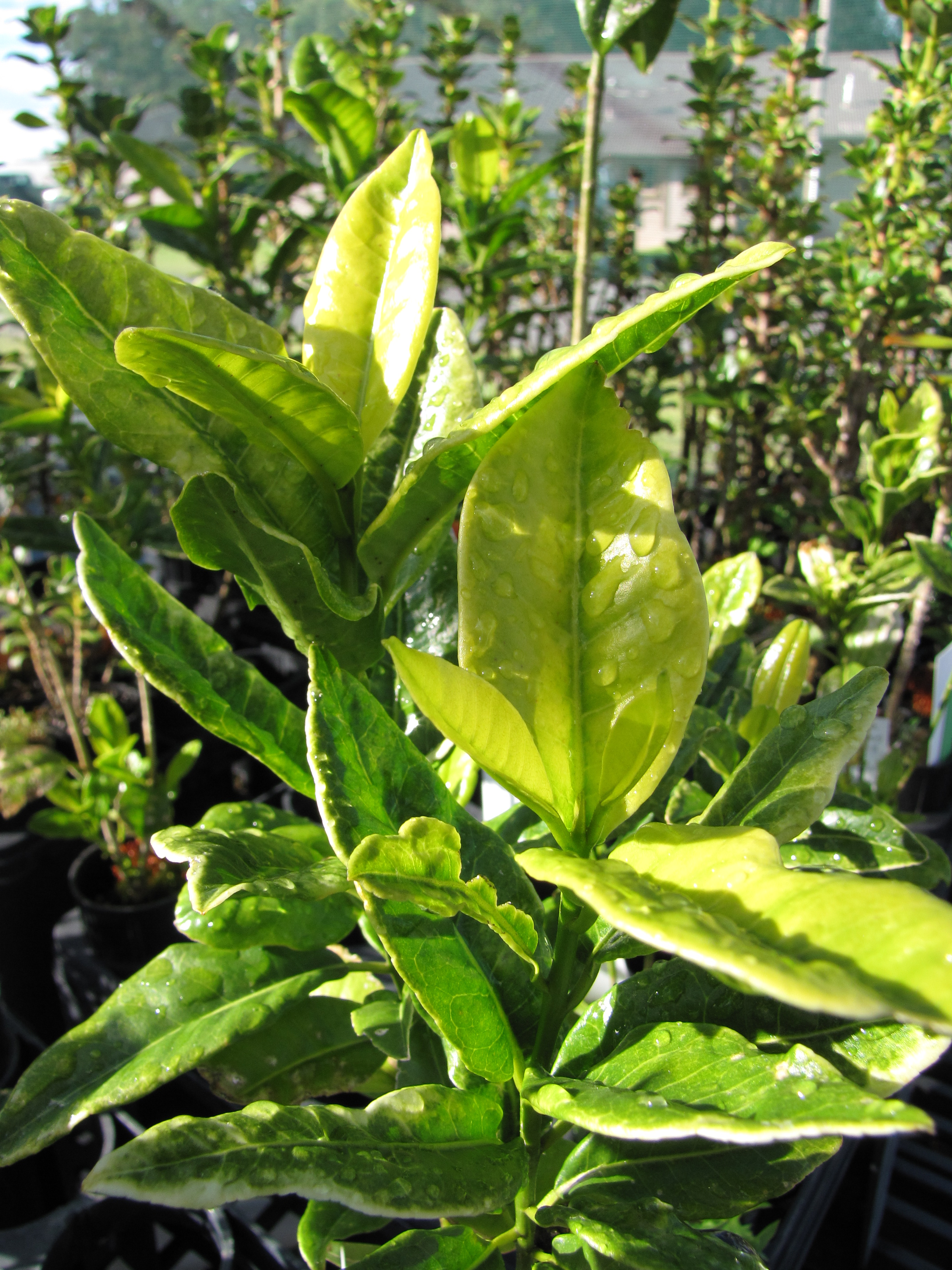
Melicope obovata habit at Greenhouse Haleakala National Park Maui

Melicope obovata, also called Makawao melicope or ovate melicope, was a species of plant in the family Rutaceae. It was endemic to the Hawaiian Islands.
