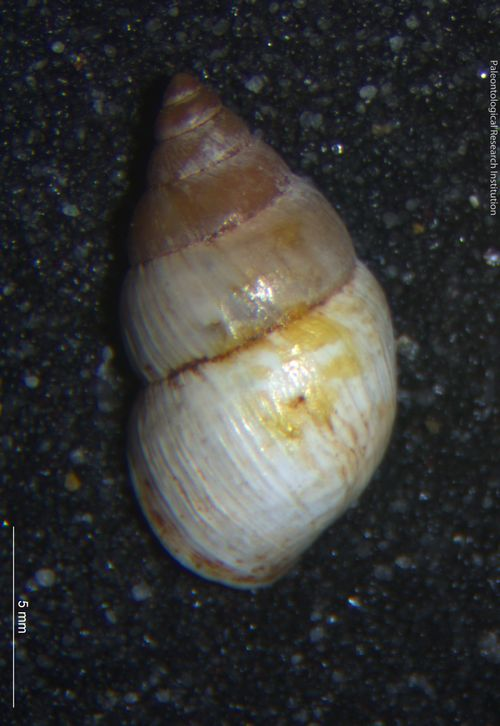

Conservation status
- Extinct (IUCN 2.3)

- Possibly Extinct (NatureServe)

Scientific classification
- Kingdom: Animalia
- Phylum: Mollusca
- Class: Gastropoda
- Order: Stylommatophora
- Family: Amastridae
- Genus: Amastra
- Species: †A. crassilabrum

Binomial name
- †Amastra crassilabrum Newcomb, 1854
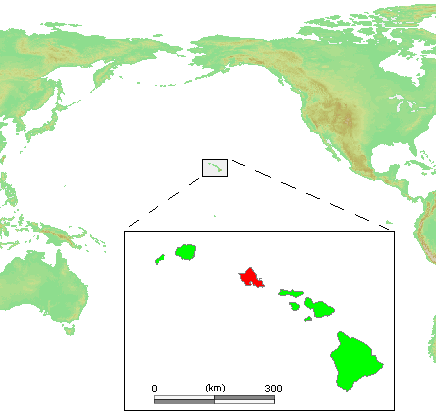
- Location of Oʻahu

Synonyms
- Achatinella crassilabrum Newcomb, 1854 superseded combination; Amastra (Metamastra) crassilabrum (Newcomb, 1854) alternative representation

= Amastra crassilabrum =

Species of gastropod

Amastra crassilabrum is an extinct species of air-breathing land snail, a terrestrial pulmonate gastropod mollusks in the family Amastridae.

== Description ==
(Original description) The shell is conically ovate, pointed at the apex, and ventricose toward the base, with a rather solid structure. It consists of six rounded whorls and features an ovate aperture. The outer lip is significantly thickened internally, while the short columella terminates in a prominent oblique plait. The surface is marked by strong longitudinal striations, with the body whorl often bearing cicatrices.

The body whorl is yellowish-white, contrasting with the dark brown or black coloration of the upper whorls.

== Distribution ==
This species was endemic to Oʻahu, and was known from the Waiʻanae Range.
