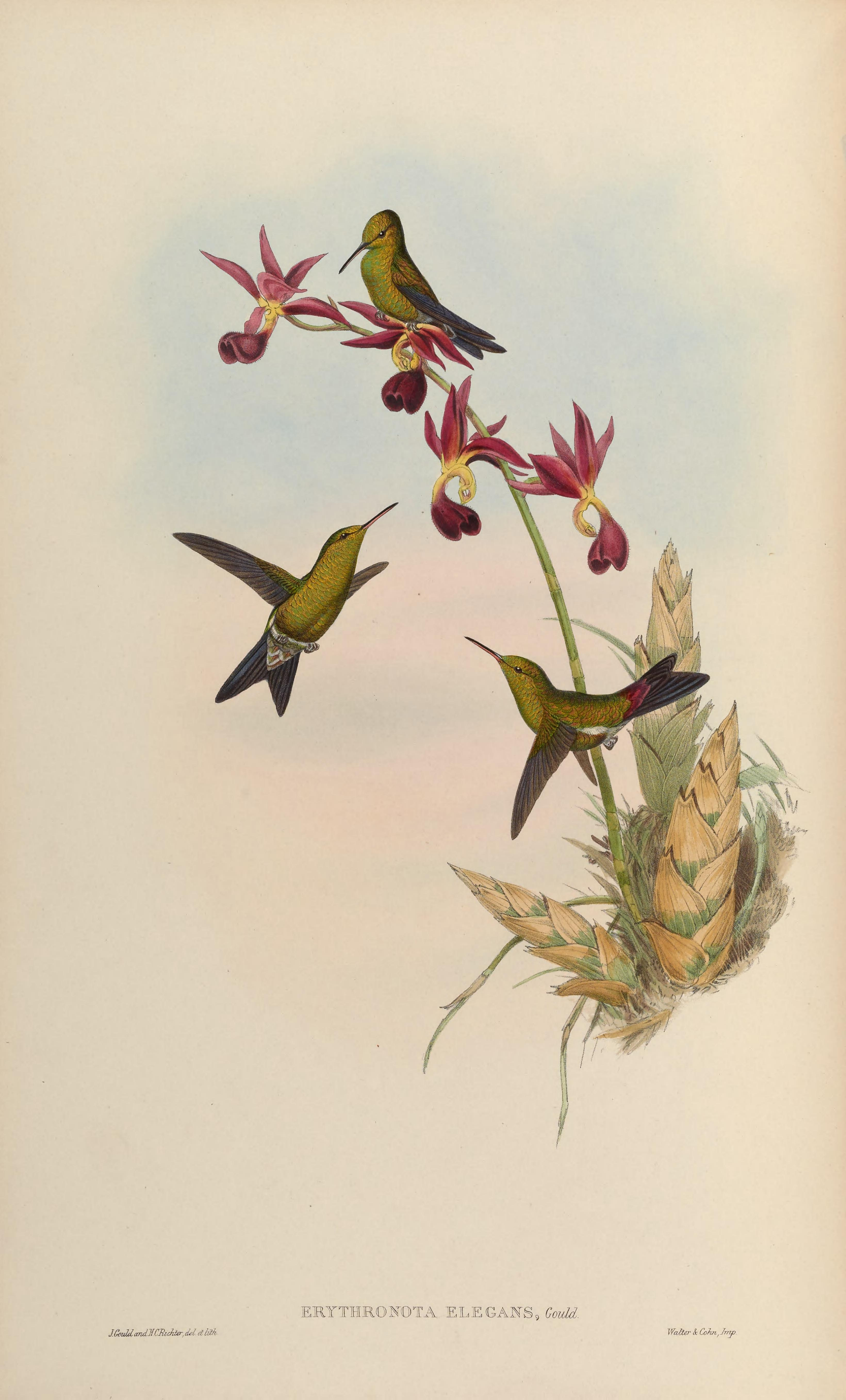

Conservation status
- Extinct (1860) (IUCN 3.1)

Scientific classification
- Kingdom: Animalia
- Phylum: Chordata
- Class: Aves
- Order: Apodiformes
- Family: Trochilidae
- Genus: Riccordia
- Species: †R. elegans

Binomial name
- †Riccordia elegans (Gould, 1860)

Synonyms
- Chlorostilbon elegans (Gould, 1860); Erythronota elegans Gould, 1860

= Gould's emerald =

Species of hummingbird

Gould's emerald (Riccordia elegans) or the Caribbean emerald is an extinct species of hummingbird in the family Trochilidae. It was described based on a single specimen taken in 1860; it is of unknown origin, but the northern Bahamas or especially Jamaica are likely sources.

In 2023 the International Ornithological Committee deleted it from its species list "until, and if, genetic analysis and/or stable isotope analysis sheds further light on its status."

== Extinction ==
Except for the type specimen, there are no records, and it is presumed extinct. While there is no information about the exact cause of extinction, the likely reasons include the loss of habitat or required food plants, and predation by introduced mammals. The holotype is currently located in Natural History Museum at Tring.
