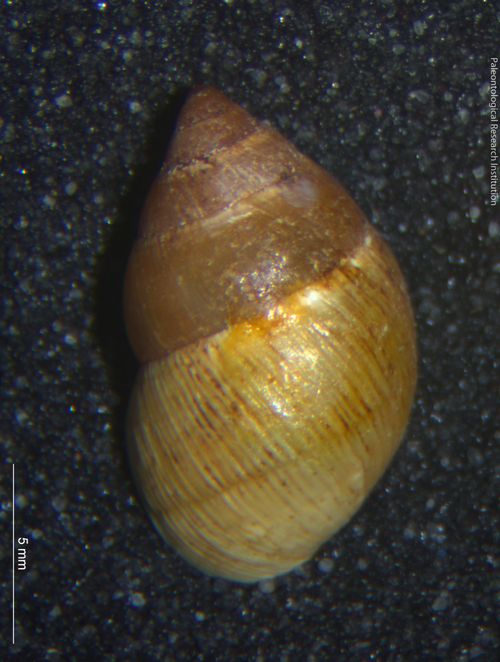

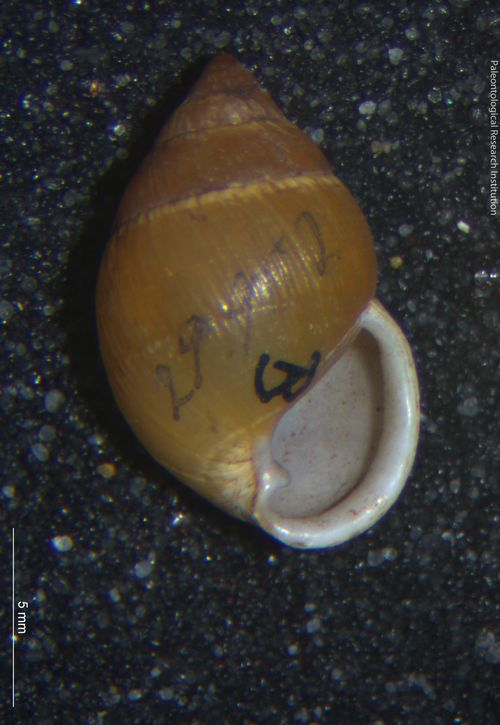
- Syntype of Amastra albolabris

Conservation status
- Extinct (IUCN 2.3)

- Possibly Extinct (NatureServe)

Scientific classification
- Kingdom: Animalia
- Phylum: Mollusca
- Class: Gastropoda
- Order: Stylommatophora
- Family: Amastridae
- Genus: Amastra
- Species: †A. albolabris

Binomial name
- †Amastra albolabris (Newcomb, 1854)
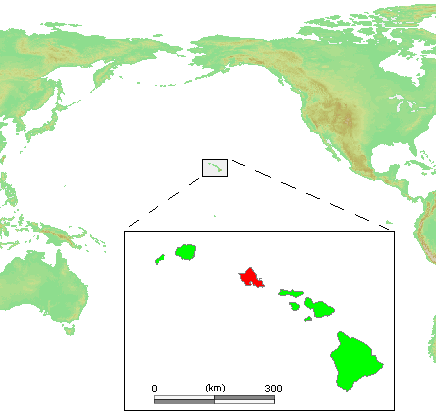
- Location of Oʻahu

Synonyms
- Achatinella albolabris Newcomb, 1854 superseded combination; Amastra (Metamastra) albolabris (Newcomb, 1854) alternative representation

= Amastra albolabris =

Species of gastropod

Amastra albolabris was a species of air-breathing land snails, terrestrial pulmonate gastropod mollusks in the family Amastridae.

== Description ==
(Original description) The shell is conically ovate with an acute apex and six rounded, non-margined whorls. The aperture is ovate, and the columella is short with plicate teeth. The semilunar lip is thickened and white.

The shell is dark umber in color, highlighted by a yellow sutural line, with the interior a striking bluish-white

== Distribution ==
This species was endemic to Oʻahu, and was known from the Waiʻanae Range.
