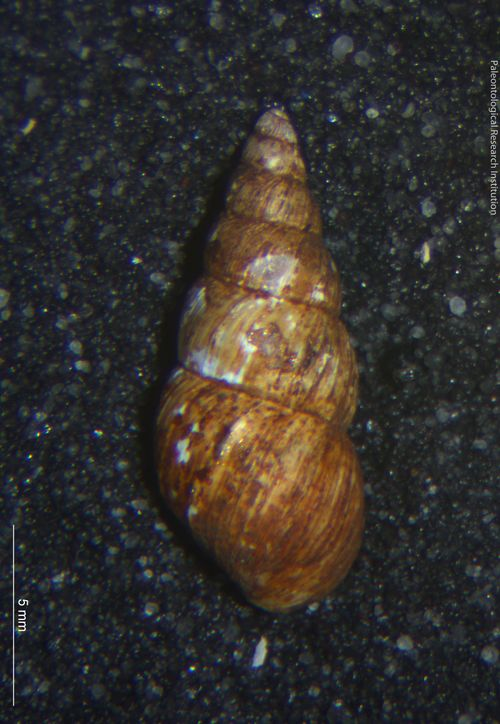
- Amastra elongata shell

Conservation status
- Extinct (IUCN 2.3)

- Presumed Extinct (NatureServe)

Scientific classification
- Kingdom: Animalia
- Phylum: Mollusca
- Class: Gastropoda
- Order: Stylommatophora
- Family: Amastridae
- Genus: Amastra
- Species: †A. elongata

Binomial name
- †Amastra elongata Newcomb, 1853
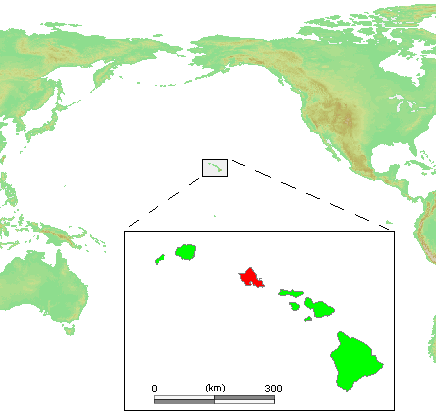
- Location of Oʻahu

Synonyms
- Achatinella acuta Newcomb, 1854 junior subjective synonym; Achatinella elongata Newcomb, 1853 superseded combination; Amastra (Heteramastra) elongata (Newcomb, 1853) alternative representation

= Amastra elongata =

Species of gastropod

Amastra elongata is an extinct species of air-breathing land snails, terrestrial pulmonate gastropod mollusks in the family Amastridae.

== Description ==
The shell is sinistral and sharply turreted, adorned with numerous well-defined longitudinal striae and covered by a brown epidermis. It consists of seven rounded whorls, with a deep and simple suture.

The aperture is ovate, and the columella bears a distinct plication. The outer lip is simple and unadorned.

== Distribution ==
This species was endemic to Hawai, occurring on Oʻahu.
