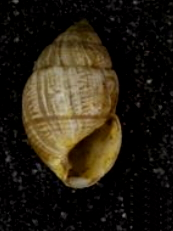

Conservation status
- Extinct (IUCN 2.3)

- Possibly Extinct (NatureServe)

Scientific classification
- Kingdom: Animalia
- Phylum: Mollusca
- Class: Gastropoda
- Order: Stylommatophora
- Family: Amastridae
- Genus: Amastra
- Species: †A. reticulata

Binomial name
- †Amastra reticulata (Newcomb, 1854)
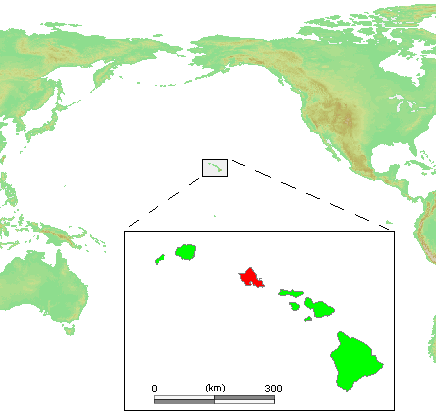
- Location of Oʻahu

Synonyms
- Achatinella reticulata Newcomb, 1854 superseded combination; Amastra (Metamastra) reticulata (Newcomb, 1854) alternative representation; Metamastra reticulata (Newcomb, 1854) superseded combination

= Amastra reticulata =

Species of mollusc

Amastra reticulata is an extinct species of air-breathing land snail, a terrestrial pulmonate gastropod mollusc in the family Amastridae.

Subspecies

- Amastra reticulata conspersa (L. Pfeiffer, 1855)
- Amastra reticulata dispersa Hyatt & Pilsbry, 1911
- Amastra reticulata errans Hyatt & Pilsbry, 1911
- Amastra reticulata orientalis Hyatt & Pilsbry, 1911
- Amastra reticulata reticulata (Newcomb, 1854)
- Amastra reticulata vespertina Pilsbry & C. M. Cooke, 1914

== Description ==
(Original description) The shell is conically ovate, consisting of six well-rounded whorls. The suture is moderately defined, becoming deeper at the junction with the last whorl. The aperture is small and ovate, while the short columella features a nearly transverse plicate tooth.

The shell's coloration ranges from brown to chestnut, adorned with intricate white transverse lines and markings. These patterns, resembling lacework or embroidery, are applied to the epidermis in various designs.

== Distribution ==
This species was endemic to Oʻahu, and was known from the Waiʻanae Range.
