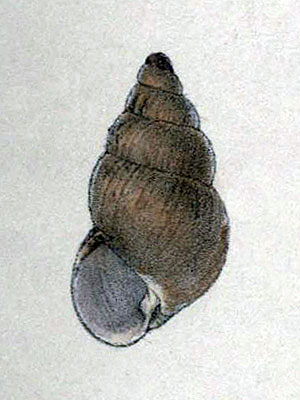

Conservation status
- Extinct (IUCN 2.3)

- Possibly Extinct (NatureServe)

Scientific classification
- Kingdom: Animalia
- Phylum: Mollusca
- Class: Gastropoda
- Order: Stylommatophora
- Family: Amastridae
- Genus: Amastra
- Species: †A. subsoror

Binomial name
- †Amastra subsoror Hyatt & Pilsbry, 1911
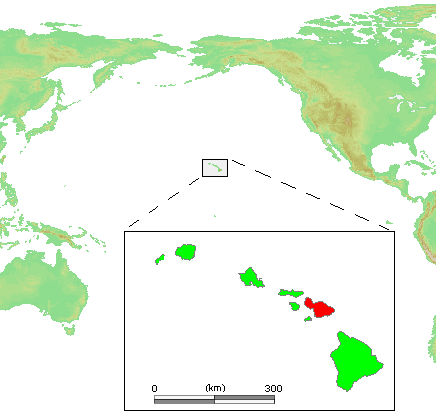
- Location of Maui

= Amastra subsoror =

Extinct Hawaiian land snail

Amastra subsoror was a species of air-breathing land snail, a terrestrial pulmonate gastropod mollusc in the family Amastridae.

Subspecies:

- Amastra subsoror auwahiensis Pilsbry & C. M. Cooke, 1914
- Amastra subsoror subsoror Hyatt & Pilsbry, 1911

== Description ==
It was described by George W. Tryon and Henry A. Pilsbry in their 1911 Manual of Conchology, and was last observed in 1946.

(Original description) The length of the shell attains 10 mm, its diameter 5 mm. The shell contains 5½ whorls. The shell is sinistral, narrowly rimate, and ovate-turrite, with a thin, dull brown surface. The spire tapers slightly near the summit. The whorls of the protoconch are reddish-brown, convex, and delicately striate, with arcuate striae that are thin and narrower than their intervals.

The subsequent whorls are strongly convex and brown, featuring subtle low growth wrinkles. The aperture is noticeably oblique and brown on the interior, with the outer lip only faintly thickened internally. A white callus emerges, reinforcing the basal lip within, its inward portion visible through the shell as a yellowish or whitish band surrounding the axial crevice.

The columella is straight, its edge narrowly dilated and bearing a strongly oblique, relatively small lamella, which is more pronounced on the interior. The parietal film is transparent.

== Distribution ==
It was endemic to Maui, Hawaii.

It is thought to have gone extinct due to the introduction of predators to its habitat, the destruction of its habitat, and overcollecting.
