= Ilex ternatiflora =

Conservation status
- Extinct (late 1800s) (IUCN 2.3)

Scientific classification
- Kingdom: Plantae
- Clade: Tracheophytes
- Clade: Angiosperms
- Clade: Eudicots
- Clade: Asterids
- Order: Aquifoliales
- Family: Aquifoliaceae
- Genus: Ilex
- Species: †I. ternatiflora

Binomial name
- †Ilex ternatiflora (C.Wright) R.A.Howard

Species of holly

Ilex ternatiflora is an extinct holly in the family Aquifoliaceae. It was endemic to a single location in Las Pozas in Pinar del Río Province, Cuba. It went extinct due to habitat destruction.

== Taxonomy ==
Modern taxonomy places this species as a synonym of Elaeodendron xylocarpum.
