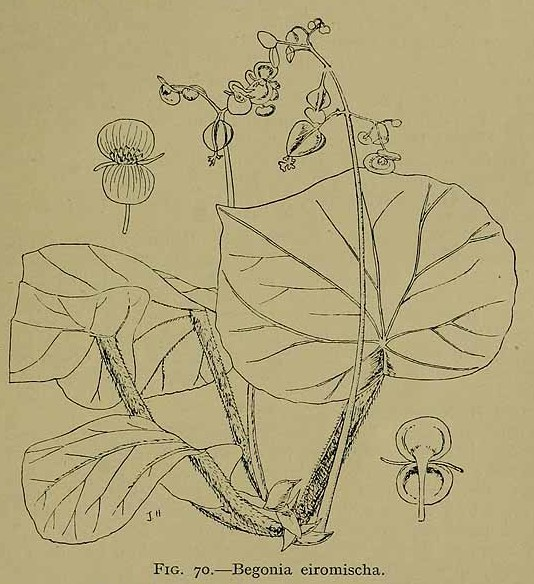

Conservation status
- Extinct (IUCN 3.1)

Scientific classification
- Kingdom: Plantae
- Clade: Tracheophytes
- Clade: Angiosperms
- Clade: Eudicots
- Clade: Rosids
- Order: Cucurbitales
- Family: Begoniaceae
- Genus: Begonia
- Species: †B. eiromischa

Binomial name
- †Begonia eiromischa Ridl.

= Begonia eiromischa =

Species of flowering plant from Peninsular Malaysia

Begonia eiromischa, commonly known as woolly-stalked begonia, is a presumed extinct plant from Malaysia.

It occurred at granite rocks at an elevation of 170 m in the proximity of dipterocarp forests. Begonia eiromischa is only known from two collections made in 1886 and 1898 at Pulau Betong, Penang Island in Malaysia. Its habitat was completely destroyed as a result of agricultural alteration, especially farming and logging. Despite extensive surveys it could not be rediscovered and so it was officially declared extinct by the IUCN in 2007.
