= Amastra tenuispira =

Conservation status
- Extinct (IUCN 2.3)

- Possibly Extinct (NatureServe)

Scientific classification
- Kingdom: Animalia
- Phylum: Mollusca
- Class: Gastropoda
- Order: Stylommatophora
- Family: Amastridae
- Genus: Amastra
- Species: †A. tenuispira

Binomial name
- †Amastra tenuispira (Baldwin, 1895)

Synonyms
- Amastra (Paramastra) tenuispira (Baldwin, 1895) alternative representation

Species of gastropod

Amastra tenuispira is an extinct species of air-breathing land snail, a terrestrial pulmonate gastropod mollusk in the family Amastridae.

The species was not extinct at the time of discovery. It has been assessed for The IUCN Red List of Threatened Species in 1996 as extinct.

== Description ==
The length of the shell attains 17 mm, its diameter 6.5 mm.

(Original description) The shell is dextral, imperforate, and solid, with an acuminately turreted shape and a conical spire. The apex is subacute. Its surface is lustreless, covered with somewhat coarse, irregular incremental striae, while the whorls of the protoconch are very finely radiately sulcated.

The color is light brown, with the upper whorls darker, and the shell is covered with an earthy brown, fugacious epidermis. The shell consists of 7 somewhat convex whorls, with some specimens showing a slight margining above; the suture is well impressed.

The aperture is oval and oblique, rather small, with a light-brown interior. The peristome is simple and acute, with the extremities united by a thin callosity. The columella is sub-biplicate, light-brown, tortuous, and abruptly terminates in an oblique, dentiform plait.

(Later supplemental description by Hyatt, A. & Pilsbry, H. A. ) The shell is very thick, with the body whorl being white or pale buff, often with a pinkish tint towards the apex. The spire is gray or brownish, while the embryonic whorls are dark brown. Small spots and fragments of a brown outer cuticle are occasionally present on the body whorl.

In some specimens, there is an impressed line just below the suture on the last few whorls. The entire interior is pink-tinted, though sometimes it appears nearly white. A low, more oblique fold is present above the usual columellar plait, which is more prominent in some specimens than in others.

== Distribution ==
This extinct species was endemic to Hawaii and occurred on the Oahu Island.
