= Rachis sanguineus =

Conservation status
- Extinct (IUCN 2.3)

Scientific classification
- Kingdom: Animalia
- Phylum: Mollusca
- Class: Gastropoda
- Order: Stylommatophora
- Family: Cerastidae
- Genus: Rachis
- Species: †R. sanguineus

Binomial name
- †Rachis sanguineus (Barclay, 1857)

Extinct species of gastropod

Rachis sanguineus is an extinct species of air-breathing land snail, a terrestrial pulmonate gastropod mollusk in the superfamily Enoidea. This species was endemic to Mauritius.
