= Achatinella bulimoides elegans =

Conservation status
- Extinct (IUCN 2.3)

- Possibly Extinct (NatureServe)
- CITES Appendix I

Scientific classification
- Kingdom: Animalia
- Phylum: Mollusca
- Class: Gastropoda
- Order: Stylommatophora
- Family: Achatinellidae
- Genus: Achatinella
- Species: A. bulimoides
- Subspecies: A. b. elegans

Trinomial name
- Achatinella bulimoides elegans Newcomb, 1854
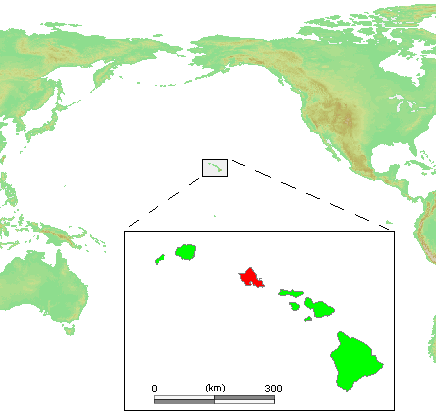
- Location of Oʻahu

Synonyms
- Achatinella (Bulimella) bulimoides elegans Newcomb, 1854 alternative representation; Achatinella (Bulimella) candida L. Pfeiffer, 1855 alternative representation; Achatinella (Bulimella) elegans Newcomb, 1854; Achatinella candida L. Pfeiffer, 1855 junior subjective synonym; Achatinella elegans Newcomb, 1854 superseded combination

Extinct species of gastropod

Achatinella bulimoides elegans is an extinct subspecies of land snail, a gastropod in the family Achatinellidae.

== Distribution ==
It was endemic to Oʻahu.

== Shell description ==
The dextral or sinistral shell is conically-elongate, solid, plano-convex and margined above with the suture well impressed. The shell has six whorls. The aperture is subovate and the white lip is expanded, unreflected, somewhat contracted in its center and thickened within. The short columella is flat and lightly toothed. The glossy shell color is alternating light and dark-brown, arranged in longitudinal lines or broad patches. Sometimes with a white sutural band and a white band on the body whorl.

The height of the shell is 23.1 mm. The width of the shell is 10.3 mm.
