= Cyperus rockii =

Conservation status
- Extinct (IUCN 3.1)

Scientific classification
- Kingdom: Plantae
- Clade: Tracheophytes
- Clade: Angiosperms
- Clade: Monocots
- Clade: Commelinids
- Order: Poales
- Family: Cyperaceae
- Genus: Cyperus
- Species: †C. rockii

Binomial name
- †Cyperus rockii Kük.

Species of plant endemic to Hawaii

Cyperus rockii is an extinct species of sedge that was endemic to parts of Hawaii.

The species was first formally described by the botanist Georg Kükenthal in 1920. It was assessed by the IUCN as extinct in 2016, though it was last seen in 1916.

== See also ==
- List of Cyperus species
