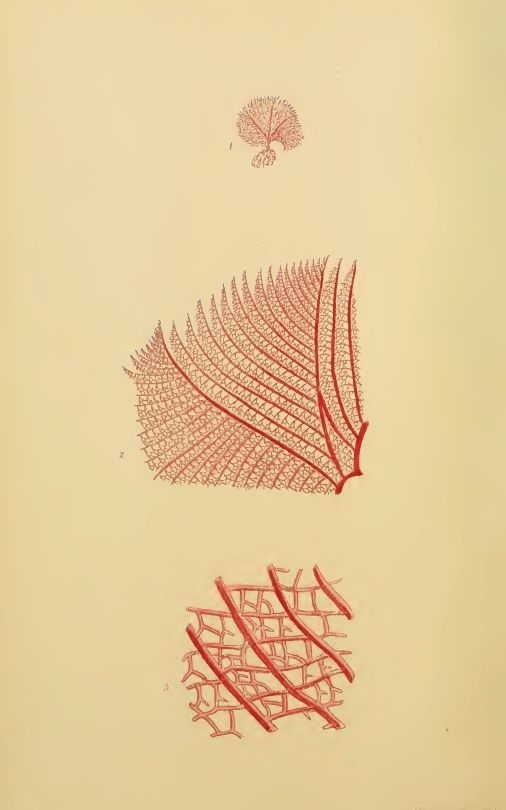
- Claudea bennettiana (Vanvoorstia bennettiana) by William Henry Harvey

Conservation status
- Extinct (late 19th century) (IUCN 3.1)

Scientific classification
- Domain: Eukaryota
- Clade: Archaeplastida
- Division: Rhodophyta
- Class: Florideophyceae
- Order: Ceramiales
- Family: Delesseriaceae
- Genus: Vanvoorstia
- Species: †V. bennettiana

Binomial name
- †Vanvoorstia bennettiana (Harvey) Papenfuss (1855)

Synonyms
- Claudea bennettiana Sonderia bennettiana

= Vanvoorstia bennettiana =

Bennett's seaweed

Extinct species of red algae

Vanvoorstia bennettiana (Bennett's seaweed) is an extinct red algae from Australia. It is named after naturalist George Bennett.

== Biology ==
Vanvoorstia bennetiana was a small red algae. Like other members of its genus, V. bennettiana did not have significant differences in morphology throughout any phase of its life cycle. It can be distinguished from other members of its genus by its small size and by the structure of its reproductive organs. The overall structure of the algae is that of a blade with fine meshing. For much of the time it was extant, the algae was common.

The algae has only been found in two localities; both in or near Sydney Harbour. One was near the eastern part of Spectacle Island, where it was discovered between May 1 and May 15, 1855. The other was in a channel between Point Piper and Shark Island, where numerous specimens were collected in 1886.

== Extinction ==
Since the V. bennettiana's discovery, Sydney Harbour has been massively altered by human activities. These activities substantially increased the siltation level in Sydney Harbour. Fine-meshed algae species are especially vulnerable to this type of disturbance because the particulate matter can often clog the blade and prevent light necessary for photosynthesis from reaching the organism.

A search by Arthur Lucas in 1916 failed to find the species. Since it had been only found in two places, V. bennettiana became extinct by then. The causes were human disturbance, habitat destruction, and pollution. Searches along the entire coastline of New South Wales failed to locate the species. The IUCN Red List listed V. bennettiana as extinct after an assessment in 2003.

Vanvoorstia bennettiana was, until an update in 2007, the only protist anywhere on the IUCN's Red List.
