= Pseudophilautus halyi =

Conservation status
- Extinct (IUCN 3.1)

Scientific classification
- Kingdom: Animalia
- Phylum: Chordata
- Class: Amphibia
- Order: Anura
- Family: Rhacophoridae
- Genus: Pseudophilautus
- Species: †P. halyi

Binomial name
- †Pseudophilautus halyi (Boulenger, 1904)

Synonyms
- Ixalus halyi Boulenger, 1904; Rhacophorus halyi (Boulenger, 1904); Philautus halyi (Boulenger, 1904)

Extinct species of amphibian

Pseudophilautus halyi, known as pattipola shrub frog, is an extinct species of frog in the family Rhacophoridae. It was endemic to Sri Lanka. It is only known from the holotype collected in 1899 (or before). The specific name halyi honours Amyrald Haly, the first director of the Ceylon Museum, author of the "Natural History of Ceylon", and the collector of the holotype.

== Description ==
The holotype is an adult male measuring 28 mm (1.1 in) in snout–vent length. The body is stout. The snout is bluntly angled dorsally and rounded in profile. The tympanum is visible, and the supratympanic fold is prominent. The canthal edges are sharp. Skin is granular or shagreened with glandular warts. The fingers have dermal fringes whereas the toes are medially webbed. The upper parts of the alcohol-preserved specimen are uniformly brown and the underside is pale yellowish brown.

== Distribution and conservation ==
The holotype was collected in 1899 (or before) in Pattipola at 1,890 m (6,200 ft) above sea level. No other specimens are known, despite extensive field surveys in modern times. The habitat requirements of this species are unknown. The reasons for its demise are also unknown, but probably involved habitat loss.

Pseudophilautus halyi is only known from the holotype from Pattipola, Sri Lanka.
