= Taipidon octolamellata =

Conservation status
- Extinct (IUCN 2.3)

Scientific classification
- Kingdom: Animalia
- Phylum: Mollusca
- Class: Gastropoda
- Order: Stylommatophora
- Family: Endodontidae
- Genus: †Taipidon
- Species: †T. octolamellata

Binomial name
- †Taipidon octolamellata Garrett, 1887

Species of gastropod

Taipidon octolamellata was a species of air-breathing land snail, a terrestrial pulmonate gastropod mollusc in the family Endodontidae. This species was endemic to French Polynesia; it is now extinct.
