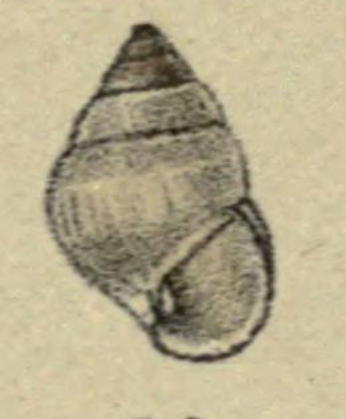
- Shell of Amastra pellucida

Conservation status
- Extinct (IUCN 2.3)

- Possibly Extinct (NatureServe)

Scientific classification
- Kingdom: Animalia
- Phylum: Mollusca
- Class: Gastropoda
- Order: Stylommatophora
- Family: Amastridae
- Genus: Amastra
- Species: †A. pellucida

Binomial name
- †Amastra pellucida (Baldwin, 1895)
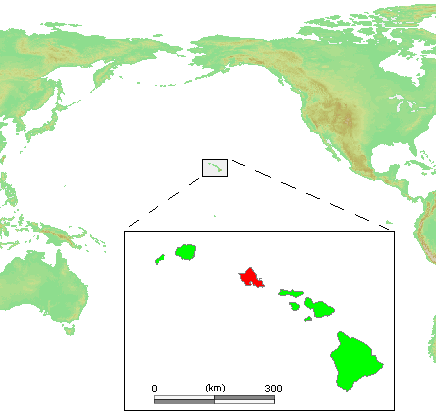
- Location of Oʻahu

Synonyms
- Achatinella (Amastra) pellucida Baldwin, 1895; Amastra (Metamastra) pellucida (Baldwin, 1895)

= Amastra pellucida =

Species of gastropod

Amastra pellucida is an extinct species of air-breathing land snail, a terrestrial pulmonate gastropod mollusk in the family Amastridae.

The species wasn't extinct at the time of discovery. It has been assessed for The IUCN Red List of Threatened Species in 1996 as extinct.

== Description ==
(Original description) The length of the shell attains 12.5 mm (0.5 in), its diameter 8 mm (0.3 in).

The shell is dextral, imperforate, and exceptionally fragile. It is thin, translucent, and globosely conic, with a rather acute apex. The surface is lusterless, adorned with fine incremental lines, while the apical whorls remain smooth.

The coloration is light brown, with a darker apex, and the shell lacks an epidermis. It consists of 5½ somewhat convex whorls, with a moderately impressed suture.

The aperture is oval and slightly oblique, with a livid-white interior. The peristome is simple and thin, while the columella is white, flexuous, and ends abruptly in a delicate lamellar plait.

The animal is uniformly brown, with the head and tentacles exhibiting a slightly darker shade. The heartbeat is clearly visible through the thin, translucent shell. Upon initial collection, the heart pulsated at a rate of approximately fifty beats per minute. Over time, the pulsations gradually slowed and weakened until the animal eventually expired.

(Later supplemental description by Hyatt, A. & Pilsbry, H. A. ) The type specimen is an adult shell, white beneath a thin, pale straw-colored cuticle, which is partially deciduous, forming a band just below the suture. The first three whorls are smooth and light brown. While the shell is thin, it is moderately strong and not fragile.

The aperture is white internally, and the lip is reinforced by a narrow but distinct white rib along its edge. The columellar lamella is robust and subhorizontal. All four specimens in the type lot exhibit an extremely narrow umbilical slit.

Due to the angularity of the shell's base around the axis, the junction of the columellar and basal lips forms a somewhat spout-like structure.

== Distribution ==
This extinct species was endemic to Oʻahu, and was known from the Waiʻanae Valley.
