= Partula navigatoria =

- Two live individuals of Partula navigatoria in situ, Hamoa Valley, Raiatea, 1992.

Conservation status
- Extinct in the Wild (IUCN 3.1)

Scientific classification
- Kingdom: Animalia
- Phylum: Mollusca
- Class: Gastropoda
- Order: Stylommatophora
- Family: Partulidae
- Genus: Partula
- Species: P. navigatoria

Binomial name
- Partula navigatoria (L. Pfeiffer, 1849)

Synonyms
- Bulimus (Partula) navigatorius L. Pfeiffer, 1849; Partula fusca Pease, 1866; Partula levilineata H. E. Crampton, 1956; Partula protea L. Pfeiffer, 1877; Partula radiata Pease, 1864; Partula variabilis Pease, 1866; Partula vittata Pease, 1866; Partula vittata var. approximata Garrett, 1884; Partula vittata var. terrestris Garrett, 1884

Species of gastropod

Partula navigatoria is a species of air-breathing, ground-dwelling tropical land snail in the family Partulidae. This species has been extinct in the wild since 1992.

== Subspecies ==
There are three subspecies recognized:

- Partula navigatoria levilineata H. E. Crampton, 1956
- Partula navigatoria navigatoria (L. Pfeiffer, 1849)
- Partula navigatoria radiata Pease, 1864

== Distribution ==
This species was endemic to Raʻiātea, French Polynesia, but is now considered extinct in the wild due to predation by introduced rosy wolf snails (Euglandina rosea). It may now be impossible to reestablish this species in its native range, due to the presence of the predatory flatworm Platydemus manokwari which ground-dwelling species such as Partula navigatoria are susceptible to.
