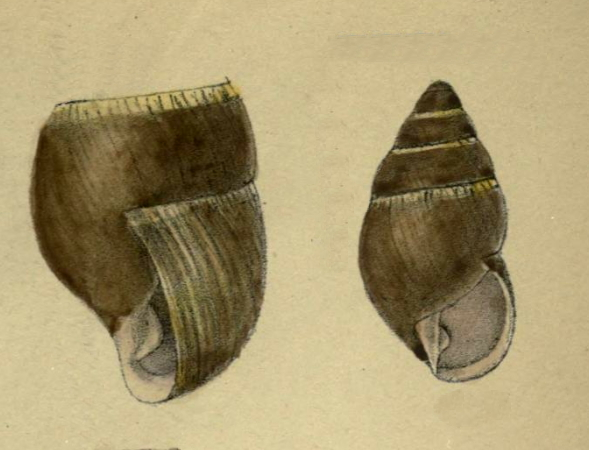
- Shell of Amastra petricola

Scientific classification
- Kingdom: Animalia
- Phylum: Mollusca
- Class: Gastropoda
- Order: Stylommatophora
- Family: Amastridae
- Genus: Amastra
- Species: A. petricola

Binomial name
- Amastra petricola (Newcomb, 1855)

Synonyms
- Achatinella petricola Newcomb, 1855 superseded combination; Achatinella petricola L. Pfeiffer, 1856 junior subjective synonym; Amastra (Amastra) petricola (Newcomb, 1855) alternative representation

= Amastra petricola =

Species of mollusc

Amastra petricola is a species of air-breathing land snail, a terrestrial pulmonate gastropod mollusc in the family Amastridae.

== Description ==
The length of the shell attains 10.2 mm, its diameter 5.9 mm

The dextral shell is sharply conical, with prominent, coarse longitudinal striations. It comprises 5½ rounded whorls, with the body whorl occasionally exhibiting inflation. The suture is simple and distinctly marked.

The aperture is broadly ovate, featuring an acute lip that is subtly thickened on the inner side. The columella is relatively elongated, bearing a subcentral, revolving plait. The shell is often umbilicate or narrowly perforate. Its coloration is a rich, dark, horn-like tone, accentuated by the outer and columellar lips, which are delicately edged with white or pale yellowish-white.

Amastra petricola is ovate-conic, with spire outlines that are nearly straight or very slightly convex. The embryonic shell is finely marked with extremely delicate longitudinal striae, while the later whorls display coarse, low growth folds. The shell's color is a subdued olive-tinted brown, with embryonic whorls that are either the same hue or a dark purple-black.

After the embryonic stage, a distinct yellow line appears below the suture, transitioning into a well-defined band on the final 1½ to 2 whorls. Just behind the aperture, a broad yellow streak runs toward the umbilical region, forming a crescent-shaped yellow patch around the narrowly umbilicate axis. An obtuse ridge encircles the umbilicus.

Fresh specimens exhibit a very thin, dull light-brown cuticle over a glossy underlying layer that can appear in angular patches. The outer lip is acute, with a margin lined by a white callus internally. The columella is vertical, its edge reflexed into a narrow triangular shape that overhangs the umbilicus and forms a slight channel at its junction with the basal lip. It bears a prominent fold that terminates noticeably far from the edge of the aperture.

== Distribution ==
This species is endemic to Hawaii, occurring on Molokai island.
