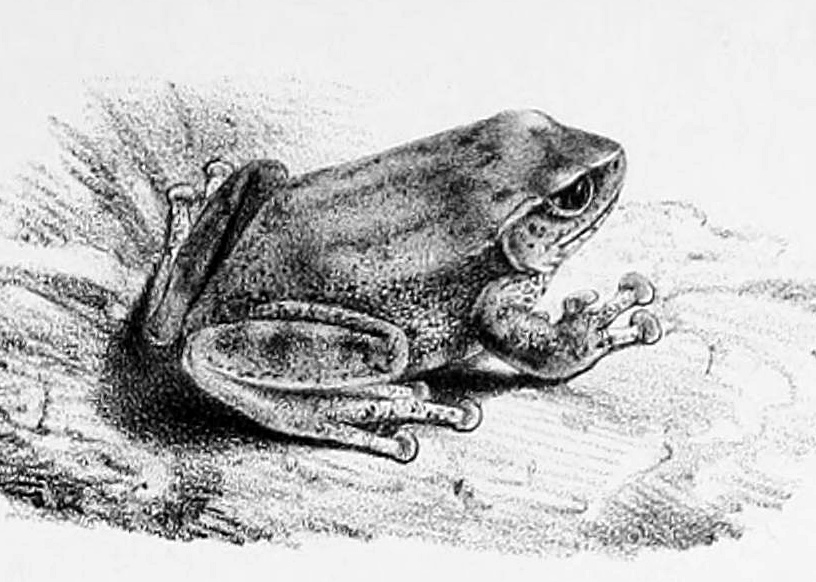

Conservation status
- Extinct (IUCN 3.1)

Scientific classification
- Kingdom: Animalia
- Phylum: Chordata
- Class: Amphibia
- Order: Anura
- Family: Rhacophoridae
- Genus: Pseudophilautus
- Species: †P. variabilis

Binomial name
- †Pseudophilautus variabilis (Günther, 1858)

Synonyms
- Ixalus variabilis Günther, 1858; Rhacophorus variabilis (Günther, 1858); Philautus variabilis (Günther, 1858)

= Pseudophilautus variabilis =

Extinct species of amphibian

Pseudophilautus variabilis, also known as the variable bush frog or variable bubble-nest frog, was a species of frog in the family Rhacophoridae. This now extinct species was endemic to Sri Lanka. Despite extensive searches in recent times, it is only known from collections prior to 1858. The reasons for its disappearance are unknown but probably involve habitat loss.

== Taxonomy ==
Pseudophilautus variabilis is only known with certainty from its lectotype. The original type series consisted of ten syntypes, probably representing collections from several locations but without more specific information on their origins than "Ceylon". Therefore, the female illustrated in the species description was chosen as the lectotype in 2001. One of the paralectotypes was in 2007 described as a new species, Pseudophilautus pardus, by Meegaskumbura and colleagues.

Pseudophilautus wynaadensis from India has sometimes been mixed with this species.

== Description ==
The lectotype of Pseudophilautus variabilis is an adult female that measures 36–37 mm (1.4–1.5 in) in snout–vent length. The body is moderately elongate. The tympanum is rather indistinct while the supra-tympanic fold is distinct. The fingers and toes are moderately long; fingers have dermal fringes but no webbing whereas toes are medially webbed.
