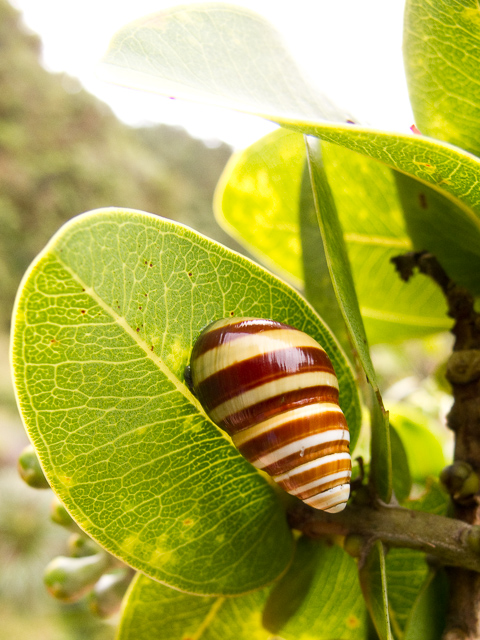
- Live specimen
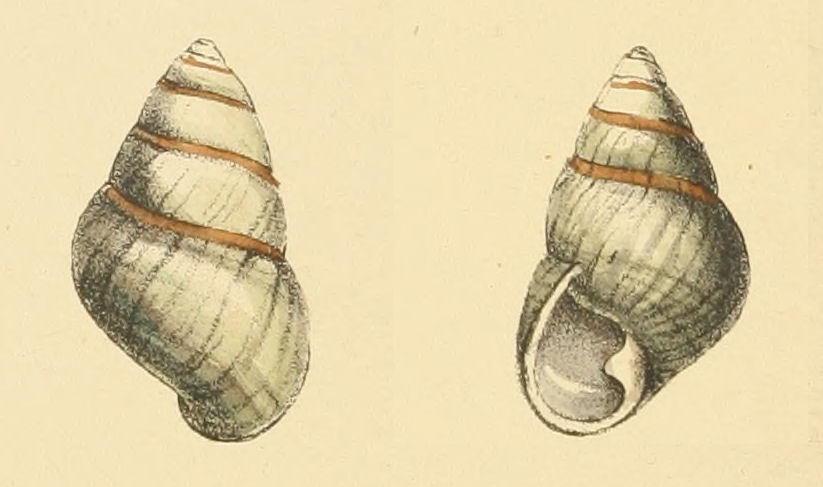
- Drawing of a shell of Achatinella livida

Conservation status
- Extinct (IUCN 2.3)

- Critically Imperiled (NatureServe)
- CITES Appendix I

Scientific classification
- Kingdom: Animalia
- Phylum: Mollusca
- Class: Gastropoda
- Order: Stylommatophora
- Family: Achatinellidae
- Genus: Achatinella
- Subgenus: Achatinellastrum
- Species: †A. livida

Binomial name
- †Achatinella livida Swainson, 1828
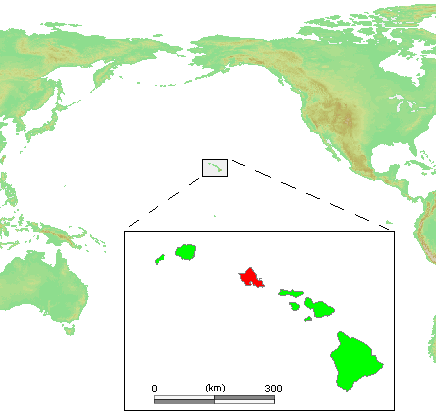
- Location of Oʻahu

= Achatinella livida =

Extinct species of gastropod

Achatinella livida is a rare species of air-breathing land snail in the family Achatinellidae. This species is endemic to Oʻahu, Hawaiʻi.

== Description ==
Achatinella livida shells can reach a length of 17mm and a diameter of 9.0mm, with up to six whorls. Their shell is shaped like a cone with a pointed top. Their shells are livid brown to purple, and the tip of the shell slowly transitions to white. The shell's seam is separated by a distinct line that contains a deep orange-brown color.

== Distribution and habitat ==
Achatinella livida is endemic to the Northern Ko'olau mountains on the island of O'ahu. Achatinella livida can be found in their native moist forest habitat on Metrosideros polymorpha ('Ohi'a lehua).

== Conservation status ==
Achatinella livida is classified as critically imperiled as of 2014 with a wild population size estimate of at least 76 individuals. Similar to most Hawaiian tree snails, there are various threats to its survival, such as habitat loss and being endangered by Euglandina rosea and other predators. In 2014, the captive population of A. livida consisted of 25 individuals, including three adults. This captive population was founded in 1997 with 13 adults taken from its original range.

In 2019, the captive population had declined to 19 individuals. As of 2024, the population is now at 208 individuals.
