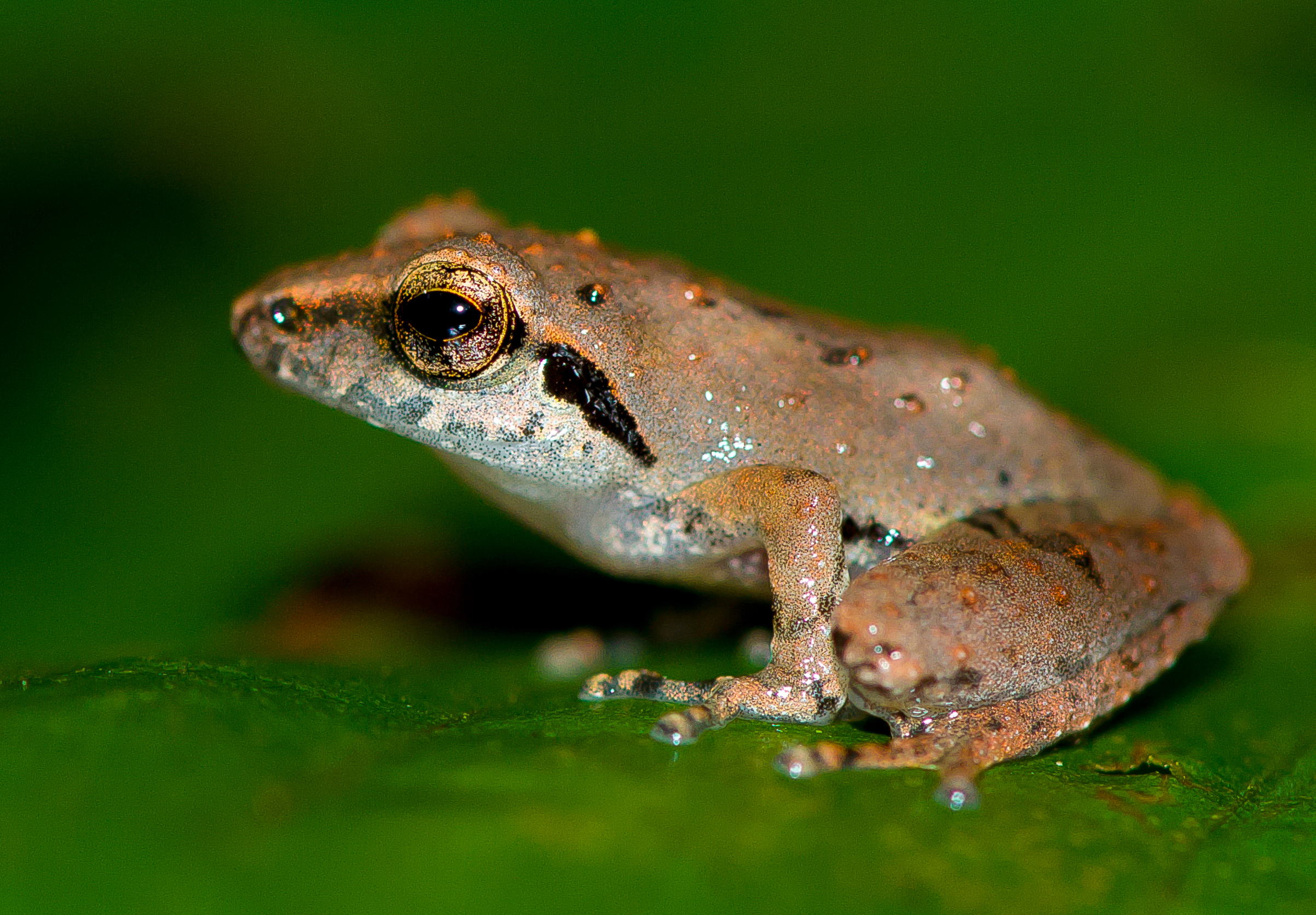

Conservation status
- Least Concern (IUCN 3.1)

Scientific classification
- Kingdom: Animalia
- Phylum: Chordata
- Class: Amphibia
- Order: Anura
- Family: Rhacophoridae
- Genus: Pseudophilautus
- Species: P. wynaadensis

Binomial name
- Pseudophilautus wynaadensis (Jerdon, 1853)

Synonyms
- Phyllomedusa ? wynaadensis Jerdon, 1853; Philautus (Philautus) wynaadensis (Jerdon, 1853); Ixalus wynaadensis (Jerdon, 1853); Kirtixalus wynaadensis (Jerdon, 1853)

= Pseudophilautus wynaadensis =

Species of amphibian

Pseudophilautus wynaadensis, commonly known as the Wayanad bush frog, common bush frog, jerdon's bush frog, plain-colored bush frog, Malabar coast frog, or dark-eared bush frog, is a species of frog in the family Rhacophoridae. It is endemic to the Western Ghats of southwest India.

== Description ==
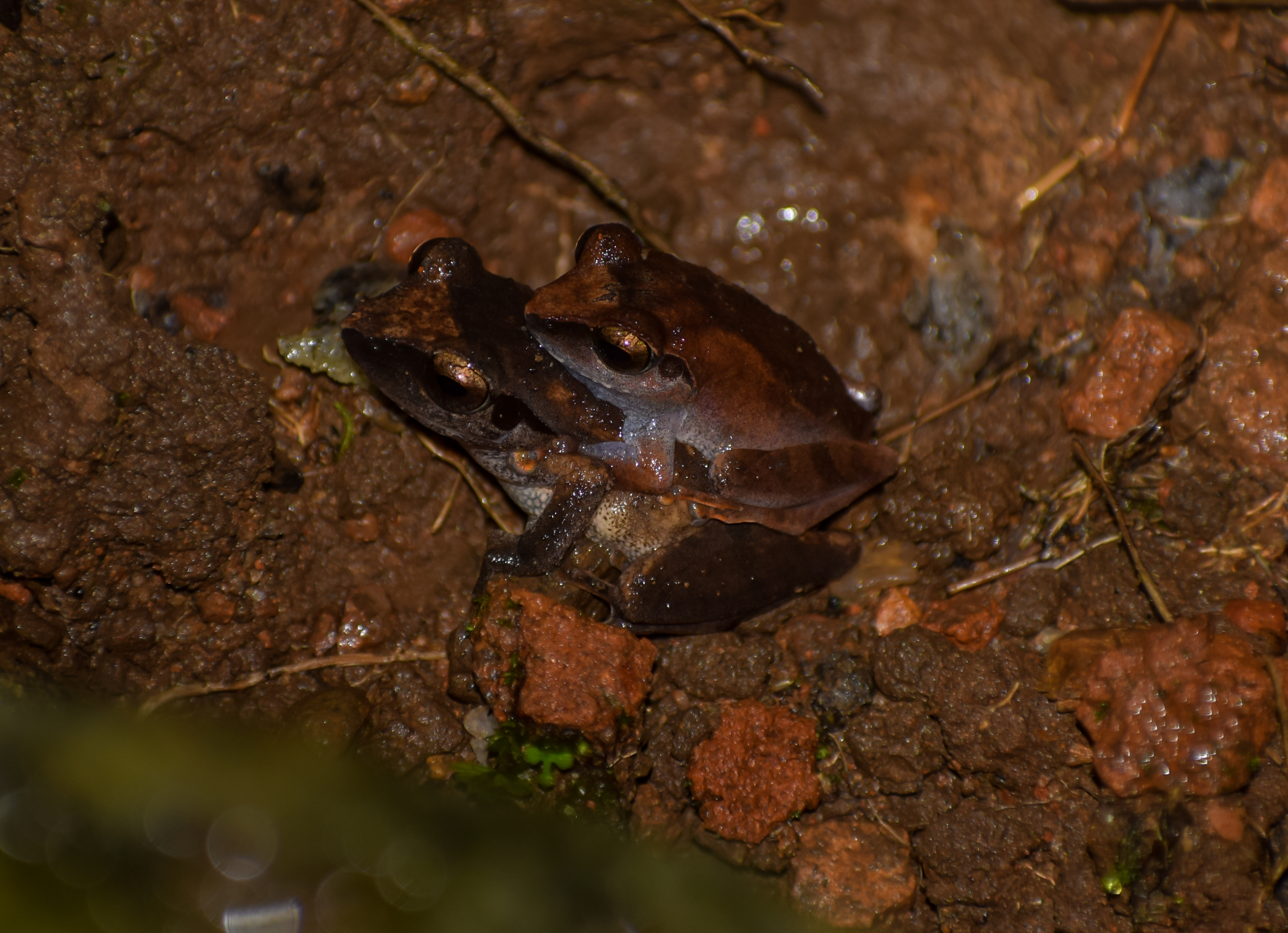
Pseudophilautus wynaadensis in amplexus in Bisle ghats

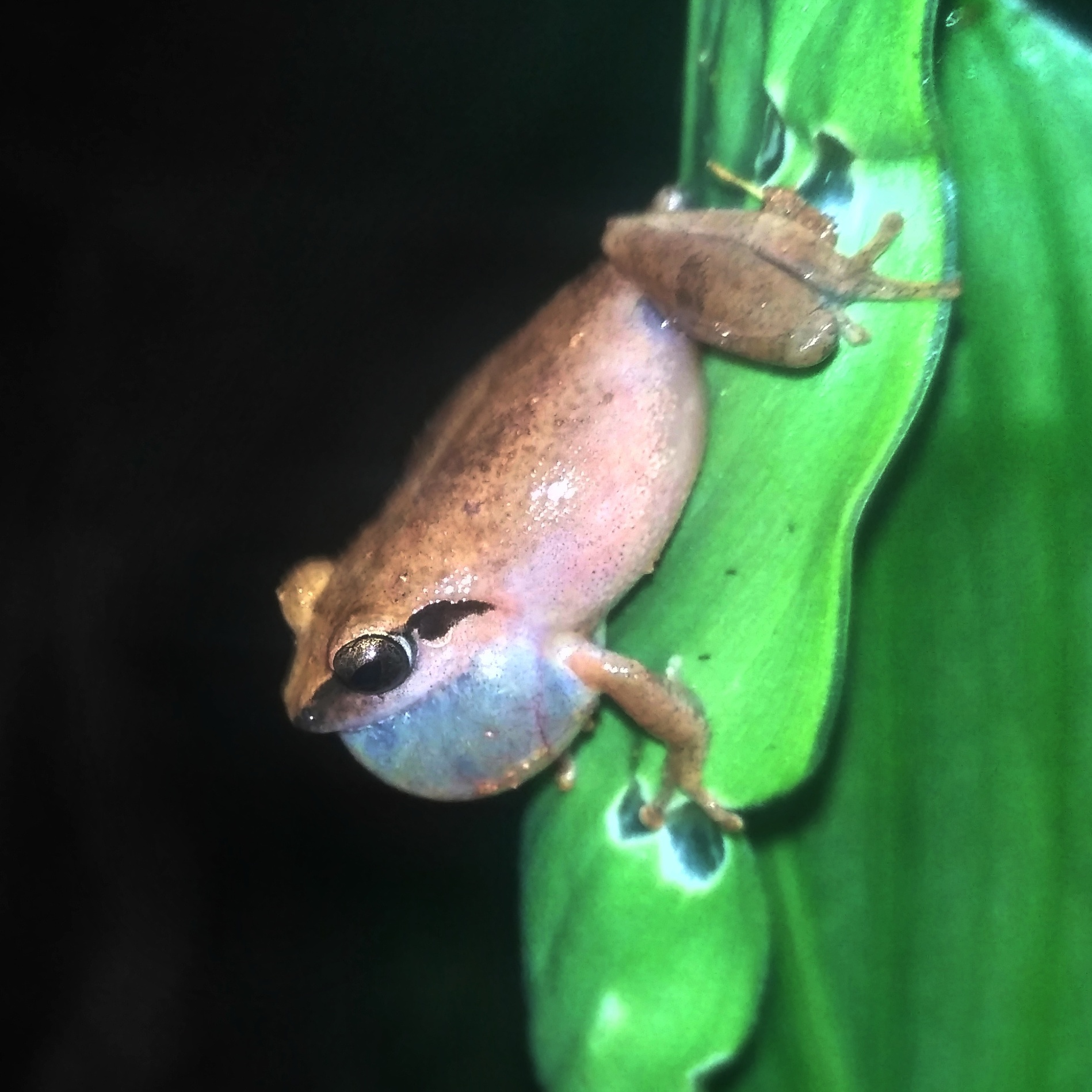
Vocalising male from Kerala

Pseudophilautus wynaadensis males measure 24–28 mm (0.94–1.10 in) in snout–vent length; a female measured 27 mm (1.1 in) SVL. The body is rather slender. Colouration varies, even within the same population, from uniform grey to brownish or reddish grey. The upper two-thirds of the tympanum is dark black. The dorsum has spinular projections.

== Distribution ==
It is found widely in southern Western Ghats from the regions of Coorg and Wayanad to Periyar, on both sides of the Palakkad Gap.

== Habitat ==
Pseudophilautus wynaadensis is associated with the understorey of tropical moist evergreen forest and shrubland, as well as secondary forest and cultivated land (such as tea and coffee plantations). It is among the most common bush frogs in the area, and a dominant one in wayside vegetation and urban areas. It is nocturnal and arboreal.
