= Puzzle elimia =

Conservation status
- Vulnerable (IUCN 3.1)

- Critically Imperiled (NatureServe)

Scientific classification
- Kingdom: Animalia
- Phylum: Mollusca
- Class: Gastropoda
- Subclass: Caenogastropoda
- Order: incertae sedis
- Family: Pleuroceridae
- Genus: Elimia
- Species: E. varians

Binomial name
- Elimia varians (I. Lea, 1861)

Species of gastropod

The puzzle elimia (Elimia varians) is a species of freshwater snail with an operculum, aquatic gastropod mollusc in the family Pleuroceridae. This species is endemic to the Cahaba River system of Bibb County, Alabama in the United States
