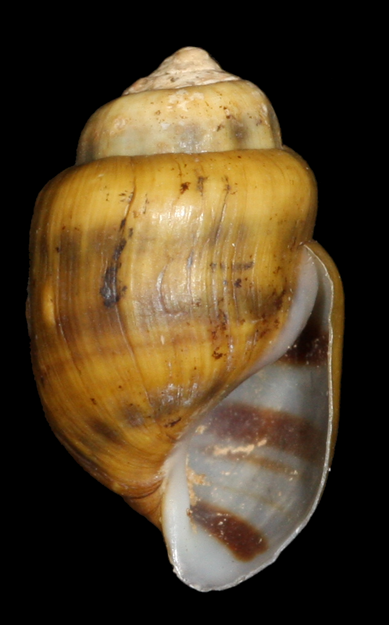
- Lectotype of Elimia showalteri (ANSP 26881)

Conservation status
- Critically Imperiled (NatureServe)

Scientific classification
- Kingdom: Animalia
- Phylum: Mollusca
- Class: Gastropoda
- Subclass: Caenogastropoda
- Order: incertae sedis
- Family: Pleuroceridae
- Genus: Elimia
- Species: E. showalteri

Binomial name
- Elimia showalteri (I. Lea, 1860)

Synonyms
- Lithasia showalterii I. Lea, 1860; Melania purpurea I. Lea, 1861

= Elimia showalteri =

Species of gastropod

Elimia showalteri, common name the compact elimia, is a species of freshwater snail in the family Pleuroceridae.

== Shell description ==
Elimia showalteri has a large, robust, smooth shell boldly colored brown and/or green shell.

== Anatomy ==
Elimia showalteri is agill-breathing snail. It is genetically very similar to the lacy elimia Elimia crenatella.

== Distribution ==
This snail is endemic to the Upper Cahaba River in Alabama, the United States.

== Ecology ==
=== Habitat ===
Compact elimia are found grazing individually throughout shoal habitats.

=== Life cycle ===
Embryos develop into trochophore larvae before eventually becoming veliger larvae.

=== Feeding habits ===
These snails are known to graze individually in shoal habitats.
