= Leptoxis carinata =

Crested Mudalia

Conservation status
- Least Concern (IUCN 3.1)

- Secure (NatureServe)

Scientific classification
- Kingdom: Animalia
- Phylum: Mollusca
- Class: Gastropoda
- Subclass: Caenogastropoda
- Order: incertae sedis
- Family: Pleuroceridae
- Genus: Leptoxis
- Species: L. carinata

Binomial name
- Leptoxis carinata (Bruguière, 1792)

Synonyms
- Anculosa canalifera Anthony, 1860; Anculosa carinata Lea, 1841; Anculosa corpulenta Anthony, 1860; Anculosa dentata Lea, 1841; Anculosa variabilis Lea, 1841; Anculotus dentatus Couthouy, 1839; Anculotus monodontoides Conrad, 1834; Anculotus nigrescens Conrad, 1834; Anculotus trivittata DeKay, 1843; Bulimus carinatus Bruguière, 1789; Helix subcarinata Wood, 1828; Melania nickliniana Lea, 1841; Paludina dissimilis Say, 1819

Species of gastropod

Leptoxis carinata, common name the crested mudalia, is a species of freshwater snail with an operculum, an aquatic gastropod mollusc in the family Pleuroceridae.

== Shell description ==
Leptoxis carinata has a strong globose shell, with highly variable sculpture. In various creeks and rivers throughout its range, populations may be found with spiral cords, a single carina or keel, variously developed, or lacking sculpture.

== Distribution ==
This species occurs in unpolluted large creeks and high-gradient rivers in the Atlantic drainages of the United States, from New York to North Carolina.

== Ecology ==
=== Habitat ===
Leptoxis carinata is found in high-gradient streams, generally in the faster flowing riffles and drops, where it clings firmly to large stones and bedrock exposures.

=== Life cycle ===
Leptoxis carinata is semelparous biennial.

This species, unlike softer shelled physid snails, grows very slowly, and has the lowest intrinsic rate of increase (this means that populations grow very slowly), along with Elimia virginica, in this environment.
