= Coldwater elimia =

Conservation status
- Least Concern (IUCN 3.1)

- Secure (NatureServe)

Scientific classification
- Kingdom: Animalia
- Phylum: Mollusca
- Class: Gastropoda
- Subclass: Caenogastropoda
- Order: incertae sedis
- Family: Pleuroceridae
- Genus: Elimia
- Species: E. modesta

Binomial name
- Elimia modesta (Lea, 1845)

Synonyms
- Elimia gerhardti (Lea, 1862)

Species of gastropod

The coldwater elimia (Elimia modesta) is a species of freshwater snail in the family Pleuroceridae. It is an aquatic gastropod mollusk with an operculum. This species is endemic to Alabama and Georgia in the United States.
