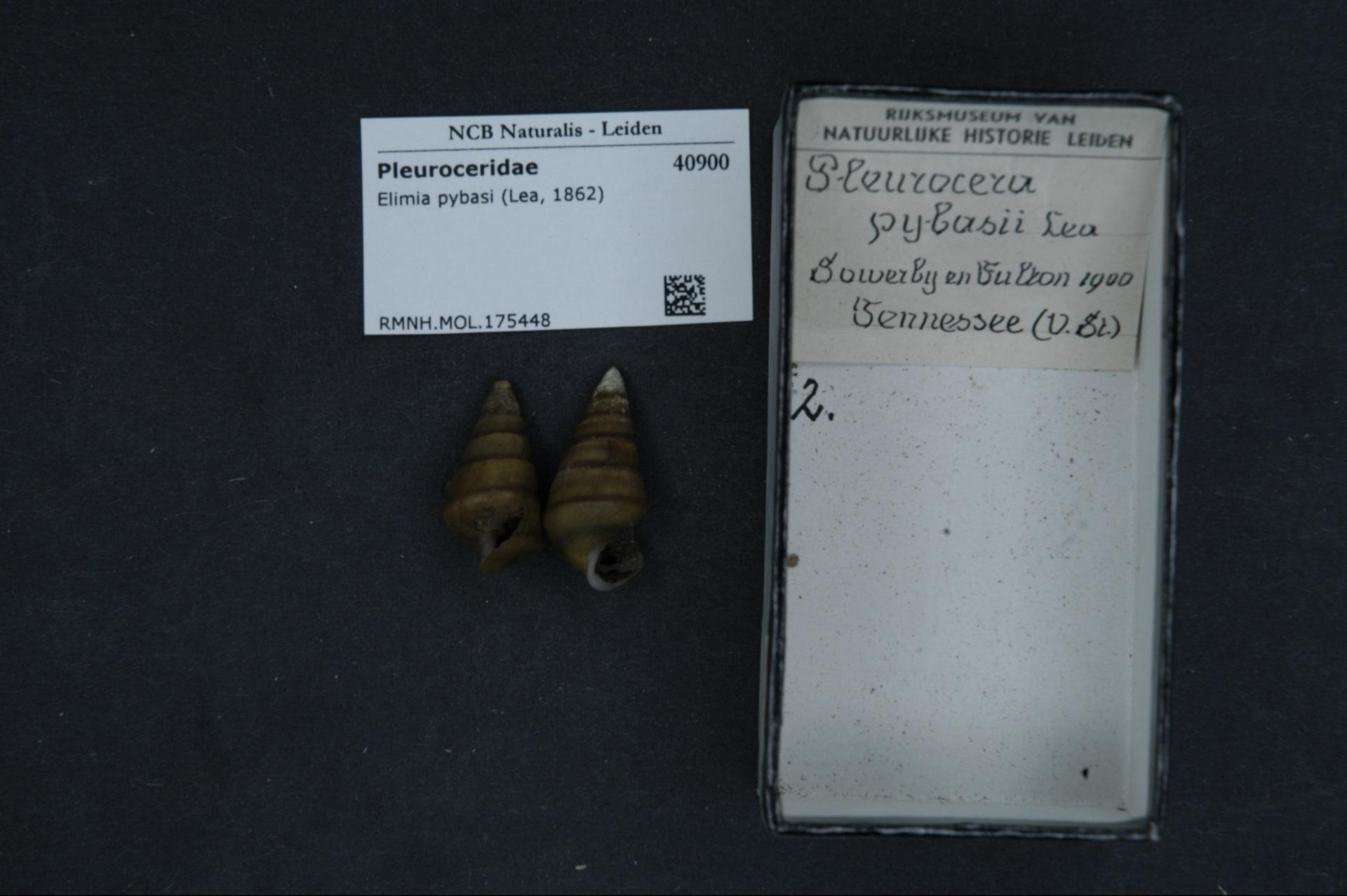

Conservation status
- Vulnerable (IUCN 2.3)

- Imperiled (NatureServe)

Scientific classification
- Kingdom: Animalia
- Phylum: Mollusca
- Class: Gastropoda
- Subclass: Caenogastropoda
- Order: incertae sedis
- Family: Pleuroceridae
- Genus: Elimia
- Species: E. pybasii

Binomial name
- Elimia pybasii I. Lea, 1862

= Elimia pybasii =

Species of gastropod

Elimia pybasii is a species of freshwater snail with an operculum, aquatic gastropod molluscs in the family Pleuroceridae. This species is endemic to the United States.
