= Spindle elimia =

Conservation status
- Vulnerable (IUCN 2.3)

- Presumed Extinct (NatureServe)

Scientific classification
- Kingdom: Animalia
- Phylum: Mollusca
- Class: Gastropoda
- Subclass: Caenogastropoda
- Order: incertae sedis
- Family: Pleuroceridae
- Genus: Elimia
- Species: E. capillaris

Binomial name
- Elimia capillaris I. Lea, 1861

Species of gastropod

The spindle elimia (Elimia capillaris) is a species of freshwater snails with an operculum, aquatic gastropod mollusks in the family Pleuroceridae. This species is endemic to the United States.
