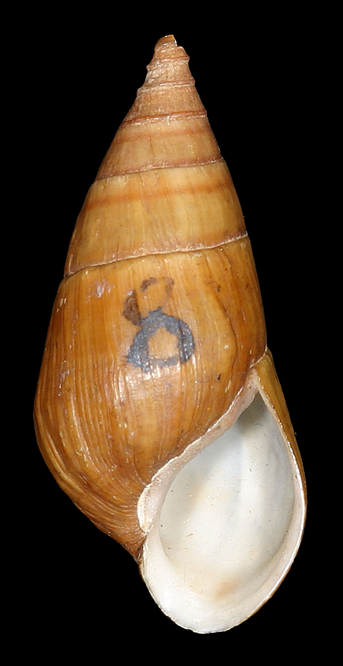
- Lectotype of Elimia cahawbensis (USNM 119055)

Conservation status
- Least Concern (IUCN 3.1)

- Apparently Secure (NatureServe)

Scientific classification
- Kingdom: Animalia
- Phylum: Mollusca
- Class: Gastropoda
- Subclass: Caenogastropoda
- Order: incertae sedis
- Family: Pleuroceridae
- Genus: Elimia
- Species: E. cahawbensis

Binomial name
- Elimia cahawbensis (I. Lea, 1841)

= Cahaba elimia =

Species of gastropod

The Cahawba elimia (Elimia cahawbensis) is a species of freshwater snail with an operculum, an aquatic gastropod mollusk in the family Pleuroceridae.

This species is endemic to the United States. It is named after Cahaba, Alabama and the Cahaba River.
