= Elimia bellacrenata =

Conservation status
- Critically Endangered (IUCN 3.1)

- Critically Imperiled (NatureServe)

Scientific classification
- Kingdom: Animalia
- Phylum: Mollusca
- Class: Gastropoda
- Subclass: Caenogastropoda
- Order: incertae sedis
- Family: Pleuroceridae
- Genus: Elimia
- Species: E. bellacrenata

Binomial name
- Elimia bellacrenata Haldeman, 1842

Species of freshwater snail

Elimia bellacrenata, the princess elimia, is a brown freshwater snail species belonging to the family Pleuroceridae. E. bellacrenata is a gastropod mollusk, characterized by its operculum, and is found in North American freshwater environments.

== Description ==
Elimia bellacrenata has an elongate, high-spired shell with multiple tightly coiled whorls that taper to a pointed apex. The shell is typically dark brown to black, though some individuals can appear lighter brown. Most Elimia species are small freshwater snails with shells typically about 1–2 cm (0.39–0.79 in) in length.

== Distribution and habitat ==
Elimia bellacrenata is endemic to the state of Alabama, where it is restricted to tributaries of the Cahaba River drainage. It is typically found in freshwater environments with flowing water systems, such as springs and small streams. Like other members of the genus Elimia, it is associated with flowing water habitats with clean and oxygenated conditions on firm substrates such as rock or gravel.

== Ecology ==
Elimia bellacrenata is a benthic freshwater snail that functions primarily as a grazer, feeding on algae and biofilm (periphyton) on submerged rock surfaces. Like other members of the genus Elimia, it contributes to nutrient cycling and the regulation of algal growth. It may also serve as a food source for fish and other aquatic organisms. This species exhibits direct development, with embryos developing within egg capsules and hatching as small juveniles rather than passing through a free-swimming larval stage.

== Conservation status ==
Elimia bellacrenata is classified as critically imperiled by NatureServe due to its restricted range within the Cahaba River drainage of Alabama. Many species in the genus Elimia are sensitive to environmental disturbance, including sedimentation, declining water quality, and habitat alteration. Because these snails depend on clean, well-oxygenated freshwater habitats, population declines are often associated with broader ecosystem degradation. As a result, species of Elimia are frequently used as indicators of water quality and freshwater ecosystem health.
