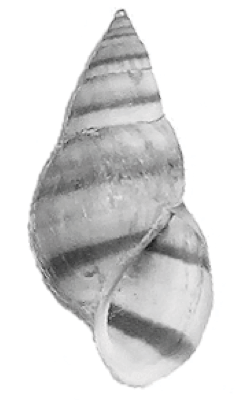
- Apertural view of a shell of Elimia potosiensis

Conservation status
- Least Concern (IUCN 3.1)

- Secure (NatureServe)

Scientific classification
- Kingdom: Animalia
- Phylum: Mollusca
- Class: Gastropoda
- Subclass: Caenogastropoda
- Order: incertae sedis
- Family: Pleuroceridae
- Genus: Elimia
- Species: E. potosiensis

Binomial name
- Elimia potosiensis (I. Lea, 1841)

Synonyms
- Goniobasis cubicoides Call, 1887; Mudalia potosiensis Branson, 1956

= Elimia potosiensis =

Species of gastropod

Elimia potosiensis, common name the pyramid elimia, is a species of freshwater snail with an operculum, an aquatic gastropod mollusk in the family Pleuroceridae.

== Subspecies ==
There are four subspecies:

- Elimia potosiensis potosiensis (I. Lea, 1841)
- Elimia potosiensis crandalli (Pilsbry, 1890)
- Elimia potosiensis ozarkensis (Call, 1886)
- Elimia potosiensis plebeius (Gould, 1851)

== Shell description ==
There is a phenotypic plasticity of shells of Elimia potosiensis:

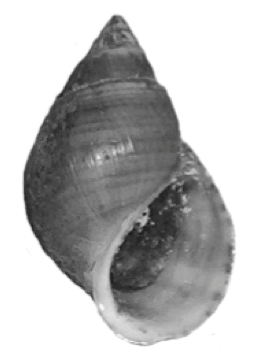
Elimia potosiensis.

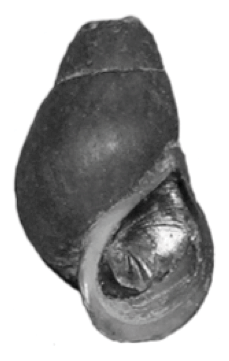
Elimia potosiensis.

== Distribution ==
Elimia potosiensis is native to the United States. It occurs in Arkansas, Kansas, Missouri and in Oklahoma.

== Ecology ==
=== Habitat ===
This snail is found in freshwater springs, streams and rivers.
