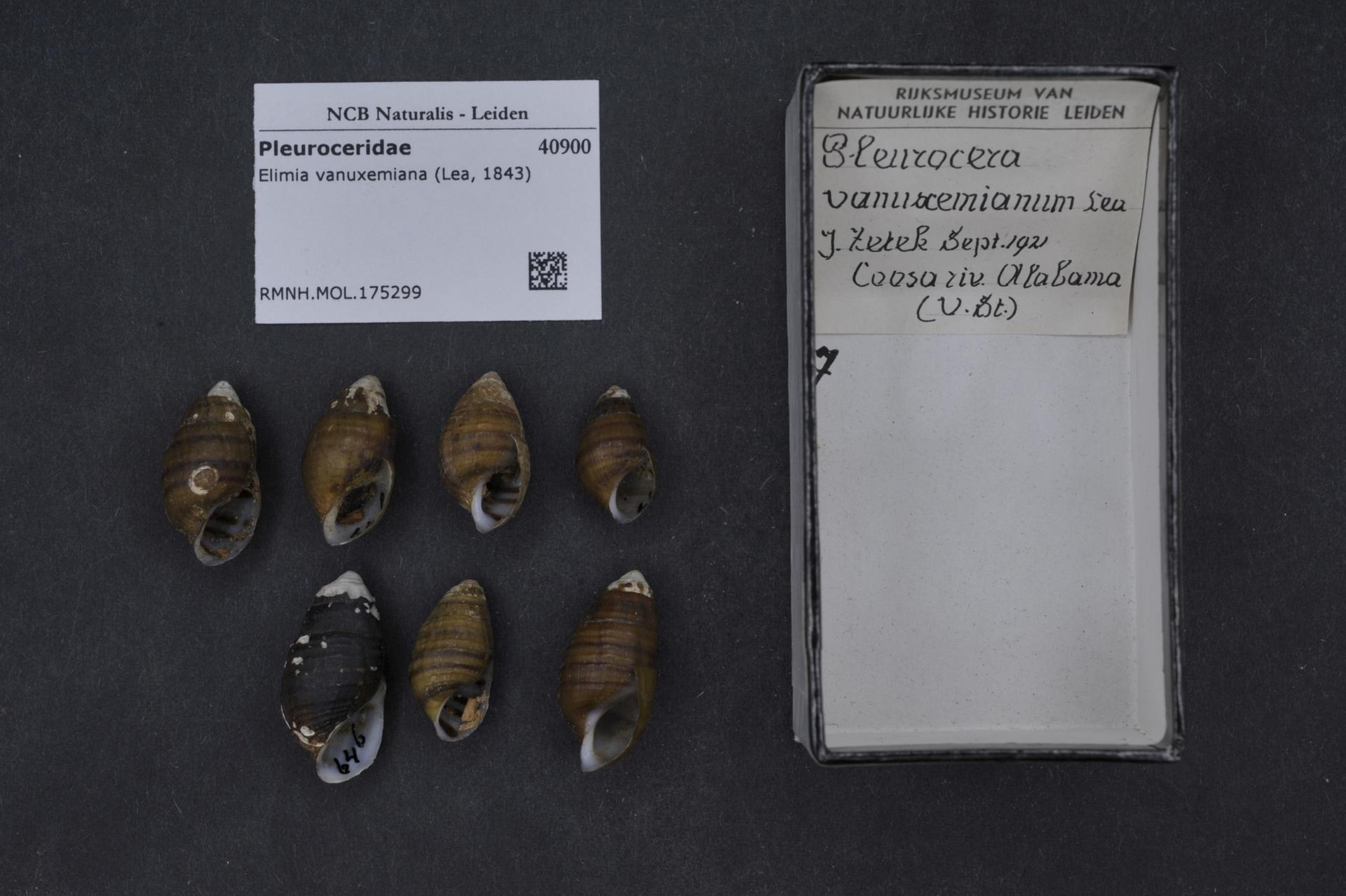

Conservation status
- Extinct (IUCN 3.1)

- Critically Imperiled (NatureServe)

Scientific classification
- Kingdom: Animalia
- Phylum: Mollusca
- Class: Gastropoda
- Subclass: Caenogastropoda
- Order: incertae sedis
- Family: Pleuroceridae
- Genus: Elimia
- Species: †E. vanuxemiana

Binomial name
- †Elimia vanuxemiana I. Lea, 1843

Synonyms
- Goniobasis negata I. Lea, 1862; Melania arctata I. Lea, 1845; Melania pergrata I. Lea, 1861; Melania rubicunda I. Lea, 1861; Melania vanuxemiana I. Lea, 1843; Melania vanuxemiana var. fragosa Reeve, 1861

= Cobble elimia =

Species of gastropod

The cobble elimia, scientific name Elimia vanuxemiana, is a species of freshwater snails, aquatic gilled gastropod molluscs with an operculum in the family Pleuroceridae. This species is endemic to Alabama in the United States.

As of 2000, the species was considered extinct by the IUCN. It was rediscovered in the wild in 2005, but is still considered critically imperiled.
