= Flaxen elimia =

Conservation status
- Vulnerable (IUCN 3.1)

- Imperiled (NatureServe)

Scientific classification
- Kingdom: Animalia
- Phylum: Mollusca
- Class: Gastropoda
- Subclass: Caenogastropoda
- Order: incertae sedis
- Family: Pleuroceridae
- Genus: Elimia
- Species: E. boykiniana

Binomial name
- Elimia boykiniana (I. Lea, 1840)

Synonyms
- Goniobasis boykiniana; Pleurocera boykiniana

Species of freshwater snail

The flaxen elimia, scientific name Elimia boykiniana, is a species of freshwater snail with a gill and an operculum, an aquatic gastropod mollusc in the family Pleuroceridae. This species is endemic to Alabama and Georgia in the United States.
