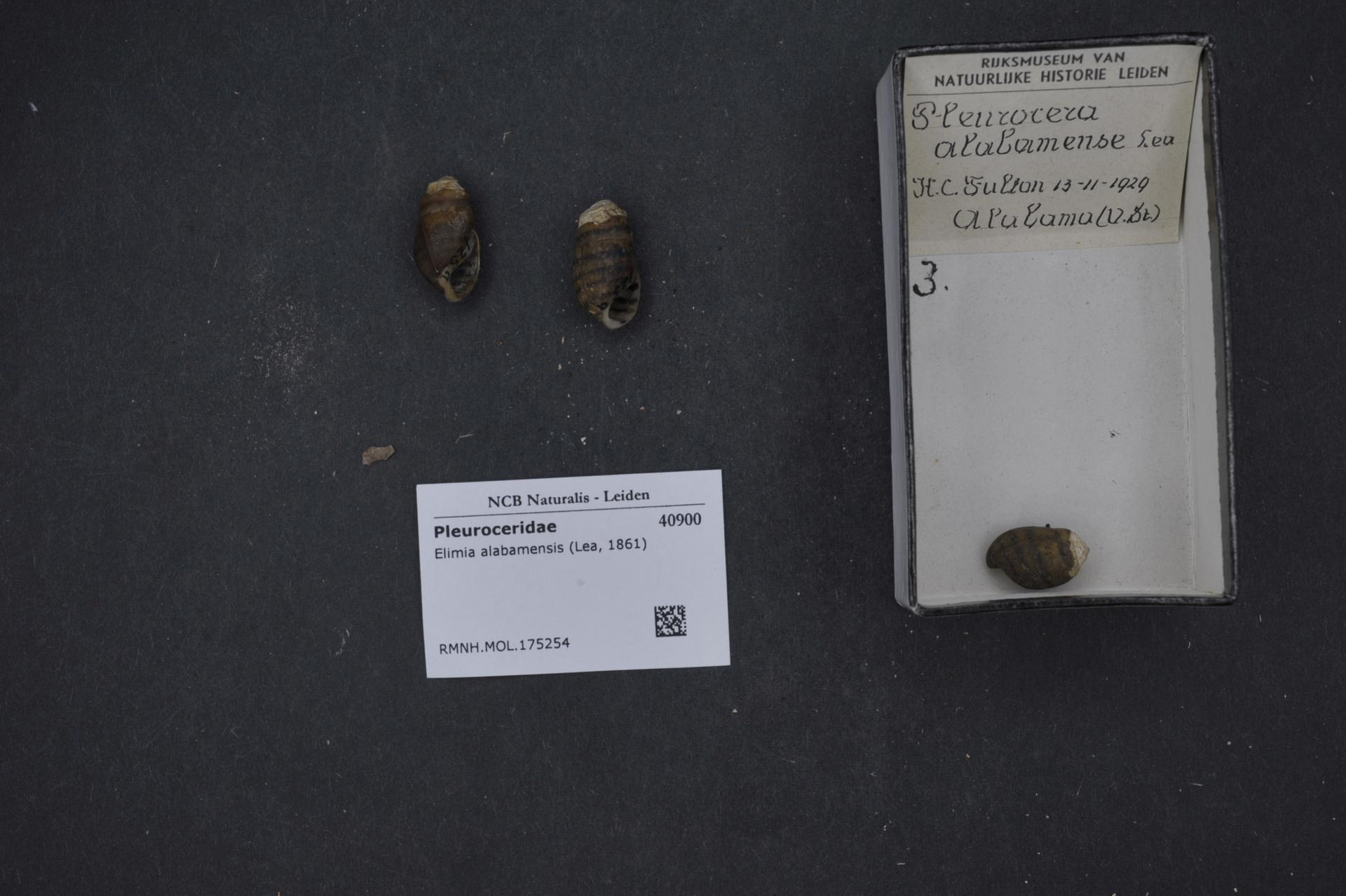

Conservation status
- Vulnerable (IUCN 3.1)

- Critically Imperiled (NatureServe)

Scientific classification
- Kingdom: Animalia
- Phylum: Mollusca
- Class: Gastropoda
- Subclass: Caenogastropoda
- Order: incertae sedis
- Family: Pleuroceridae
- Genus: Elimia
- Species: E. alabamensis

Binomial name
- Elimia alabamensis (I. Lea, 1861)

Synonyms
- Goniobasis osculata I. Lea, 1862; Melania aequa I. Lea, 1861; Melania alabamensis I. Lea, 1861; Melania fallax I. Lea, 1861; Melania pudica I. Lea, 1861; Melania quadrivittata I. Lea, 1861; Melania quadrivittatta I. Lea, 1861; Melania rara I. Lea, 1861; Melatoma babylonicum Reeve, 1860

= Elimia alabamensis =

Species of gastropod

The mud elimia, scientific name Elimia alabamensis, is a species of freshwater snail with a gill and an operculum, a gastropod mollusc in the family Pleuroceridae. This species is endemic to Alabama in the United States.
