= High-spired elimia =

Conservation status
- Extinct (IUCN 2.3)

- Presumed Extinct (NatureServe)

Scientific classification
- Kingdom: Animalia
- Phylum: Mollusca
- Class: Gastropoda
- Subclass: Caenogastropoda
- Order: incertae sedis
- Family: Pleuroceridae
- Genus: Elimia
- Species: †E. hartmaniana

Binomial name
- †Elimia hartmaniana (I. Lea, 1861)

Species of gastropod

The high-spired elimia (Elimia hartmaniana) was a species of freshwater snail with an operculum, aquatic gastropod mollusks in the family Pleuroceridae. This species was endemic to the United States. It is now extinct.
