= Fusiform elimia =

Conservation status
- Extinct (IUCN 3.1)

- Presumed Extinct (NatureServe)

Scientific classification
- Kingdom: Animalia
- Phylum: Mollusca
- Class: Gastropoda
- Subclass: Caenogastropoda
- Order: incertae sedis
- Family: Pleuroceridae
- Genus: Elimia
- Species: †E. fusiformis

Binomial name
- †Elimia fusiformis I. Lea, 1861

Species of gastropod

The fusiform elimia (Elimia fusiformis) was a species of freshwater snail with an operculum, aquatic gastropod mollusks in the family Pleuroceridae. This species was endemic to the United States. It is now extinct.
