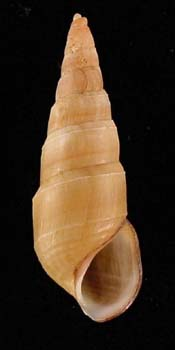

Conservation status
- Secure (NatureServe)

Scientific classification
- Kingdom: Animalia
- Phylum: Mollusca
- Class: Gastropoda
- Subclass: Caenogastropoda
- Order: incertae sedis
- Family: Pleuroceridae
- Genus: Elimia
- Species: E. virginica

Binomial name
- Elimia virginica (Say, 1817)

= Elimia virginica =

Species of gastropod

Elimia virginica, common names the Piedmont elimia or Virginia river snail, is a species of freshwater snail with an operculum, an aquatic gastropod mollusc in the family Pleuroceridae.

== Distribution ==
=== Indigenous distribution ===
Elimia virginica is native to the United States east of the continental divide. The species occurs in large Atlantic coast rivers in eastern North America, from Massachusetts to Virginia. The northeastern limit of the native range of the species is the lower Connecticut River.

The distribution of this species is shrinking in the native Connecticut River, and it is considered rare in Connecticut. Its conservation status in the Connecticut River Watershed is W1 ("a rare species, with 20 or fewer known occurrences in the watershed states").

The conservation status of Elimia virginica according to NatureServe, is as follows:

- United States of America – secure.
  - Massachusetts – presumed extirpated.
  - Connecticut – critically imperiled.
  - New York – vulnerable.
  - New Jersey – unranked.
  - Pennsylvania – secure.
  - Virginia – apparently secure.
  - North Carolina – unrankable.

=== Nonindigenous distribution ===
The nonindigenous distribution of Elimia virginica includes another area in the United States: it migrated from the Atlantic drainage through the Erie Canal to the Lake Ontario drainage.

The first record of this species in the Great Lakes drainage dates from around 1856–1860, when it was found in the Erie Canal near Mohawk, New York State. Populations later increased throughout the canal in the late 19th century, and reached Buffalo, at the mouth of Lake Erie. In the 1960s, this species was recorded from Oneida Lake in New York State.

This species is considered established in the Lake Ontario drainage. However, this species, although introduced to the Lake Ontario drainage, has been largely out-competed by another introduced snail, this one from the Palaearctic ecozone, Bithynia tentaculata. Thus Elimia virginica is now virtually absent from the Oswego drainage, and is possibly very reduced in abundance in other localities where it was introduced, due to such interspecific competition.

There are currently no known impacts caused by introduction of this species to other water bodies.

== Shell description ==
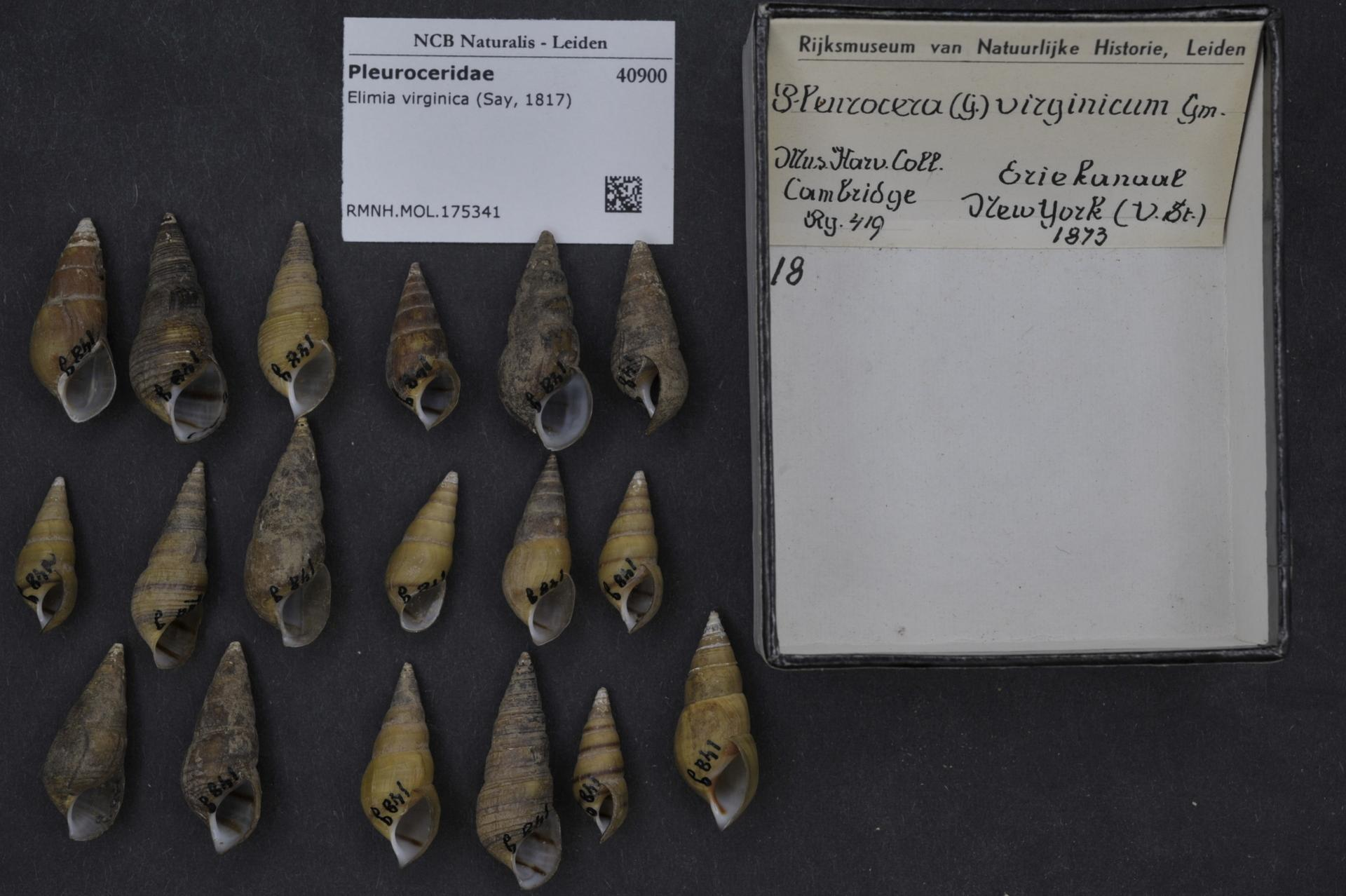
Elimia virginica shells

Elimia virginica belongs to the family Pleuroceridae, a group of snails that have thick, elongated shells. The operculum in this species is proteinaceous, corneous, and paucispiral and is withdrawn when the snail is active.

The shells are dextral and have a very high and narrow spire, with little space in the suture (the incisions between the whorls). This species has two distinct shell morphologies, one smooth and one lirate (i.e. finely lined or grooved).

Specimens of this species often vary in coloration: in general, Elimia virginica is yellow to chestnut in hue, but it sometimes has 2 darker brown spiral bands. Juveniles (snails with an aperture height of no more than 7 mm) display the banding more frequently than adults.

The shells of specimens of Elimia virginica from New York State and the Connecticut River range from 27 to 33 mm high, with an aperture height of 9–12 mm.

== Anatomy ==
It is easy to distinguish the female of this species in whole animals, because of the presence of the external genital sinus.

In 2008. four nucleotide sequences and one protein sequence of Elimia virginica were determined.

== Ecology ==
=== Habitat ===
Elimia virginica is found in freshwater rivers and streams with cobble bottoms and boulders. (Pleurocerids are usually found in lotic erosional environments, in riffles or shoals with rock or sand substrate, and especially frequently on rocks in slower areas of medium size reaches.) Elimia virginica usually inhabits slow to medium velocity rivers and streams with firm and clean gravel, cobble and rock substrate. Pleurocerids in general are sensitive to abiotic stresses, and Elimia virginica is not tolerant to siltation.

In Connecticut, Elimia virginica is at the edge of its range, and is most likely limited to hard water habitats only. During collections made in the Connecticut River, the snail was found to inhabit regions with water temperatures up to 27.5 °C, dissolved oxygen between 7 and 14 ppm, CaCO_{3} concentration from 42 to 160 ppm, pH from 7.6 to 9.0 and CO_{2} concentration from 0–10 ppm. However, at some of these sites, population abundance was very low and/or decreasing, especially in conditions of high water temperature and alkalinity.

=== Life cycle ===
Elimia virginica is dioecious. It lays its eggs from spring to summer, in particular in June and July.

This species, unlike softer shelled physid snails, grows very slowly, and has the lowest intrinsic rate of increase (this means that populations grow very slowly), along with Leptoxis carinata, in this environment.

Individuals of this species are often sexually mature within one year; and can live 5 years.

=== Feeding habits ===
Elimia virginica is grazer of epilithic periphyton.

=== Parasites ===
Trematodes are often parasitic in reproductive organs of this species. Parasites of Elimia virginica include trematode Aspidogaster conchicola.

=== Other interspecific relationships ===
In the Connecticut River, the shell of Elimia virginica is often used as substrate by epizootic algae and the entoproct Urnatella gracilis.

A short study in the Potomac River, Virginia, found that the snail has a very strong shell that is adapted to withstand predation by such predators as crayfish and ducks. However, there is an evolutionary trade-off between predator defense and rapid growth and reproduction amongst snail populations found in this river.

There is recent evidence for hybridisation (the process of creating intermediate forms called hybrids during interspecific breeding) and introgression between Elimia virginica and Elimia livescens amongst populations brought into contact due to the opening of the Erie Canal. These two species were formerly completely geographically isolated during glaciation by the Alleghenian Divide: the former was only found in Atlantic Slope drainages, while the latter was only found in Interior Basin drainages. Hybridization and introgression of this kind can put the genetic integrity of a species at severe risk, especially when the population is already small.
