= Pupa elimia =

Conservation status
- Extinct (IUCN 2.3)

- Presumed Extinct (NatureServe)

Scientific classification
- Kingdom: Animalia
- Phylum: Mollusca
- Class: Gastropoda
- Subclass: Caenogastropoda
- Order: incertae sedis
- Family: Pleuroceridae
- Genus: Elimia
- Species: †E. pupaeformis

Binomial name
- †Elimia pupaeformis (I. Lea, 1864)

Species of gastropod

The pupa elimia (Elimia pupaeformis) was a species of freshwater snail with an operculum, an aquatic gastropod mollusk in the family Pleuroceridae. This species was endemic to the United States; it is now extinct.
