= Closed elimia =

Conservation status
- Extinct (IUCN 3.1)

- Presumed Extinct (NatureServe)

Scientific classification
- Kingdom: Animalia
- Phylum: Mollusca
- Class: Gastropoda
- Subclass: Caenogastropoda
- Order: incertae sedis
- Family: Pleuroceridae
- Genus: Elimia
- Species: †E. clausa

Binomial name
- †Elimia clausa I. Lea, 1861

Species of gastropod

The closed elimia, scientific name †Elimia clausa, was a species of gastropod in the family Pleuroceridae. It was endemic to the United States. It is now extinct.
