= Elimia strigosa =

Conservation status
- Vulnerable (IUCN 2.3)

- Imperiled (NatureServe)

Scientific classification
- Kingdom: Animalia
- Phylum: Mollusca
- Class: Gastropoda
- Subclass: Caenogastropoda
- Order: incertae sedis
- Family: Pleuroceridae
- Genus: Elimia
- Species: E. strigosa

Binomial name
- Elimia strigosa I. Lea, 1841

Species of gastropod

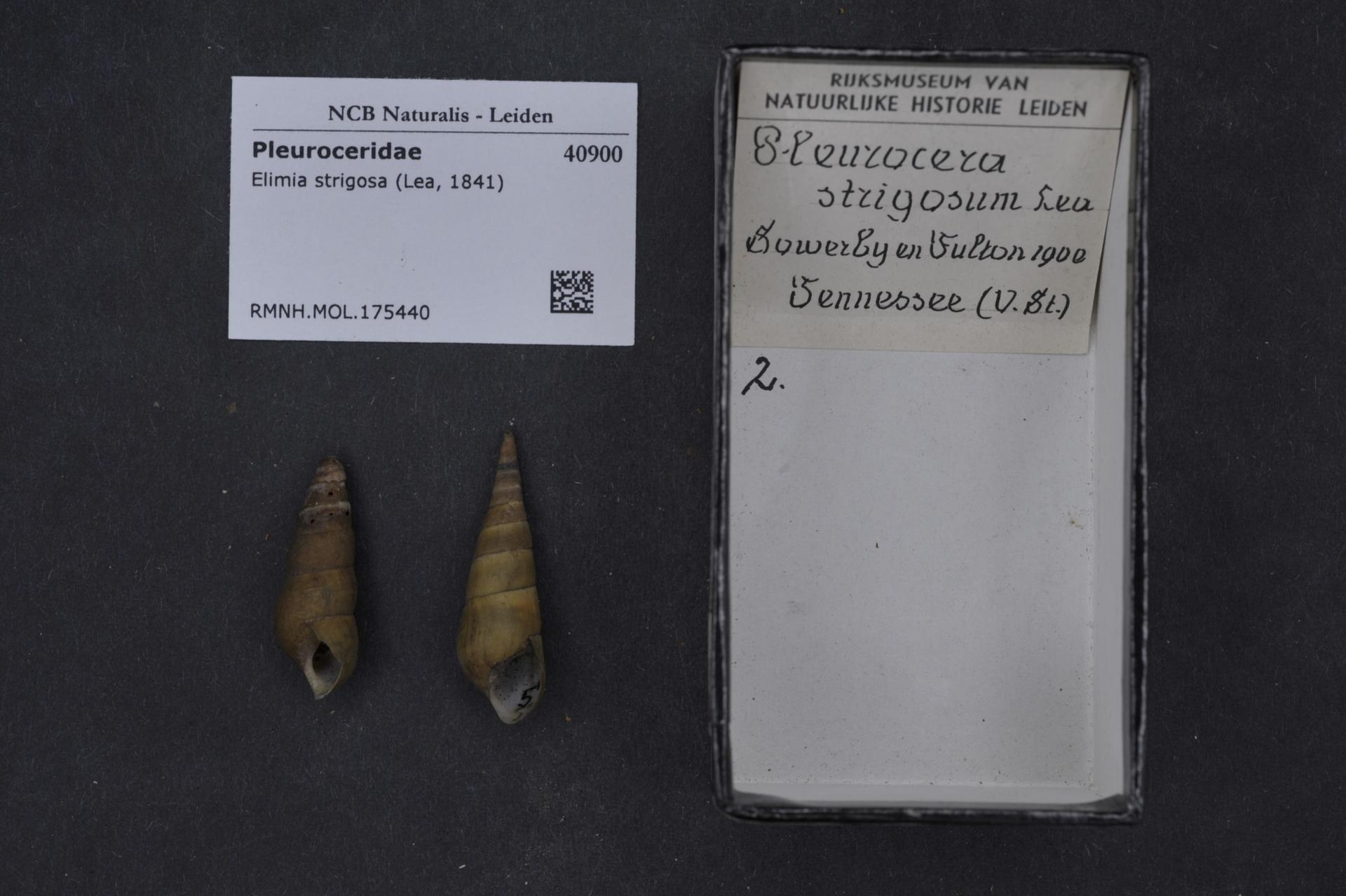
Elimia strigosa (Lea, 1841)

Elimia strigosa is a species of freshwater snail with an operculum, aquatic gastropod mollusk in the family Pleuroceridae. This species is endemic to the United States.
