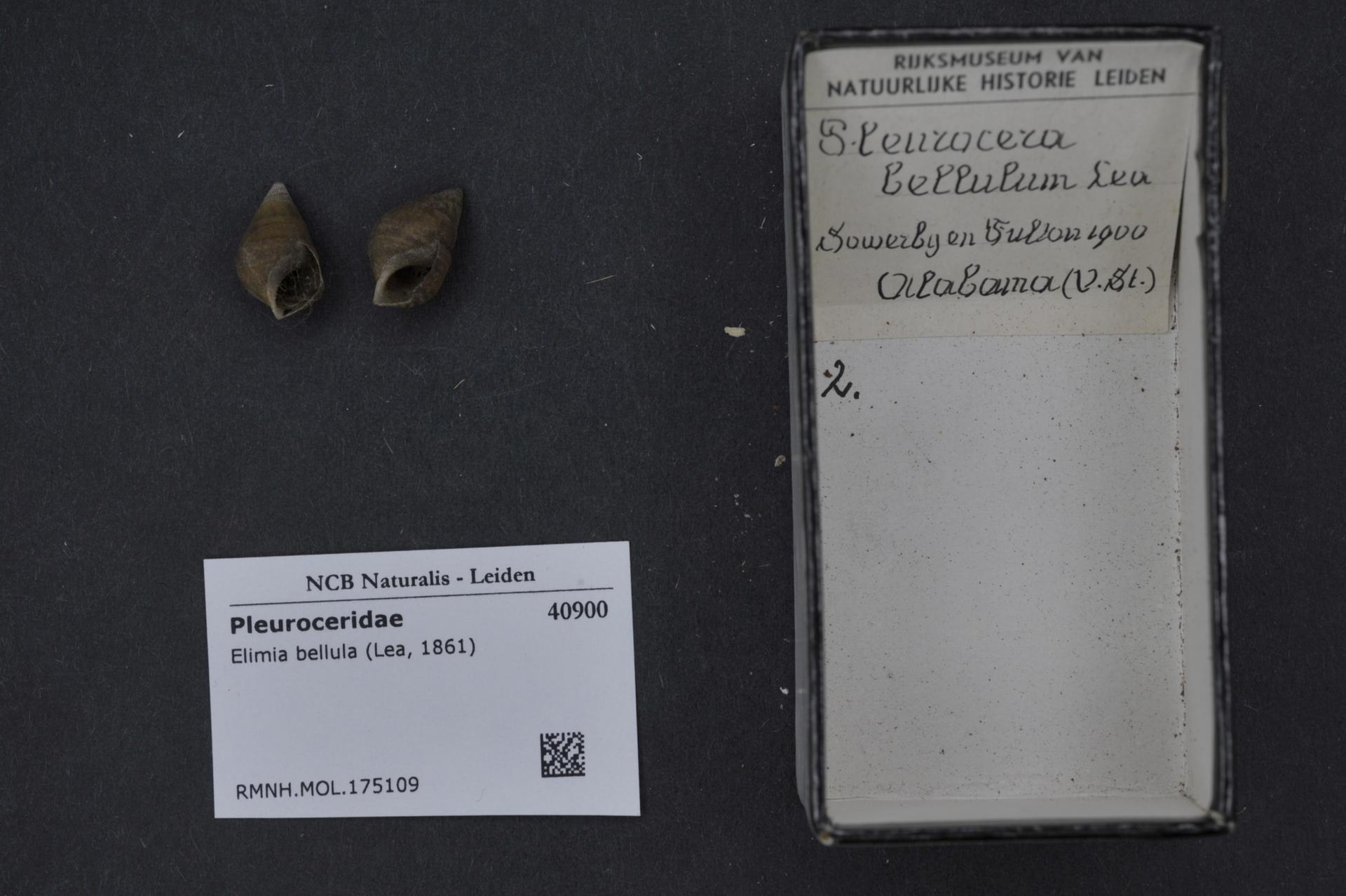
- Shells of elimia bellula (Lea, 1861)

Conservation status
- Endangered (IUCN 3.1)

- Critically Imperiled (NatureServe)

Scientific classification
- Kingdom: Animalia
- Phylum: Mollusca
- Class: Gastropoda
- Subclass: Caenogastropoda
- Order: incertae sedis
- Family: Pleuroceridae
- Genus: Elimia
- Species: E. bellula

Binomial name
- Elimia bellula I. Lea, 1861

= Walnut elimia =

Species of gastropod

The Walnut elimia (Elimia bellula) is a species of freshwater snail with an operculum, an aquatic gastropod mollusk in the family Pleuroceridae. This species is endemic to the United States, and is named after the Walnut River, in Kansas.
