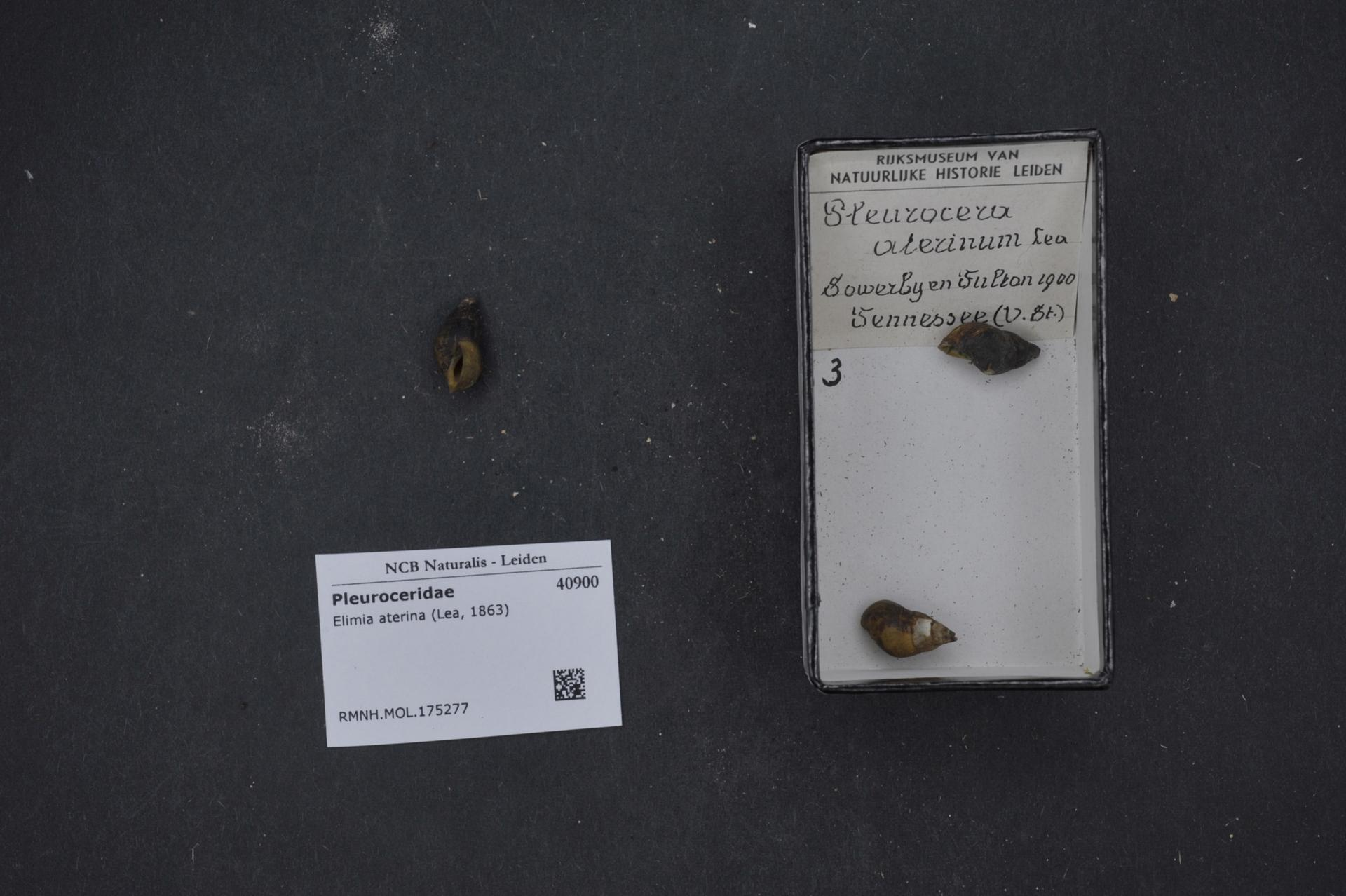

Conservation status
- Vulnerable (IUCN 2.3)

- Imperiled (NatureServe)

Scientific classification
- Kingdom: Animalia
- Phylum: Mollusca
- Class: Gastropoda
- Subclass: Caenogastropoda
- Order: incertae sedis
- Family: Pleuroceridae
- Genus: Elimia
- Species: E. aterina

Binomial name
- Elimia aterina I. Lea, 1863

= Elimia aterina =

Species of gastropod

Elimia aterina is a species of freshwater snails with an operculum, aquatic gastropod mollusks in the family Pleuroceridae. This species is endemic to the United States.
