= Silt elimia =

Conservation status
- Vulnerable (IUCN 2.3)

- Vulnerable (NatureServe)

Scientific classification
- Kingdom: Animalia
- Phylum: Mollusca
- Class: Gastropoda
- Subclass: Caenogastropoda
- Order: incertae sedis
- Family: Pleuroceridae
- Genus: Elimia
- Species: E. haysiana

Binomial name
- Elimia haysiana I. Lea, 1843

Species of gastropod

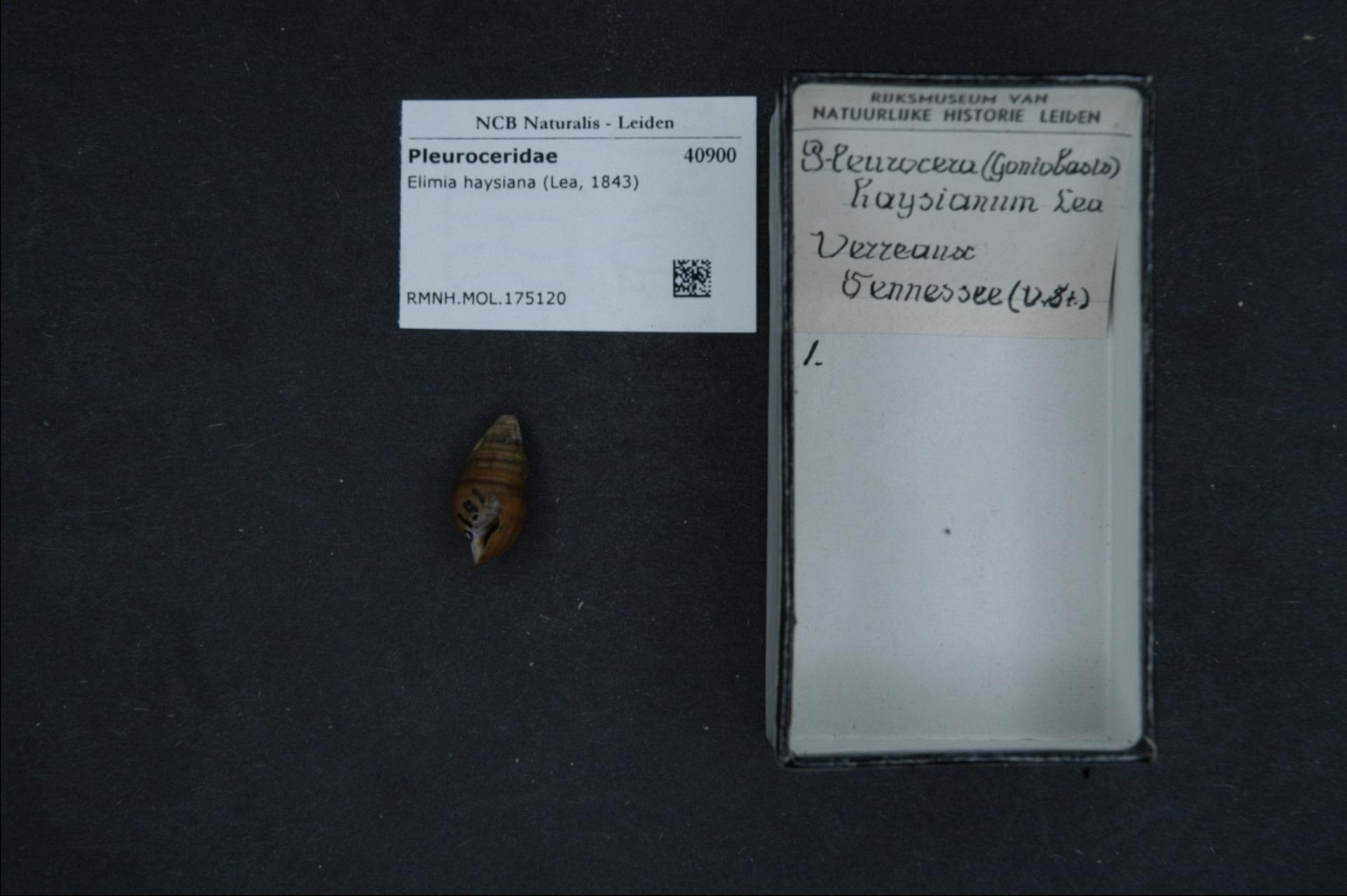
A close up of a mollusc shell

The silt elimia (Elimia haysiana) is a species of freshwater snail with an operculum, an aquatic gastropod mollusks in the family Pleuroceridae. This species is endemic to the United States.
