= Pygmy elimia =

Conservation status
- Extinct (IUCN 2.3)

- Presumed Extinct (NatureServe)

Scientific classification
- Kingdom: Animalia
- Phylum: Mollusca
- Class: Gastropoda
- Subclass: Caenogastropoda
- Order: incertae sedis
- Family: Pleuroceridae
- Genus: Elimia
- Species: †E. pygmaea

Binomial name
- †Elimia pygmaea (H. H. Smith, 1936)

Species of gastropod

The pygmy elimia, scientific name †Elimia pygmaea, was a species of freshwater snail with a gill and an operculum, an aquatic gastropod mollusk in the family Pleuroceridae. This species was endemic to the United States. It is now extinct.
