= Round-rib elimia =

Conservation status
- Vulnerable (IUCN 2.3)

- Critically Imperiled (NatureServe)

Scientific classification
- Kingdom: Animalia
- Phylum: Mollusca
- Class: Gastropoda
- Subclass: Caenogastropoda
- Order: incertae sedis
- Family: Pleuroceridae
- Genus: Elimia
- Species: E. nassula

Binomial name
- Elimia nassula Conrad, 1834

Species of gastropod

The round-rib elimia, scientific name Elimia nassula, is a species of freshwater snail with an operculum, an aquatic gastropod mollusks in the family Pleuroceridae. This species is endemic to the United States.
