= Elimia lachryma =

Conservation status
- Extinct (IUCN 3.1)

- Critically Imperiled (NatureServe)

Scientific classification
- Kingdom: Animalia
- Phylum: Mollusca
- Class: Gastropoda
- Subclass: Caenogastropoda
- Order: incertae sedis
- Family: Pleuroceridae
- Genus: Elimia
- Species: †E. lachryma

Binomial name
- †Elimia lachryma (Reeve, 1861)

Species of gastropod

Elimia lachryma, the teardrop elimia or nodulose Coosa River snail is a species of freshwater snail with an operculum, an aquatic gastropod mollusc in the family Pleuroceridae. The species is endemic to the State of Alabama in the United States.

As of 2000, the species was considered extinct by the IUCN. It was rediscovered in the wild in 2005, but is still considered critically imperiled.
