= E. laeta =

E. laeta may refer to:

- Elaphe laeta, a rat snake
- Elimia laeta, an extinct snail
- Embelia laeta, a climbing shrub
- Erora laeta, a gossamer-winged butterfly
- Euphydryas laeta, a brush-footed butterfly
- Eurema laeta, an Indian butterfly
- Euryopis laeta, a tangle-web spider
- Euthrix laeta, a snout moth
