= Gladiator elimia =

Conservation status
- Vulnerable (IUCN 3.1)

- Imperiled (NatureServe)

Scientific classification
- Kingdom: Animalia
- Phylum: Mollusca
- Class: Gastropoda
- Subclass: Caenogastropoda
- Order: incertae sedis
- Family: Pleuroceridae
- Genus: Elimia
- Species: E. hydeii

Binomial name
- Elimia hydeii (Conrad, 1834)

Synonyms
- Elimia hydei; Melania hydeii Conrad, 1834; Oxytrema hydei

Species of gastropod

The Gladiator Elimia (Elimia hydeii) is a species of freshwater snail in the family Pleuroceridae. It is an aquatic gastropod mollusc with an operculum. This species is endemic to the Black Warrior River drainage in Alabama, USA.
