= Black mudalia =

Conservation status
- Critically Endangered (IUCN 3.1)

- Imperiled (NatureServe)

Scientific classification
- Kingdom: Animalia
- Phylum: Mollusca
- Class: Gastropoda
- Subclass: Caenogastropoda
- Order: incertae sedis
- Family: Pleuroceridae
- Genus: Elimia
- Species: E. melanoides

Binomial name
- Elimia melanoides (Conrad, 1834)

Synonyms
- Leptoxis melanoides

Species of gastropod

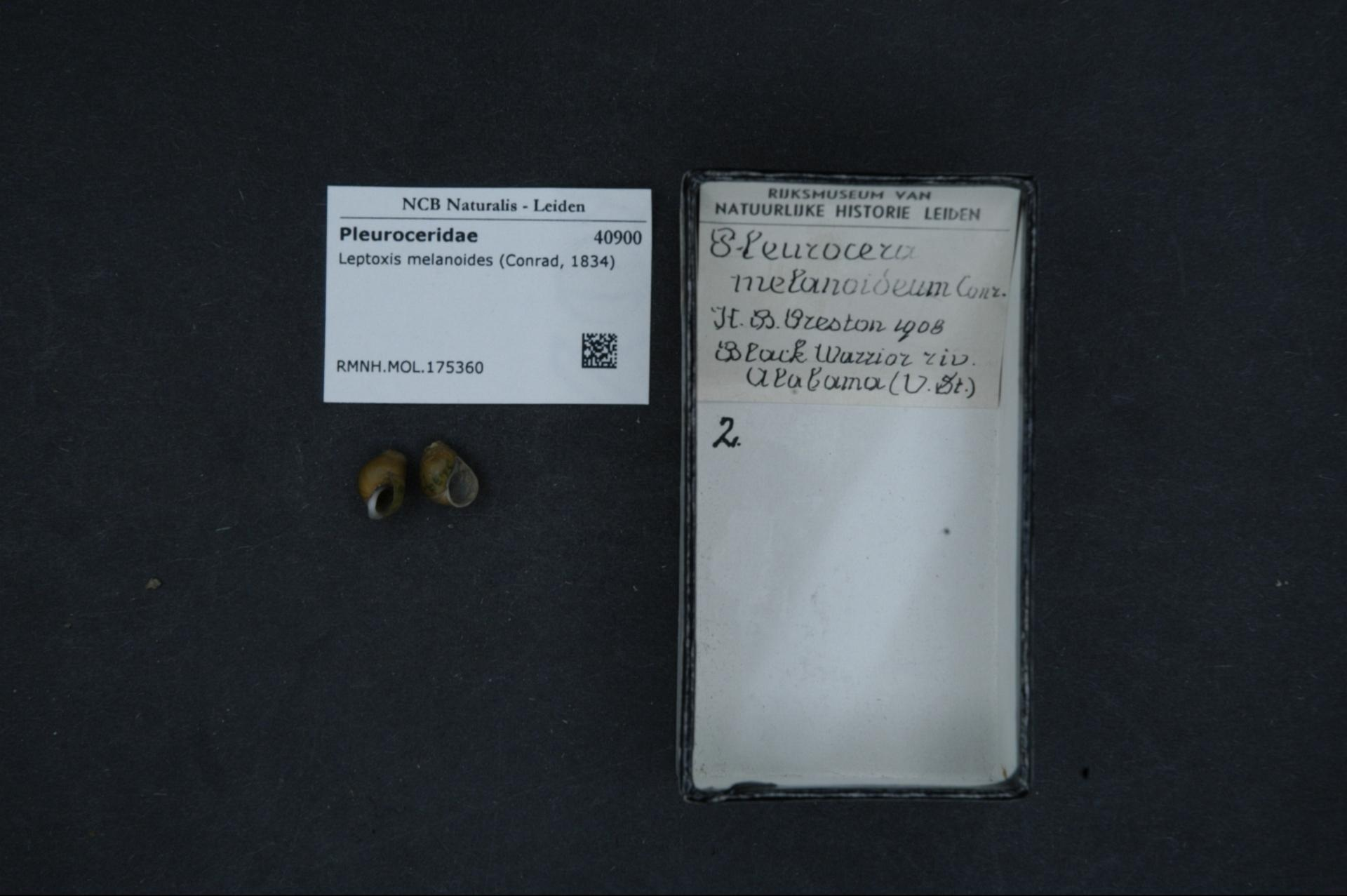
Specimen of black mudalia (Leptoxis melanoides) from the Naturalis Biodiversity Center

The black mudalia (Elimia melanoides) is a species of freshwater snail in the family Pleuroceridae. It is endemic to the Black Warrior River system of Alabama in the United States. It was thought to be extinct until it was rediscovered during a 1996 survey.
