= Pleurocera catenaria =

Scientific classification
- Kingdom: Animalia
- Phylum: Mollusca
- Class: Gastropoda
- Subclass: Caenogastropoda
- Order: incertae sedis
- Family: Pleuroceridae
- Genus: Pleurocera
- Species: P. albanyensis

Binomial name
- Pleurocera albanyensis (Say, 1822)

Synonyms
- Goniobasis catenaria Elimia catenaria (Say, 1822); Pleurocera albanyensis (I. Lea, 1864); Elimia albanyensis (I. Lea, 1864); Pleurocera boykiniana (I. Lea, 1840); Pleurocera caelatura Pleurocera christyi Pleurocera darwini Pleurocera interrupta (Haldeman, 1840); Pleurocera lecontiana Pleurocera mutabilis Pleurocera postelli (I. Lea, 1862); Pleurocera suturalis Pleurocera viennaensis

Species of gastropod

Pleurocera catenaria is a species of freshwater snail with a gill and an operculum, an aquatic gastropod mollusc in the family Pleuroceridae.

This species is endemic to southern Virginia, North Carolina, South Carolina, Tennessee, Georgia.

== Subspecies ==
Subspecies of Pleurocera catenaria include:

- Pleurocera catenaria catenaria (Say, 1822)
- Pleurocera catenaria dislocata (Ravenel, 1834)

== Synonyms ==
Synonyms of Pleurocera catenaria catenaria include:

- Elimia albanyensis, common name black-crest elimia, it was listed as vulnerable species in 1996 and as least concern in 2011.
- Pleurocera boykiniana common name flaxen elimia
- Pleurocera caelatura
- Pleurocera christyi
- Pleurocera darwini
- Pleurocera interrupta,
- Pleurocera lecontiana
- Pleurocera mutabilis
- Pleurocera postelli, common name broken hornsnail
- Pleurocera suturalis
- Pleurocera viennaensis
