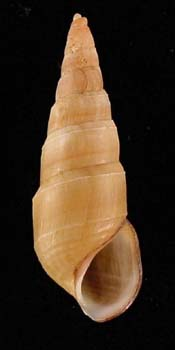
- A shell of Elimia virginica

Scientific classification
- Kingdom: Animalia
- Phylum: Mollusca
- Class: Gastropoda
- Subclass: Caenogastropoda
- Order: incertae sedis
- Superfamily: Cerithioidea
- Family: Pleuroceridae
- Genus: Elimia; H. Adams & A. Adams, 1854

Type species
- Melania acutocarinata

Synonyms
- List: Ambloxus Hannibal, 1912; Goniobasis I. Lea, 1862; Io (Elimia) H. Adams & A. Adams, 1854; Macrolimen I. Lea, 1863; Melania (Goniobasis) I. Lea, 1862; Melania (Melasma) H. Adams & A. Adams, 1854; Melasma H. Adams & A. Adams, 1854

= Elimia =

Elimia Temporal range: 61.7–0 Ma Paleocene to Present

Genus of gastropods

Elimia is a genus of freshwater snails in the family Pleuroceridae. Species of the genus are aquatic gastropod mollusks that have an operculum. Various species are found in creeks throughout much of the eastern and central United States and the Great Lakes region of Canada. Fossils have been found across the whole of the North American continent, including from the Paleocene of Mexico and the Eocene of California. They were formerly included in the genus Goniobasis, together with the western Juga species.

== Species ==
Agatized fossil Elimia shells from Wyoming, United States, sold as "turritella agate"

The following species are recognised in the genus Elimia:

- Elimia acuta (I. Lea, 1831) - acute elimia
- Elimia acutocarinata (I. Lea, 1841) type
- Elimia alabamensis (I. Lea, 1861) - mud elimia
- Elimia albanyensis (I. Lea, 1864) - black-crest elimia
- Elimia ampla (J. G. Anthony, 1854) - ample elimia
- Elimia annae Mihalcik & F. G. Thompson, 2003
- Elimia annettae (Goodrich, 1941) - Lily Shoals elimia
- Elimia arachnoidea (J. G. Anthony, 1854)
- Elimia aterina (I. Lea, 1863) - coal elimia
- Elimia athearni (Clench & R. D. Turner, 1956)
- Elimia bellacrenata (Haldeman, 1842)
- Elimia bellula (I. Lea, 1861) - walnut elimia
- Elimia boykiniana (I. Lea, 1840) - flaxen elimia
- †Elimia brevis (Reeve, 1860) - short-spired elimia
- Elimia broccata F. G. Thompson, 2000
- Elimia buffyae Mihalcik & F. G. Thompson, 2003
- Elimia bullula (I. Lea, 1861)
- Elimia caelatura (Conrad, 1849)
- Elimia caelatura (Reeve, 1860)
- Elimia cahawbensis (I. Lea, 1841) - Cahaba elimia
- Elimia capillaris (I. Lea, 1861) - spindle elimia
- Elimia carinifera (Lamarck, 1822) - sharp-crest elimia
- Elimia carinocostata (I. Lea, 1854)
- Elimia catenaria (Say, 1822)
- Elimia catenoides (I. Lea, 1842)
- Elimia chiltonensis (Goodrich, 1941)
- Elimia christyi (I. Lea, 1862)
- Elimia clara (J. G. Anthony, 1854)
- Elimia clausa (I. Lea, 1861) - closed elimia
- Elimia clavaeformis (I. Lea, 1841)
- Elimia clenchi (Goodrich, 1924)
- Elimia cochliaris (I. Lea, 1868)
- Elimia comalensis (Pilsbry, 1890) - Balcones elimia
- Elimia comma (Conrad, 1834)
- Elimia costifera (Haldeman, 1841)
- Elimia crenatella (I. Lea, 1860) - lacy elimia
- Elimia curreyana (I. Lea, 1841)
- Elimia cylindracea (Conrad, 1834)
- Elimia darwini Mihalcik & F. G. Thompson, 2003
- †Elimia dickersoni B. L. Clark, 1938
- Elimia dickinsoni (Clench & R. D. Turner, 1956)
- Elimia dislocata (Reeve, 1861)
- Elimia doolyensis (I. Lea, 1862)
- Elimia ebenum (I. Lea, 1841)
- Elimia edgariana (I. Lea, 1841)
- Elimia fascinans (I. Lea, 1861) - banded elimia
- Elimia flava (I. Lea, 1862)
- Elimia floridensis (Reeve, 1860)
- Elimia fusiformis (I. Lea, 1861) - fusiform elimia
- Elimia gibbera Goodrich, 1922) - shouldered elimia
- Elimia glarea Mihalcik & F. G. Thompson, 2003
- Elimia godwini F. G. Thompson, 2000
- Elimia hartmaniana (I. Lea, 1861) - high-spired elimia
- Elimia haysiana (I. Lea, 1843) - silt elimia
- Elimia hydeii (Conrad, 1834) - gladiator elimia
- Elimia impressa (I. Lea, 1841) - constricted elimia
- Elimia inclinans (I. Lea, 1862)
- Elimia induta (I. Lea, 1862)
- Elimia interrupta (Haldeman, 1840) - knotty elimia
- Elimia interveniens (I. Lea, 1862) - slowwater elimia
- Elimia jonesi (Goodrich, 1936) - hearty elimia
- Elimia lachryma (Reeve, 1861) - teardrop elimia
- Elimia laeta (Jay, 1839) - ribbed elimia
- Elimia laqueata (Say, 1829)
- Elimia lecontiana (I. Lea, 1841)
- †Elimia lewisiana (C. E. Weaver, 1912)
- Elimia livescens (Menke, 1830) - liver elimia
- Elimia macglameriana (Goodrich, 1936) - Macglamery's Coosa River snail
- Elimia melanoides (Conrad, 1834)
- Elimia mihalcikae F. G. Thompson, 2000
- Elimia modesta (I. Lea, 1862) - coldwater elimia
- Elimia mutabilis (I. Lea, 1862)
- Elimia nassula (Conrad, 1834) - round-rib elimia
- Elimia nitens (I. Lea, 1842)
- †Elimia nodulifera (Meek, 1871)
- Elimia olivula (I. Lea, 1868) - caper elimia
- Elimia ornata (I. Lea, 1868)
- †Elimia packardi (Dickerson, 1915)
- Elimia paupercula (I. Lea, 1862)
- Elimia perstriata (I. Lea, 1852)
- Elimia pilsbryi (Goodrich, 1927) - rough-lined elimia
- Elimia plicatastriata (Wetherby, 1876)
- Elimia porrecta (I. Lea, 1863) - nymph elimia
- Elimia potosiensis (I. Lea, 1841) - pyramid elimia
- Elimia proxima (Say, 1825) - sprite elimia
- Elimia pupaeformis (I. Lea, 1864) - pupa elimia
- Elimia pupoidea (J. G. Anthony, 1854)
- Elimia pybasii (I. Lea, 1862) - spring elimia
- Elimia pygmaea (H.H. Smith, 1936) - pygmy elimia
- †Elimia schencki Clark, 1938
- Elimia semicarinata (Say, 1829)
- Elimia shenandoa (Dillon, 2019)
- Elimia showalteri (I. Lea, 1860) - compact elimia
- Elimia simplex (Say, 1825)
- Elimia striatula (I. Lea, 1842)
- Elimia strigosa (I. Lea, 1841) - brook elimia
- †Elimia subtortuosa (Meek & Hayden, 1857)
- Elimia symmetrica (Haldeman, 1842)
- Elimia taitiana (I. Lea, 1841)
- †Elimia tenera (Hall, 1845)
- Elimia teres (I. Lea, 1841) (elegant elimia)
- Elimia teretria F. G. Thompson, 2000
- Elimia timida (Goodrich, 1942)
- †Elimia trigemmata Conrad, 1860
- Elimia troostiana (I. Lea, 1838) - Mossy elimia
- Elimia ucheensis (I. Lea, 1862)
- Elimia vanhyningiana (Goodrich, 1921)
- Elimia vanuxemiana (I. Lea, 1843) - cobble elimia
- Elimia varians (I. Lea, 1861) - puzzle elimia
- Elimia variata (I. Lea, 1861) - squat elimia
- Elimia viennaensis (I. Lea, 1862)
- Elimia virginica (Gmelin, 1791) - Piedmont elimia
- †Elimia veatchii Gabb, 1864
