= Knotty elimia =

Conservation status
- Vulnerable (IUCN 3.1)

- Critically Imperiled (NatureServe)

Scientific classification
- Kingdom: Animalia
- Phylum: Mollusca
- Class: Gastropoda
- Subclass: Caenogastropoda
- Order: incertae sedis
- Family: Pleuroceridae
- Genus: Elimia
- Species: E. interrupta

Binomial name
- Elimia interrupta (Haldeman, 1840)

Synonyms
- Goniobasis interrupta (Haldeman, 1840); Melania interrupta Haldeman, 1840

Species of mollusc

The knotty elimia, scientific name Elimia interrupta, is a species of freshwater snails with an operculum, aquatic gastropod mollusks in the family Pleuroceridae. This species is endemic to Tennessee in the United States.
