= Elimia gibbera =

Conservation status
- Extinct (IUCN 2.3)

- Presumed Extinct (NatureServe)

Scientific classification
- Kingdom: Animalia
- Phylum: Mollusca
- Class: Gastropoda
- Subclass: Caenogastropoda
- Order: incertae sedis
- Family: Pleuroceridae
- Genus: Elimia
- Species: †E. gibbera

Binomial name
- †Elimia gibbera (Goodrich, 1936)

Synonyms
- Goniobasis gibbera Goodrich, 1936

Species of gastropod

Elimia gibbera, the shouldered elimia, is a species of freshwater snails in the family Pleuroceridae. This species was endemic to Alabama, the United States, with records from the Coosa River. It is now considered extinct, the attributed cause is land-use change. Already in 1936, Calvin Goodrich wrote that "To a large extent, the goniobasic fauna of the Coosa Biver must be spoken of in the past tense".

== Description ==
The shell in adults measures 17–20 mm (0.67–0.79 in) in length and 9–11 mm (0.35–0.43 in) in width.
