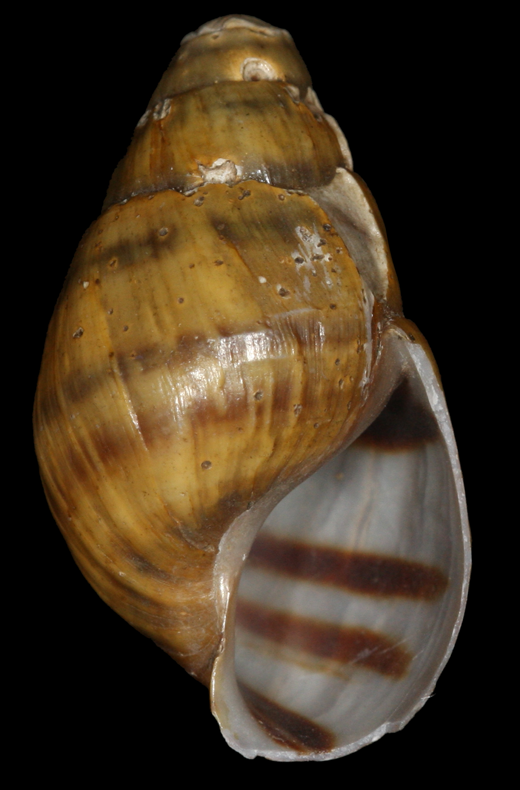
- Lectotype of Elimia ampla (MCZ 161735)

Conservation status
- Critically Endangered (IUCN 3.1)

Scientific classification
- Kingdom: Animalia
- Phylum: Mollusca
- Class: Gastropoda
- Subclass: Caenogastropoda
- Family: Pleuroceridae
- Genus: Elimia
- Species: E. ampla

Binomial name
- Elimia ampla (Anthony, 1854)

Synonyms
- Melania ampla Anthony, 1854 (original combination); Elimia ampla (Anthony, 1854)

= Pleurocera ampla =

Species of gastropod

Elimia ampla, common name ample elimia, is a species of freshwater snail with a gill and an operculum, an aquatic gastropod mollusk in the family Pleuroceridae.

== Distribution ==
This species is endemic to Alabama, United States.

== See also ==
- Leptoxis ampla (Anthony, 1855) is another species with similar scientific name.
