= Hearty elimia =

Conservation status
- Extinct (IUCN 3.1)

- Presumed Extinct (NatureServe)

Scientific classification
- Kingdom: Animalia
- Phylum: Mollusca
- Class: Gastropoda
- Subclass: Caenogastropoda
- Order: incertae sedis
- Family: Pleuroceridae
- Genus: Elimia
- Species: †E. jonesi

Binomial name
- †Elimia jonesi (Goodrich, 1936)

Synonyms
- Goniobasis jonesi Goodrich, 1936

Extinct species of gastropod

The hearty elimia, Elimia jonesi, is an extinct species of freshwater snails in the family Pleuroceridae. This species was endemic to Alabama, the United States, with records from the Coosa River. It is now considered extinct, having not been reported since the river was impounded, despite surveys. The specific name jonesi honors Walter Jones, state geologist of Alabama.

== Description ==
The shell measures 25–31 mm (0.98–1.22 in) in height and 12–16 mm (0.47–0.63 in) in width.
