= Ribbed elimia =

Conservation status
- Extinct (IUCN 2.3)

- Presumed Extinct (NatureServe)

Scientific classification
- Kingdom: Animalia
- Phylum: Mollusca
- Class: Gastropoda
- Subclass: Caenogastropoda
- Order: incertae sedis
- Family: Pleuroceridae
- Genus: Elimia
- Species: †E. laeta

Binomial name
- †Elimia laeta (Jay, 1839)

Species of gastropod

The ribbed elimia, scientific name †Elimia laeta, was a species of freshwater snail with an operculum, aquatic gastropod mollusks in the family Pleuroceridae. This species was endemic to the United States. It is now extinct.
