= Elimia livescens =

- shell of Elimia livescens

Conservation status
- Least Concern (IUCN 3.1)

- Secure (NatureServe)

Scientific classification
- Kingdom: Animalia
- Phylum: Mollusca
- Class: Gastropoda
- Subclass: Caenogastropoda
- Order: incertae sedis
- Family: Pleuroceridae
- Genus: Elimia
- Species: E. livescens

Binomial name
- Elimia livescens (Menke, 1830)

Species of gastropod

shell of Elimia livescens

Elimia livescens, common name the liver elimia, is a species of freshwater snail with an operculum, an aquatic gastropod mollusk in the family Pleuroceridae.

== Shell description ==
The height of the shell of this species can be as large as 20 mm.

== Distribution ==
Elimia livescens is native to the United States. It occurs in the Saint Lawrence River drainage from Great Lake to Lake Champlain; in tributaries of the Ohio River east of the Scioto River in Ohio; and in the Wabash River, west to the Illinois River.

The nonindigenous distribution of Elimia livescens includes the lower Hudson River drainage. It migrated to the Hudson River via the Erie Canal. The impact of this introduction is unknown.

== Ecology ==
=== Habitat ===
This snail is found in freshwater rivers and streams, on rock shoals and gravel bars.

=== Life cycle ===
The sexes are separate. Eggs are usually laid in the spring. The snails often reach sexual maturity in a year, and can live for 5 years.

=== Parasites ===
Parasites of Elimia livescens include trematode Aspidogaster conchicola.
