= Lardner Vanuxem =

American geologist

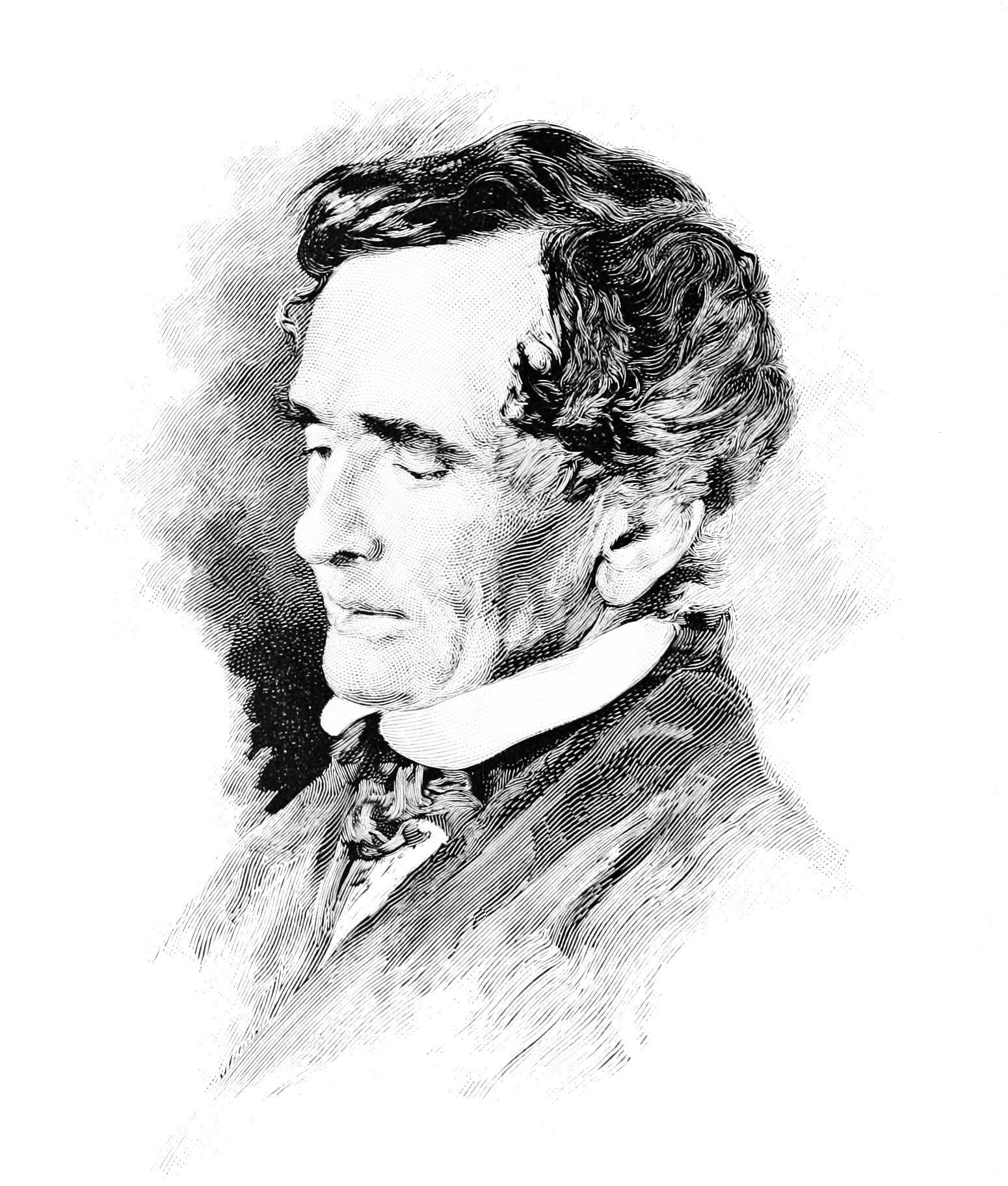
- Born: July 23, 1792; Philadelphia, Pennsylvania
- Died: January 25, 1848 (aged 55); Bristol, Pennsylvania
- Education: Ecole des mines, Paris
- Scientific career
- Fields: Geology

Lardner Vanuxem (July 23, 1792 – January 25, 1848) was an American geologist. He graduated at the Ecole des mines, Paris, in 1819. After his education, he became the Chair of Chemistry and Mineralogy at South Carolina College in Columbia, South Carolina. In 1826 he retired from the college and devoted his attention exclusively to geology as a profession. During that year he published in newspapers and in Robert Mills' "Statistics of South Carolina" report on the geology of the state.

He visited Mexico to examine mining property. From 1827 to 1828, he studied the geological features of the states of New York, Ohio, Kentucky, Tennessee, and Virginia, under the auspices of the state of New York, and made his report to its legislature. On the establishment of the geological survey of New York in 1836, Professor Vanuxem was assigned to the charge of the 3d geological district, and continued in the active work of the survey until 1841.

At the close of the survey he spent some time in Albany arranging the state geological cabinet, out of which grew the New York State Museum. Professor Vanuxem's private collection of mineral and geological specimens was considered at the time of his death to be "the largest, best arranged, and most valuable private collection in the country." He was a member of the Philadelphia Academy of Natural Sciences and a member of the American Philosophical Society (1822).

Vanuxem saw the need for a uniform system of nomenclature in the United States which led him to form a collaborative group that in 1847 became the American Association for the Advancement of Science.

Vanuxem was an intensely religious man. Raised in the Presbyterian Church, he abstained from alcohol and tobacco and was a strong advocate of human rights. He also advocated women's equality. Lardner married Mary Ann Newbold in 1831, and they had seven children.

== Publications ==
- Geology of New York, 3d District (Albany, 1842)
- He wrote numerous papers on scientific subjects in the American Journal of Science
- Catalogue of the Cabinet of Natural History of the State of New York, and of the Historical and ... (1853)
- An Essay on the Ultimate Principles of Chemistry, Natural Philosophy, and Physiology (Philadelphia, 1827)
- Account of the jeffersonite, a new mineral discovered at the Franklin Iron Works, near Sparta, in New Jersey with W.H. Keating. Academy of Natural Sciences, Philadelphia Journal, vol. 2, pages 194–204 (1822)
- On a new locality of the automolite, Academy of Natural Sciences, Philadelphia Journal, vol. 2, pages 249–251 (1822)

== Sources ==
- Pioneers of Science in America By William Jay Youmans, page 270 ISBN 978-1-4325-5268-8
