= Cahaba River =

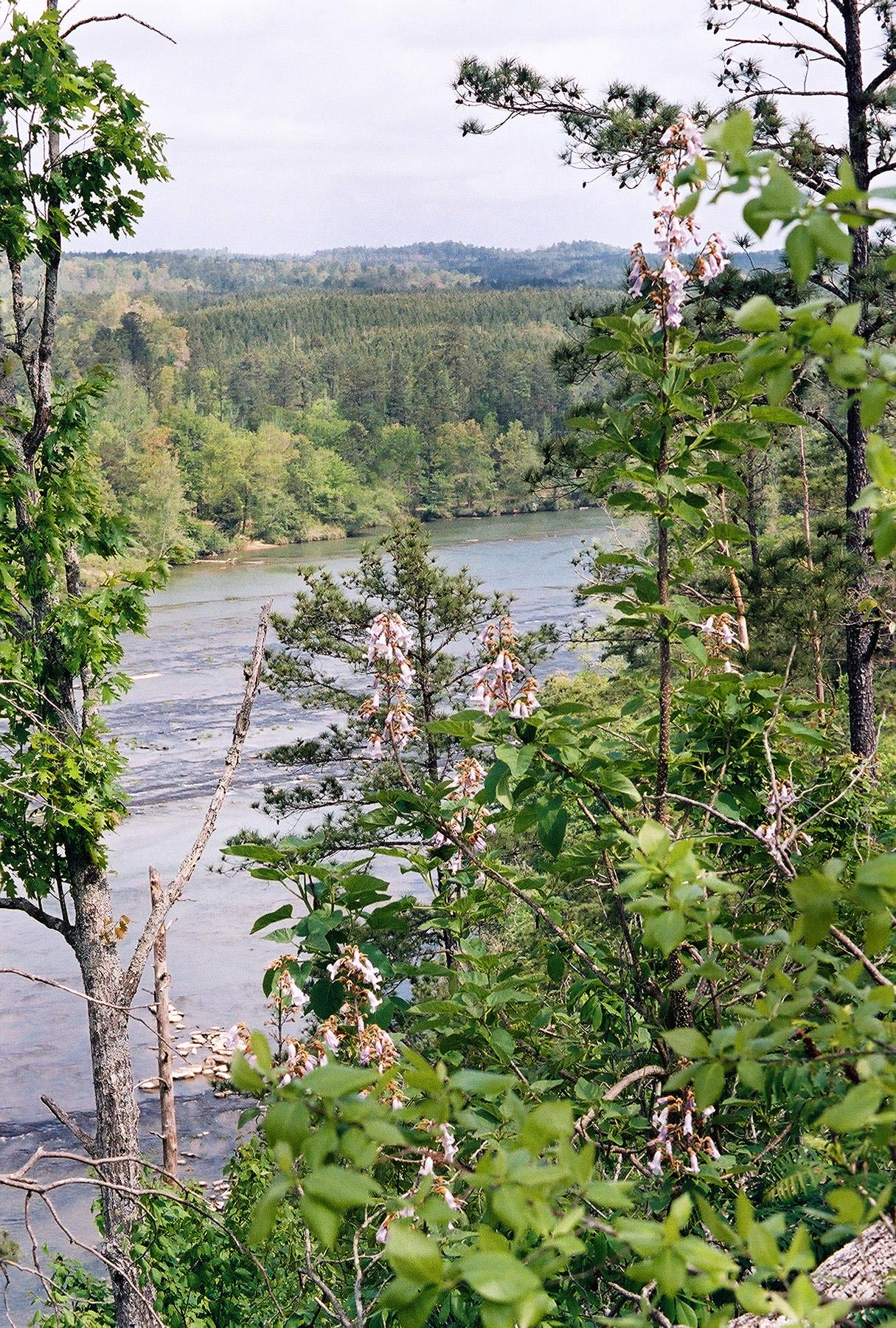

Location
- Country: United States
- State: Alabama

Physical characteristics
- Source
  - location: Jefferson County, Alabama
  - coordinates: 33°41′15″N 86°36′0″W
- Mouth: Alabama River
  - location: Dallas County, Alabama
  - coordinates: 32°19′9″N 87°05′41″W
- Length: 194 mi (312 km)
- Basin size: 1,870 mi^{2} (4,800 km^{2})

Basin features
- Progression: Alabama → Mobile → Gulf of Mexico
- Tributaries
  - left: (numerous)
  - right: (numerous)

The Cahaba River is the longest substantially free-flowing river in Alabama. It is a major tributary of the Alabama River and part of the larger Mobile River basin. With headwaters near Birmingham, the Cahaba flows southwest, then at Heiberger turns southeast and joins the Alabama River at the ghost town and former Alabama capital of Cahaba in Dallas County. Entirely within central Alabama, the Cahaba River is 194 miles (312 km) long and drains an area of 1,870 square miles (4,800 km^{2}). The name Cahaba is derived from the Choctaw words oka meaning "water" and aba meaning "above"

== Geography ==
The Cahaba River flows across three physiographic provinces of the state: Appalachian Plateau, Ridge and Valley, and Coastal Plain. The Mobile River basin has the largest Gulf Coast drainage basin east of the Mississippi River, and the Cahaba is one of the seven river systems that contribute to its flow. The mean discharge of water from 1938 to 2000 is about 80 m^{3}/s. The average rainfall is 138 cm/yr. The terrestrial biome of the river is classified as eastern deciduous forest.

== Course ==
The Cahaba River begins in the Valley and Ridge region bounded by the Piedmont to the southeast and the Cumberland Plateau to the northwest. It has two major physical regions: Upper and Lower Cahaba. The river empties into the Alabama River. The upper Cahaba forms roughly the first 100 miles, starting at the headwaters and continuing to the Fall Line, a region in which the Appalachian Mountains end and the Gulf Coastal Plain begins. It passes through Trussville, Leeds, Irondale, Birmingham, Mountain Brook, Hoover, Vestavia, Helena, West Blocton, and Centreville. The lower Cahaba begins at the fall line and continues through Selma and empties into the Alabama River at the former town of Cahaba.

== History ==
=== Precolonization ===
Located adjacent to the Cahaba River basin, the Moundville Archaeological Site (1000–1450 AD) was the second-largest community of the Mississippian culture. The Black Warrior River and the Cahaba River run parallel to each other for over 100 miles, often as close as 30 miles apart. The Bottle Creek Site (1250–1550 AD), located little more than 100 miles downriver in the Mobile-Tensaw River Delta, also influenced the region. A large mound remains on the river, just south of Centerville. A large village occupied the town of Cahaba site from 100 to 1550 AD, during the Woodland and Mississippian periods.

=== The town of Cahaba ===
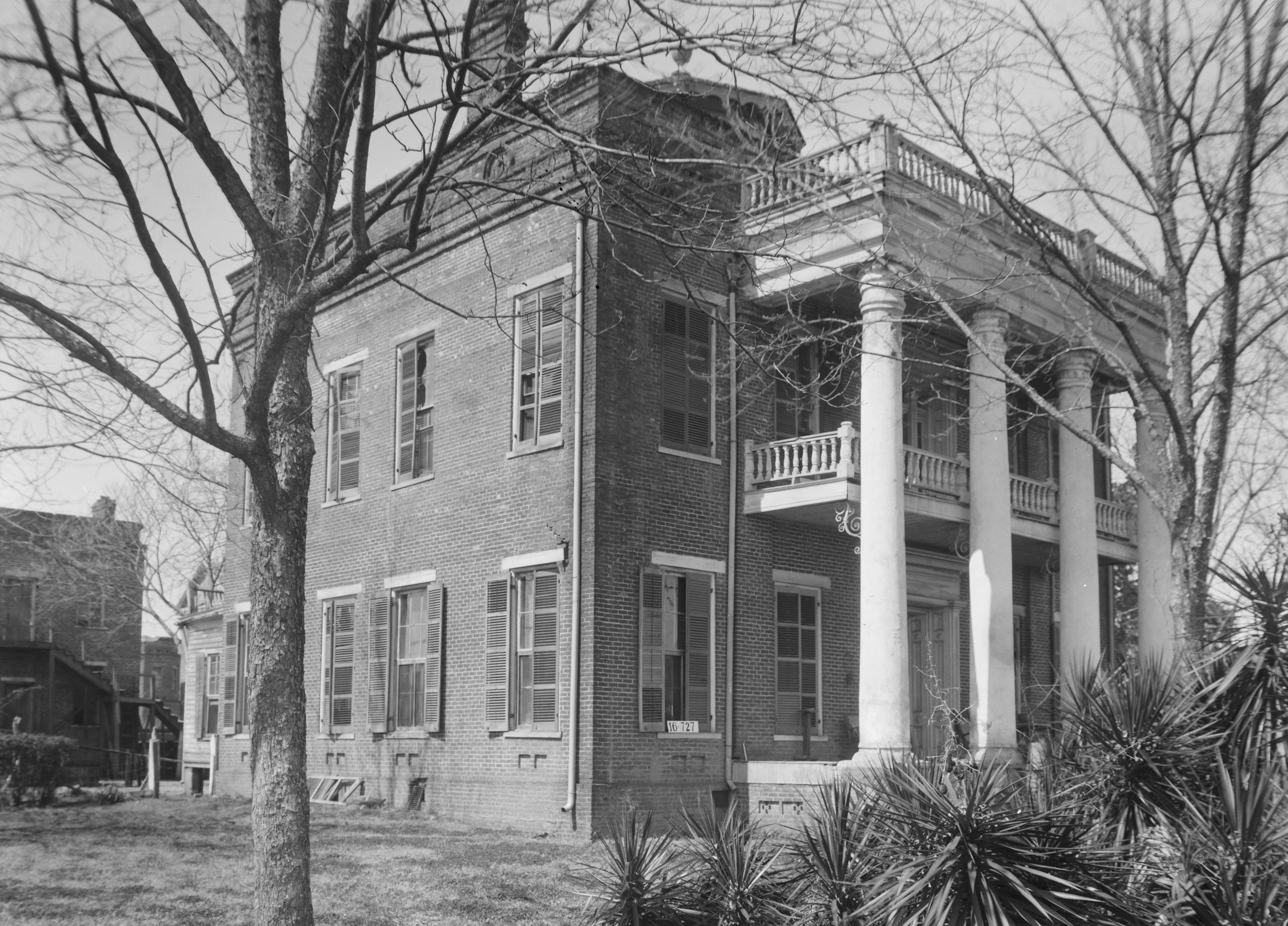
The Kirkpatrick Mansion at Cahaba: One of the last houses remaining in the town when this photograph was taken in 1934, it was destroyed by fire the following year.

The Cahaba River ends at the former town of Cahaba, also known as Cahawba, or Old Cahawba. The town of Cahaba was Alabama's first seat of government from 1820 to 1825. William Wyatt Bibb, Alabama's first governor, decided on Cahaba because of the scenery, fertile area, and navigable river ways. Cahaba suffered harsh economic struggles and disease from 1819 to 1822. However, in 1821, a steamboat, the Harriet, overcame the Alabama River's fast current and made it past Cahaba. The river became a major trade route, which caused the city to grow, despite the removal of the capital to Tuscaloosa in 1825. Cahaba is now an abandoned town and a state historical site, administered by the Alabama Historical Commission.

== Geology ==
The Ridge and Valley region of Alabama, which is where the Cahaba River begins, was formed when the African Plate collided with the North American Plate in the Paleozoic era. The valley soils consist of gravel, sand, and clay, while the ridges consist of chert and sandstone. The upper Cahaba region contains Cenozoic-era gravel, clay, and sand. In the lower Cahaba region, the soils are calcareous, or chalky.

== Ecology ==
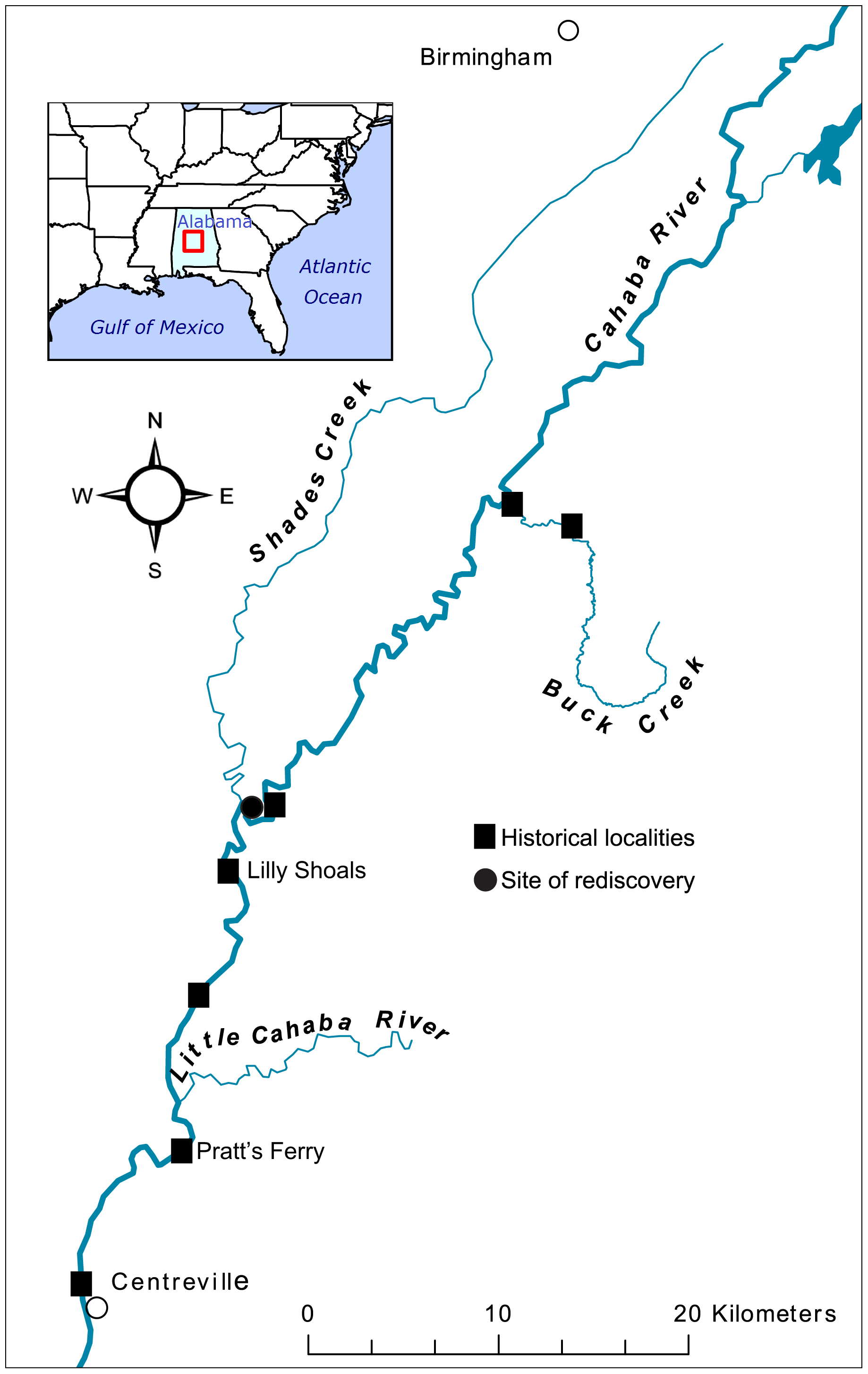
Map of the Cahaba River and some of its tributaries, showing sites where Leptoxis compacta has been found.

The waters of the Cahaba are home to more than 131 species of freshwater fishes (18 of which have been found in no other river system), 40 species of mussels, and 35 species of snails. The river has more fish species than can be found in all bodies of water in California. Sixty-nine of these animal species are endangered. The endemic freshwater snail Elimia cahawbensis is named after the river. One species long thought to be extinct, Leptoxis compacta, the Oblong rocksnail, was rediscovered in the Cahaba in 2011. Due to damming for hydropower, pollution, transportation, and erosion, it has suffered losses of species. Almost a quarter of the original documented mussel species in the Cahaba have disappeared with similar trends in the numbers of fish and snail species. Many species have still been discovered and rediscovered in and on the surrounding region of the river. The Cahaba is also home to 13 snail species not found anywhere else in the world. In the early 21st century, a Georgia botanist Jim Allison discovered eight unknown flower species. Later, eight more were identified along the river's course that previously had not been sited in the state of Alabama. This region is most noted for containing numerous species of mollusks and snails. These species feed other aquatic dwelling animals, improve water quality by eating algae, and even indicate environmental issues due to their receptiveness of pollution. Fourteen of the freshwater fish species are non-native species in the Cahaba River. Among the native fish, the coal darter (Percina brevicauda) is found almost entirely within the Cahaba's main channel; in December 2023 the U.S. Fish and Wildlife Service proposed listing it as a threatened species under the Endangered Species Act, and in April 2026, after the listing remained unfinished, the Center for Biological Diversity sued the agency over the delay.

=== Cahaba lily ===
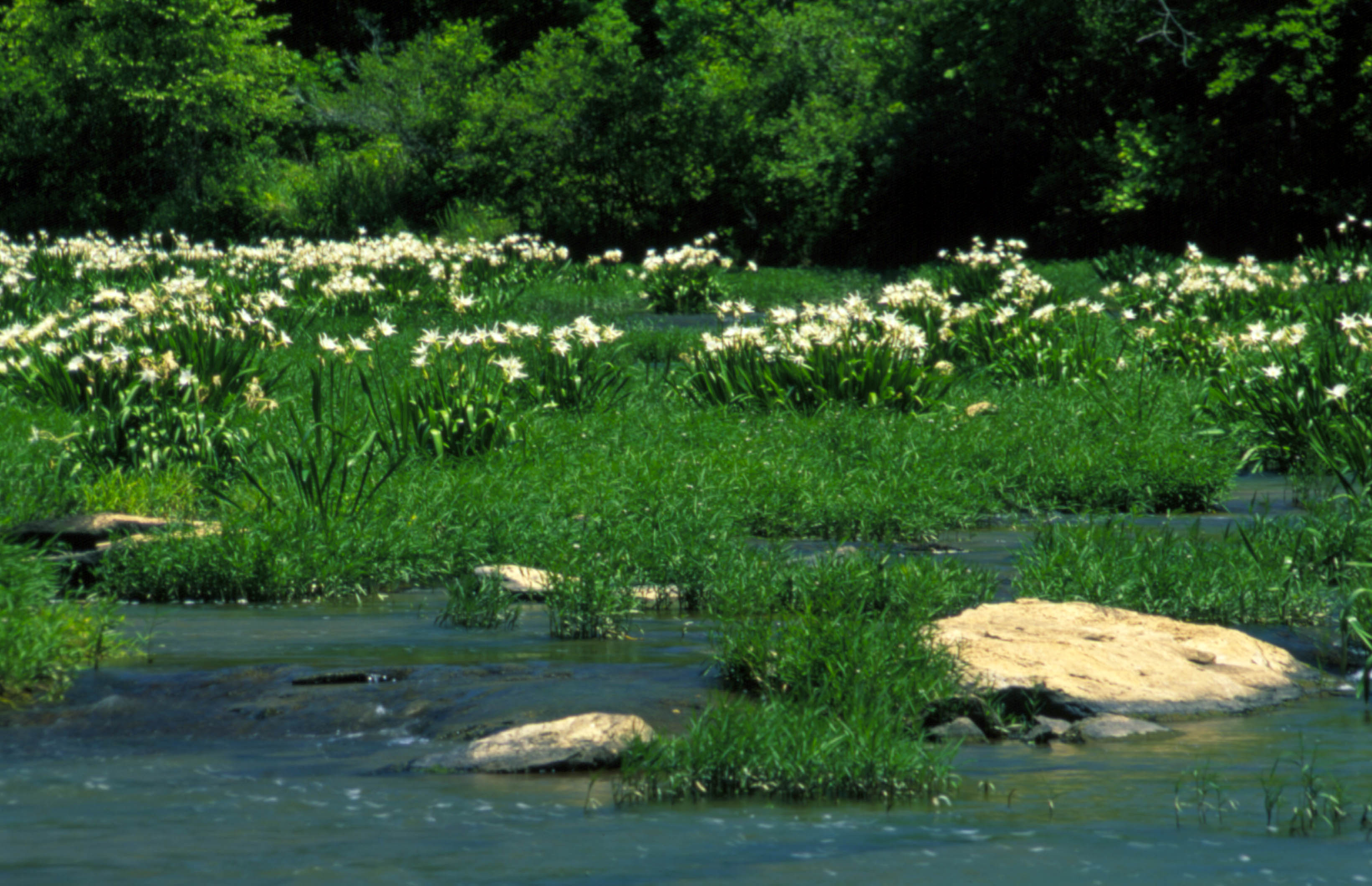
Cahaba lilies in bloom on the Cahaba.

Among the countless plant species that thrive in and around the Cahaba is Hymenocallis coronaria, known in Alabama as the Cahaba lily. As a result of its abundant presence here and its threatened status in the three states where it is found, a portion of the Cahaba River near West Blocton has been designated as the Cahaba River National Wildlife Refuge. It is found only in South Carolina, Georgia, and Alabama. While this flower once was present through all of the Southeast, it now exists in about 70 stands with a fourth of the stands in the Cahaba River. The seeds travel with the river's flow, and crevices in the shoals (rocky bars that run across the river) shelter the seeds as they sprout. The Cahaba lilies bloom in early May, and the entire blooming season is through by mid-June. The flowers open in the evening instead of the day due to pollination by sphinx moths, which are active at night. Each flower blooms and lasts only one day before wilting.

== Tributaries ==
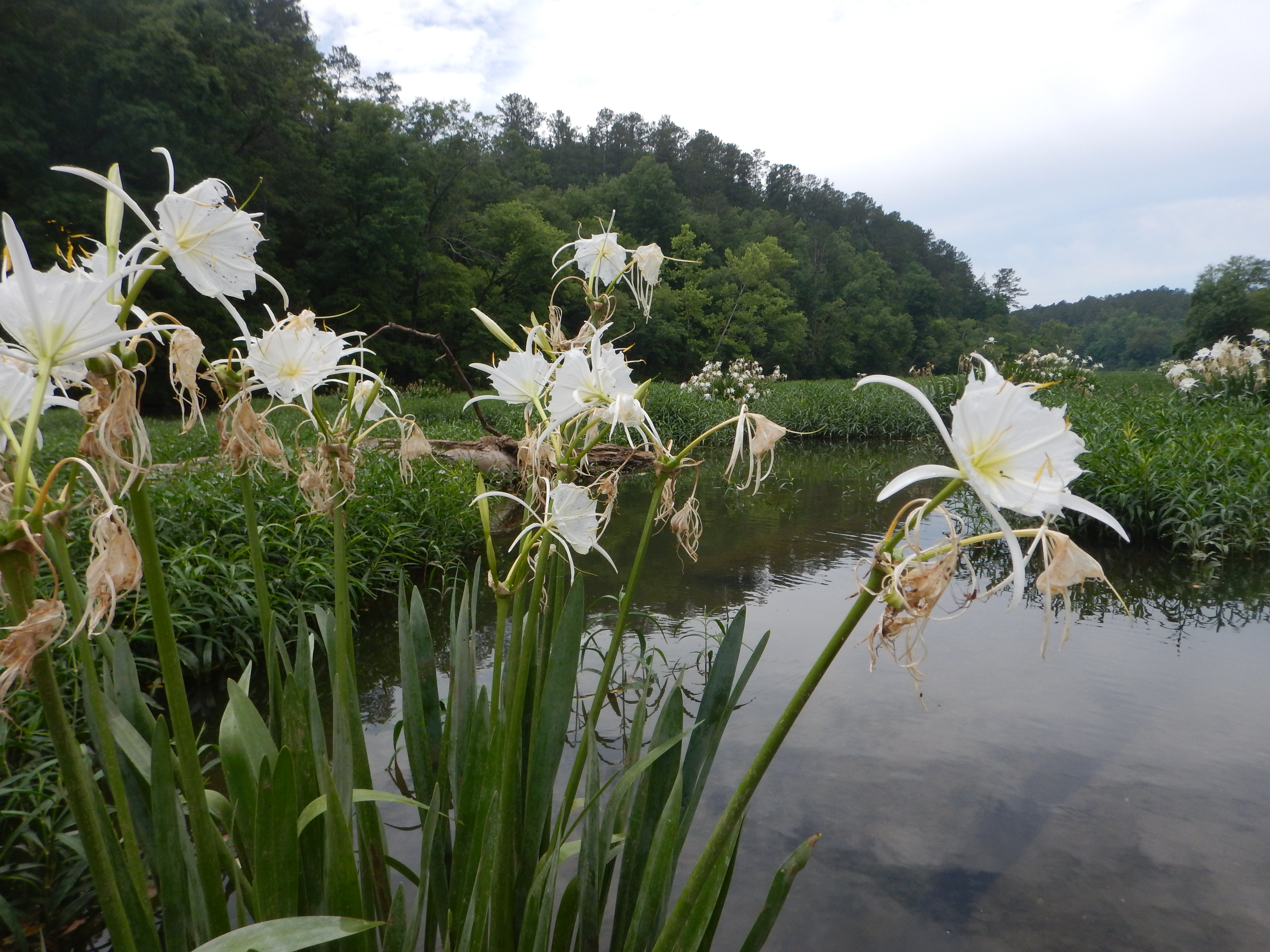
Cahaba lilies at the Cahaba River National Wildlife Refuge

There are numerous small tributaries, including:

- Buck Creek, northwest of Helena
- Little Cahaba River (of Shelby County), entering from the southeast, by Cahaba Heights
- Little Cahaba River (of Bibb County), entering from the east some miles north of Centreville
- Shades Creek, entering from the northwest after running parallel to the Cahaba for some time

== Water use ==
The Cahaba flows through heavily populated areas in the Birmingham metropolitan area. It serves as the source of drinking water in the upper course for over 1 million people and is also a popular canoeing destination.

== Major cities ==
A number of Alabama cities lie on the banks of or in close proximity to the river. They include:

- Trussville —Cahaba headwaters
- Birmingham – Cahaba headwaters
- Hoover – Cahaba runs southwest
- Helena – Cahaba runs southwest
- Centreville – Cahaba runs southwest
- Heiberger – Cahaba turns 90 degrees to southeast
- Marion – Cahaba runs southeast (east of Marion)
- Selma – Cahaba runs southeast (west of Selma)
- Cahaba – joins the Alabama River at the 1st permanent state capital, now a state historic site

== Advocacy ==
- The Cahaba Riverkeeper conducts weekly monitoring of recreational access and posts results at www.cahabariverkeeper.org/swimguide. The mission of CRK is to defend the ecological integrity of the Cahaba river and to ensure clean water, a healthy aquatic environment, and the recreational and aesthetic values of the river. CRK conducts additional monitoring to identify violations of clean water legislation.
- The Cahaba River Society is Alabama's largest watershed conservation organization and is recognized nationally for river stewardship. CRS's success is due to a balanced, science-based, and inclusive approach. Its mission is to restore and protect the Cahaba River watershed and its rich diversity of life.
- The Nature Conservancy Sustainable Waters Program The Sustainable Waters Program works with a range of partners to address freshwater issues relating to farms, energy, cities and floodplains.
- The Cahaba River Basin Clean Water Partnership mission is to identify issues, explore solutions, and make recommendations for the management and stewardship of the Cahaba River basin while maintaining the balance between protecting the environment and promoting the economy.
- The Alabama Rivers Alliance works to unite the citizens of Alabama to protect peoples right to clean, healthy, waters.
- Alabama Water Watch is dedicated to volunteer citizen monitoring of water quality in Alabama Rivers.
- The Presbytery of Sheppards and Lapsley, the regional governing body for the Presbyterian Church (USA) in central Alabama, is developing a camp and conference center on the Cahaba River called Living River. PSL is working diligently to develop this center in an environmentally sound way, and to protect the river. PSL helped remove the Marvel Slab Dam in partnership with many other organizations, which helped a large portion of the river return to its natural, free flowing state.
- The Freshwater Land Trust, a nonprofit organization whose mission is the acquisition and stewardship of lands that enhance water quality and preserve open space in Central Alabama. Website:
