= Isaac Lea =

American publisher, conchologist and geologist (1792-1886)

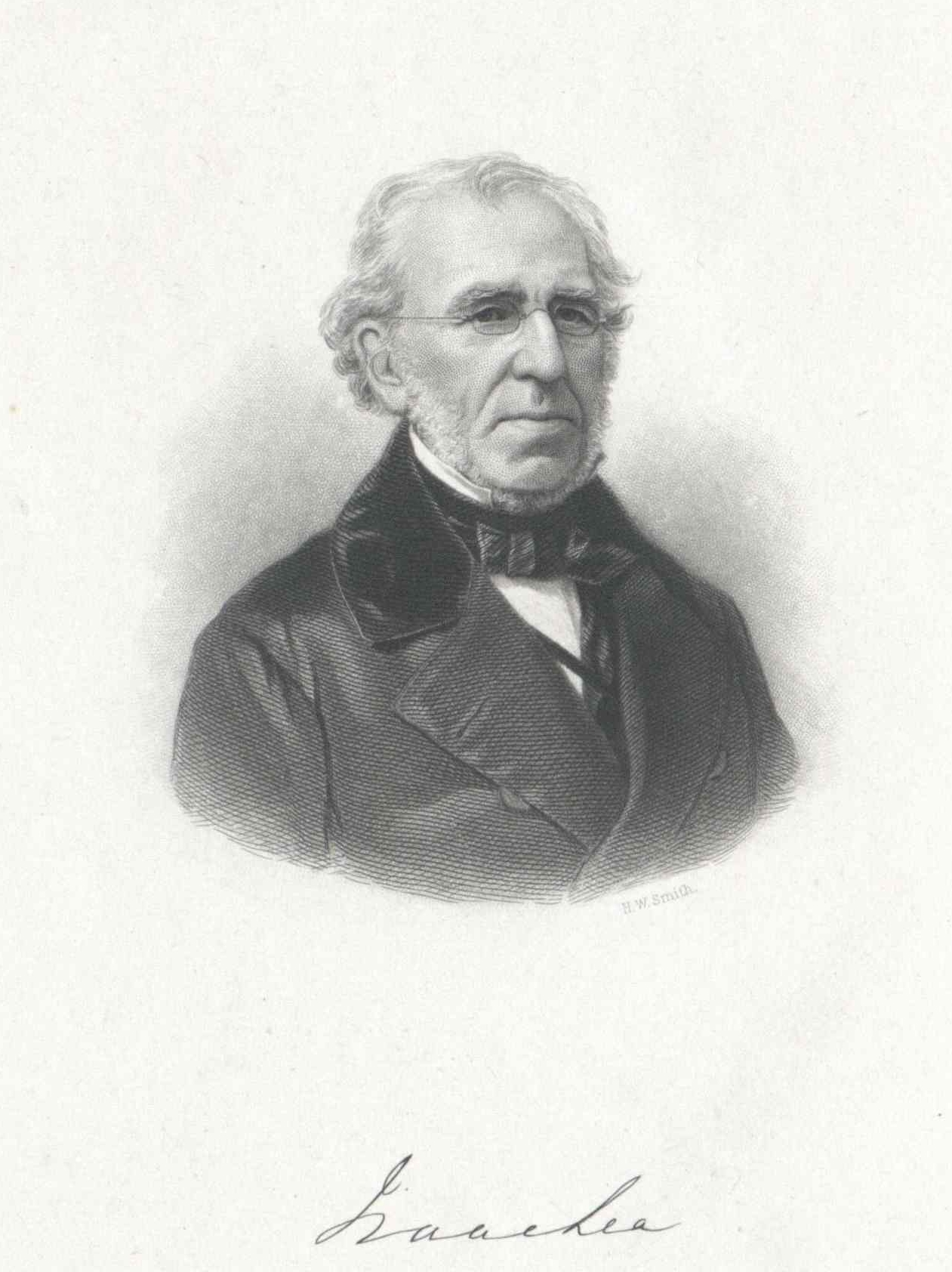
- Born: March 4, 1792; Wilmington, Delaware, U.S.
- Died: December 8, 1886 (aged 94); Philadelphia, Pennsylvania, U.S.
- Resting place: Laurel Hill Cemetery, Philadelphia, Pennsylvania, U.S.
- Spouse: Frances Ann Carey (m. 1821; died 1873)
- Children: 3 (incl. Henry Charles Lea and Mathew Carey Lea)
- Relatives: Mathew Carey (father-in-law)

Isaac Lea (March 4, 1792 – December 8, 1886) was an American publisher, conchologist and geologist. He was a partner in the publishing businesses Matthew Carey & Sons; Carey, Lea & Carey; Carey, Lea & Blanchard; and Lea & Blanchard.

He authored multiple books describing the freshwater mussel genus Unio and named 1,842 species of fifty genera of freshwater and land mollusks. He sparked a scientific controversy amongst geologists when he published about his discovery of fossilized footprints in Mount Carbon, Pennsylvania, that he incorrectly proposed were from a reptile from the Devonian Period over 360 million years old. The fossil has since been identified as that of an amphibian from the Mississippian Age over 330 million years old.

He served as president of the Academy of Natural Sciences of Philadelphia from 1858 to 1863 and of the American Association for the Advancement of Sciences in 1860.

== Early life and education ==
Lea was born on March 4, 1792, in Wilmington, Delaware. His grandparents, John and Hannah Hopton Lea, emigrated to the Province of Pennsylvania with William Penn in 1699. His parents were James J. Lea, a merchant, and Elizabeth Gibson Lea. He was studying to be a physician, but began working at his brother John's import business in Philadelphia at the age of 15.

He was close friends with Lardner Vanuxem as a child and the two developed an interest in geology and were exposed to the mineralogical collection of Adam Seybert.

Lea was born a Quaker but forsook his faith's traditional pacifism and joined the 7th Company of the 24th Pennsylvania Militia during the War of 1812. The unit served as a home guard and never saw action, however he was still expelled from the Religious Society of Friends. In 1820, he married Frances Ann Carey, daughter of noted publisher Mathew Carey.

He received an LL.D. degree from Harvard in 1853.

== Business career ==
His father-in-law Mathew Carey founded the Matthew Carey & Company publishing company and brought his son Henry Charles Carey and Lea in as partners and changed the company name to Matthew Carey & Sons. Matthew retired in 1824 and another of his sons joined the firm and the name was changed to Carey, Lea & Carey. In 1833, William A. Blanchard was brought on as a partner and the firm was briefly known as Carey, Lea & Blanchard until Henry Charles Carey retired in 1836 and the firm name was changed again to Lea & Blanchard. The publishing house became one of the most successful in America, and was known for publishing items such as The Encyclopedia Americana and a dictionary of German lexicon.

In the early 1830s, he became a partner in the Dauphin and Susquehanna Coal Company which owned 42,000 acres on the eastern bank of the Susquehanna River.

In 1851, Isaac retired from the publishing business and made his son Henry Charles Lea a full partner and the name was changed to Lea Brothers.

== Scientific career ==
Lea worked with Lardner Vanuxem during his work on the geology of New York. Many geological histories are defined by mollusk fossils which led Lea to also study living mollusks.

In 1815, Lea joined the Academy of Natural Sciences and published his first paper on minerals found in the Philadelphia area in 1817.

Lea devoted his leisure time to natural history, both collecting objects and publishing books (some illustrated by his son Henry Charles Lea). He was especially interested in freshwater and land mollusks. He studied mollusks from the Ohio River submitted to the Academy of Natural Sciences by Major Stephen Harriman Long and shells collected by his brother near Cincinnati. Lea described these specimens in the publication Description of Six New Specimens of the Genus Unio which he presented at the American Philosophical Society in 1827 and was the first of multiple papers on Unio. For 50 years he delivered and published 279 scientific articles, books and essays. He named 1,842 species of fifty genera of freshwater and land mollusks, however many of the species he described are not distinct. His publications on geology included a range of topics including coal, earthquakes, fossils and minerals.

In 1849, Lea presented a paper on fossilized footprints he discovered in red sandstone in Mount Carbon, Pennsylvania. Lea contended the tracks were reptilian and that due to the strata of rock where the footprints were found, they were from the Devonian Period between 360 and 408 million years old and constituted a new species that he named Sauropus primaevus. The finding sparked a controversy in the geology community and the date of the fossil was challenged by Henry Darwin Rogers, the state geologist of Pennsylvania. Noted geologist Louis Agassiz proposed that the footprints were not those of a reptile but rather those of an amphibian. The footprints have since been identified as coming from an amphibian known as Palaeosauropus primaevus from the Mississippian Age over 330 million years ago.

He was a member and vice-president of the American Philosophical Society (elected in 1828) and also served as president of the Academy of Natural Sciences of Philadelphia (1858–1863), both based in Philadelphia. Lea served as president of the American Association for the Advancement of Science in 1860.

== Family ==
His two sons, Henry Charles Lea and Matthew Carey Lea achieved distinction in scholarly fields and the family publishing business. The brothers married the Jaudon sisters and their children also joined the family business, which ultimately became Lea & Febiger. Henry Charles Lea (September 19, 1825 – October 24, 1909) was an American historian, civic reformer, and political activist in Philadelphia. Mathew Carey Lea (1823–1897) was a lawyer as well as founder of mechanochemistry and early photographer.

== Death and legacy ==
He died on December 8, 1886, in Philadelphia and was interred in Laurel Hill Cemetery. In 1829 Edgar Allan Poe wrote a poem dedicated to Lea titled "To Isaac Lea".

Three mollusks were named in his honor, Crenella leana Dall, 1897, Lymnaea leai F.C. Baker, 1907 and Periploma leanum (Conrad, 1831).

The National Museum at Washington now has his immense collection of freshwater mussels from the family Unionidae, as well as other collections.

The Historical Society of Pennsylvania has the records of Lea & Febiger, as well as predecessor companies.

Two slabs of rock containing the fossilized footprints and plaster casts of the footprints discovered by Lea are in the collections of the Smithsonian Institution.

== Publications ==
- Lea, I. 1818. An account of the minerals at present known to exist within the vicinity of Philadelphia. Journal of the Academy of Natural Sciences of Philadelphia 1, 462–482. (BHL link)
- (1823) Complete, Historical, Chronological, and Geographical American Atlas
- (1827–1874). Observations on the Genus Unio. 13 volumes.
- Contributions to Geology, Carey, Lea & Blanchard, Philadelphia, 1833
- (1837). "Observations on the Naiades". Transactions of the American Philosophical Society 5
- (1838). Synopsis of the Family of Naiades
- Lea I. (1838). "Description of New Freshwater and Land Shells". Transactions of the American Philosophical Society 6: 1–154.
- Lea, Isaac (1871-04-01). "Descriptions of Twenty New Species of Uniones of the United States". Proceedings of the Academy of Natural Sciences of Philadelphia. 23 (2): 189–193. ISSN 0097-3157. JSTOR 4624172.
- A Synopsis of the Family of Naiades, Blanchard and Lea, Philadelphia, 1852
- On the Fossil Foot-marks in the Red Sandstone of Pottsville, Pennsylvania, self-published, Philadelphia, 1852
- Observations on the Genus Unio, Together with Descriptions of New Genera and Species in the Family Unionidae, Volumes 6-7, J. Kay, Philadelphia, 1857
- Check Lists of the Shells of North America, Smithsonian Institution, Washington, June, 1860

Molluscan taxa named by Lea include:

- Euglandina vanuxemensis (Lea, 1834) – a carnivorous land snail
- Unio lawii (Lea, 1871) – named for Annie Law

== Sources ==
- Youmans, William Jay (1896). Pioneers of Science in America. D. Appleton and Company.
