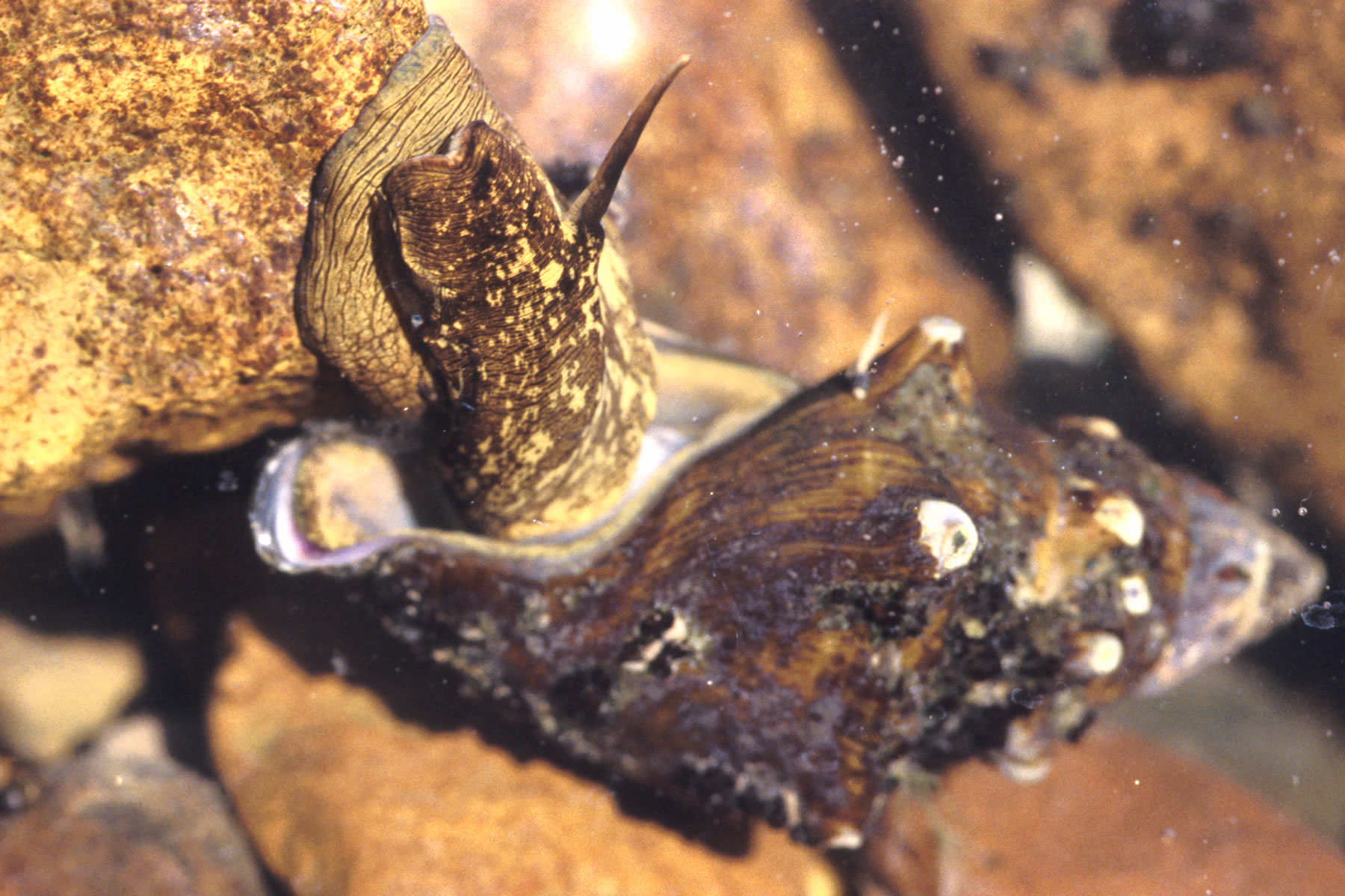
- Io fluvialis
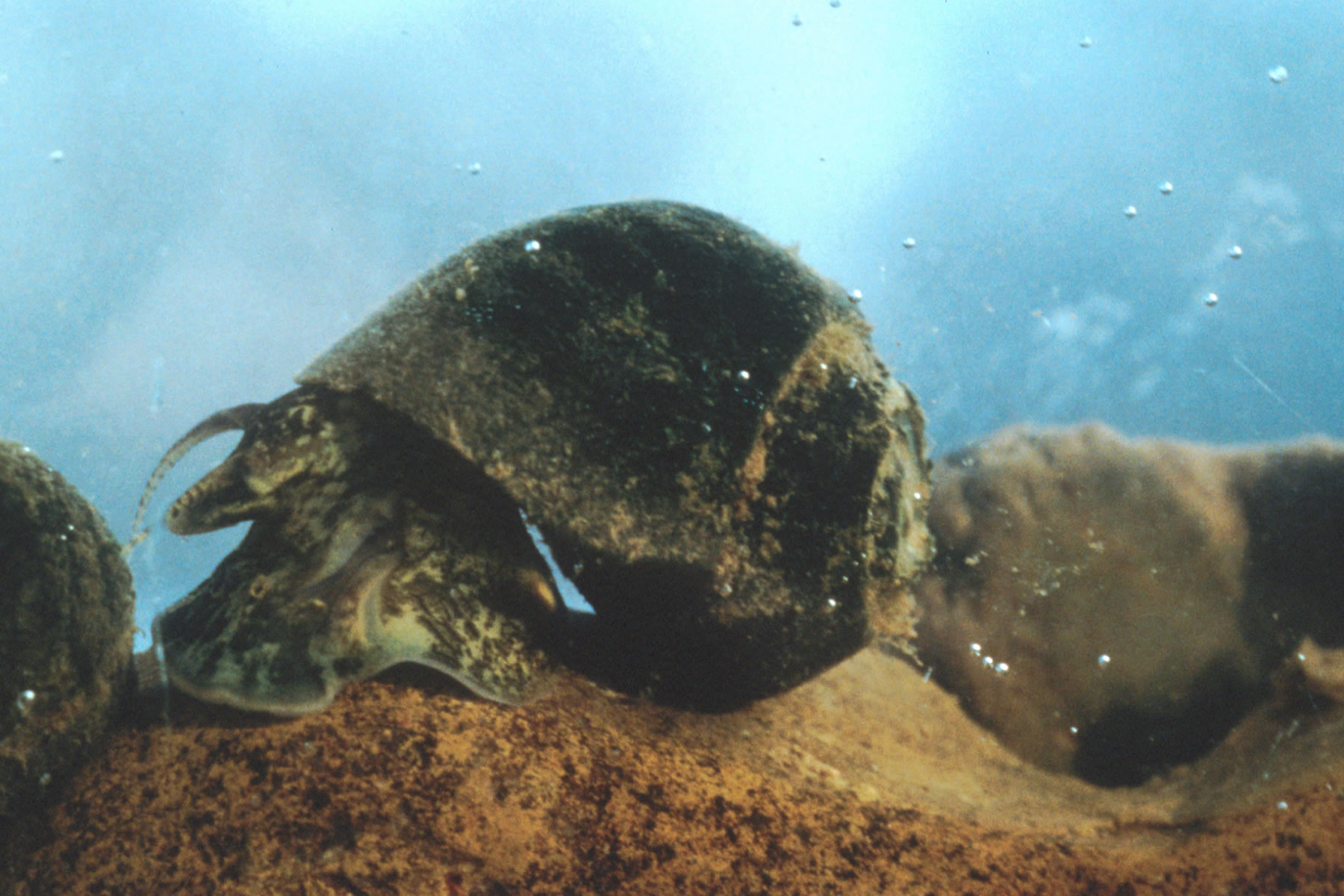
- Athearnia anthonyi

Scientific classification
- Kingdom: Animalia
- Phylum: Mollusca
- Class: Gastropoda
- Subclass: Caenogastropoda
- Order: incertae sedis
- Superfamily: Cerithioidea
- Family: Pleuroceridae; Fischer, 1885

Diversity
- About 150 extant species

Synonyms
- Anaplocamidae Dall, 1921 ·; Ceriphasiidae Gill, 1863 ·; Ceriphasiinae Gill, 1863 · > junior subjective synonym; Ellipstomatidae Hannibal, 1912 ·; Gyrotominae Hannibal, 1912 ·; Strepomatidae Haldeman, 1864

= Pleuroceridae =

Family of gastropods

Pleuroceridae, common name pleurocerids, is a family of small to medium-sized freshwater snails, aquatic gilled gastropod mollusks in the superfamily Cerithioidea.

== Description ==
(Original description) This animal is fluviatile and similar to those found in the family Thiaridae; however, it is oviparous and possesses a mantle that is not fringed. According to William Stimpson, these organisms lack copulatory organs. The central tooth of the radula is short, wide, and arched at the base, featuring a multi-cuspidate edge. The lateral tooth is rhomboidal with a very well-developed primary cusp, while the marginal teeth are narrow and pectinated at their extremities. Additionally, the jaws are polygonal and scaly.

The shell is either melaniform or cerithiform in shape. The aperture may be entire, sinuous, or canaliculated, and the outer lip is sharp. The operculum is thin and paucispiral, with an anterior and submarginal nucleus.

The mollusks belonging to this family have a geographic distribution that is limited to North America. Of the 464 species described by Tryon in his 1875 monograph, approximately half originate from Tennessee and Alabama. These shells are so abundant that they literally cover the surface of the rocky riverbeds, sometimes leaving barely an inch of free space. Their summits are generally eroded.

Stimpson did not find any valid differences between the animals of the genera Io, Ancylotus (synonym of Leptoxis Rafinesque, 1819), and Goniobasis (synonym of Elimia H. Adams & A. Adams, 1854). However, the primary cusp of the lateral tooth in Ancylotus is very wide and obtuse, whereas it is acuminate in the genera Goniobasis, Io, and Gyrotoma.

These snails have an operculum and typically a robust high-spired shell.

Reproduction is iteroparous, and juvenile snails emerge from eggs laid on a firm surface by a gonochoristic female. There is no veliger stage.

== Evolution ==
There is very high level of mitochondrial heterogeneity in apparent species of Pleuroceridae (highest among gastropods, also with Semisulcospiridae), that has not been sufficiently explained yet as of 2015. However, it has been suggested that this may be due to pleurocerids having very poor dispersal abilities, allowing even slightly separated populations to see great genetic divergence.

Populations of the pleurocerid species in the Old Appalachians (Virginia south to Georgia) are present on both sides of the Eastern Continental Divide, but there is no difference in the extent of intrapopulation heterogeneity on either side, and there is no evidence for cryptic speciation on either side either. Given the age of the Appalachians, it has been suggested that these populations may be extremely ancient, dating back to the Paleozoic when the initial Appalachian orogeny separated them, to the extent that any geographic signal in the test gene for the divergence estimates has been lost. Levels of genetic divergence appear to be lower in the modern center for pleurocerid diversity (the Alabama and Coosa river systems) than in the Old Appalachians, indicating that the latter may represent the ancestral origin of pleurocerids.

== Distribution ==
As currently defined, this family is confined entirely to eastern North American fresh waters. Similar snails formerly classified with Pleuroceridae, but now assigned to other families are widespread in temperate and tropical parts of Southern and Eastern Asia, and Africa. Most require unpolluted rivers and streams, but a few are adapted to living in lakes or reservoirs.

== Taxonomy ==
=== 2005 taxonomy ===
The following two subfamilies have been recognized in the taxonomy of Bouchet & Rocroi (2005):

- Pleurocerinae (P. Fischer, 1885) - synonyms: Ceriphasiinae (Gill, 1863); Strepomatidae (Haldeman, 1864); Ellipstomatidae (Hannibal, 1912); Gyrotominae (Hannibal, 1912); Anaplocamidae (Dall, 1921)
- Semisulcospirinae (Morrison, 1952) - synonym: Jugidae (Starobogatov, Prozorova, Bogatov & Sayenko, 2004)

=== 2009 taxonomy ===
Subfamily Semisulcospirinae within Pleuroceridae was elevated to family level Semisulcospiridae by Strong & Köhler (2009).

== Genera ==
Genera within the family Pleuroceridae are organized in the one subfamily only since 2009 and they include:

- † Anculopsis Yen, 1947
- Athearnia J. P. E. Morrison, 1971
- † Carbonispira Yen, 1949
- † Circamelania Yen, 1951
- Elimia H. Adams & A. Adams, 1854
- Gyrotoma Shuttleworth, 1845
- Io I. Lea, 1831
- Leptoxis Rafinesque, 1819
- Lithasia Haldeman, 1840
- Lithasiopsis Pilsbry, 1910
- Pleurocera Rafinesque, 1818
