= List of Saint Helena, Ascension and Tristan da Cunha species extinct in the Holocene =

Location of Saint Helena, Ascension and Tristan da Cunha in the South Atlantic Ocean.

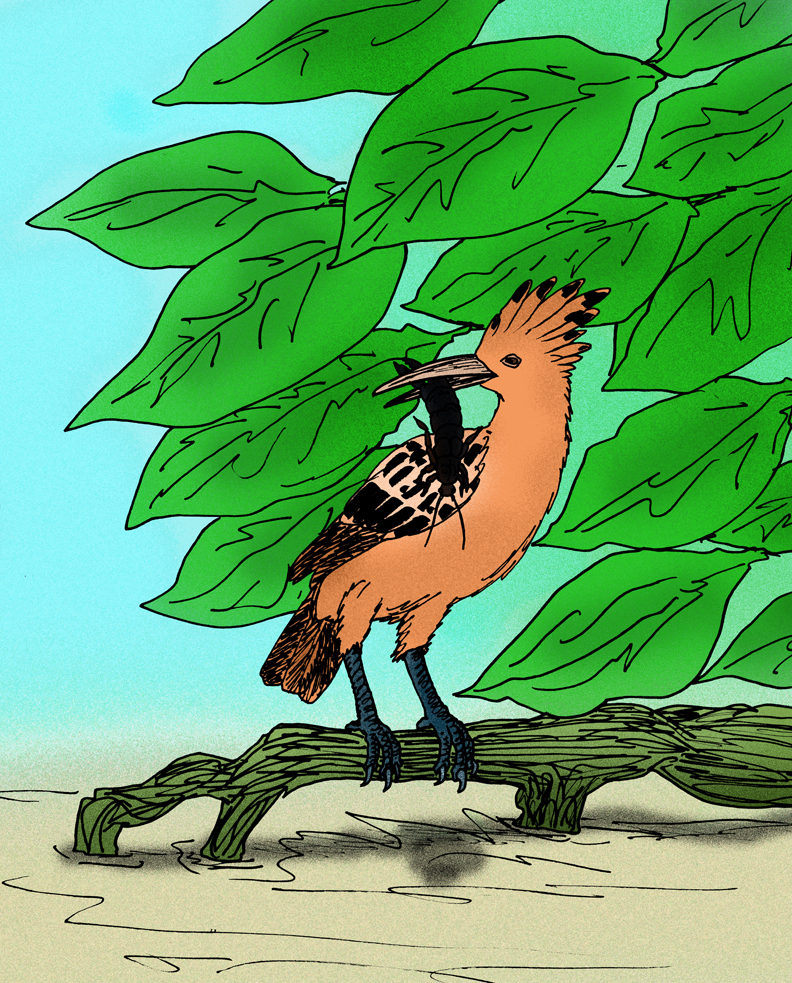
The Saint Helena hoopoe (Upupa antaios) became extinct soon after the island was discovered in 1502.

This is a list of Saint Helena, Ascension and Tristan da Cunha animals extinct in the Holocene that covers extinctions from the Holocene epoch, a geologic epoch that began about 11,650 years before present (about 9700 BCE) (Note: The source gives "11,700 calendar yr b2k (before CE 2000)". But "BP" means "before CE 1950". Therefore, the Holocene began 11,650 BP. Doing the math, that is c. 9700 BCE.) and continues to the present day.

Saint Helena, Ascension and Tristan da Cunha is a British Overseas Territory located in the South Atlantic. The territory consists of Saint Helena, Ascension Island, and the archipelago of Tristan da Cunha (including Gough Island), all of volcanic origin.

Numerous animal species have disappeared from Saint Helena, Ascension and Tristan da Cunha as part of the ongoing Holocene extinction, driven by human activity.

== Mammals (class Mammalia) ==
=== Carnivorans (order Carnivora) ===
==== Earless seals (family Phocidae) ====
===== Locally extinct =====
Common name	Scientific name	Range	Comments	Pictures
Southern elephant seal	Mirounga leonina	Antarctic	Most recent remains in Saint Helena dated to historical times.	

== Birds (class Aves) ==
=== Cuckoos (order Cuculiformes) ===
==== Cuckoos (family Cuculidae) ====
Common name	Scientific name	Range	Comments
Saint Helena cuckoo	Nannococcyx psix	Saint Helena	Most recent remains dated to around 1640. It likely became extinct when the island was deforested. Since the Saint Helena cuckoo was unusually small for a cuckoo, it likely parasited a small forest passerine species that is also extinct now.

=== Pigeons and doves (order Columbiformes) ===
==== Pigeons and doves (family Columbidae) ====
Common name	Scientific name	Range	Comments	Pictures
Saint Helena dove	Dysmoropelia dekarchiskos	Saint Helena	Most recent remains dated to c. 12050 BCE, but speculated to have survived until settlement due a 1584 mention of doves in the island. It was the fourth largest pigeon ever (after the dodo, Rodrigues solitaire, and Viti Levu giant pigeon) and like them, likely flightless, which would have made it easy prey of humans or introduced mammals.	

=== Rails and cranes (order Gruiformes) ===
==== Rails (family Rallidae) ====
Common name	Scientific name	Range	Comments	Pictures
Saint Helena rail	Aphanocrex podarces	Saint Helena	Most recent remains dated to around 1640.	
Tristan moorhen	Gallinula nesiotis	Tristan da Cunha	Last recorded in 1873. Became extinct due to hunting, predation by introduced rats, cats, and pigs, and habitat destruction by fire.	
Ascension crake	Mundia elpenor	Ascension Island	Last recorded in 1656. It probably became extinct after the introduction of rats in the 18th century, or cats in 1815.	
Saint Helena crake	Zapornia astrictocarpus	Saint Helena	Most recent remains dated to around 1640.	

=== Shorebirds (order Charadriiformes) ===
==== Gulls, terns, and skimmers (family Laridae) ====
===== Locally extinct =====
Common name	Scientific name	Range	Comments	Pictures
Kelp gull	Larus dominicanus	Southern Hemisphere coasts	Present in Saint Helena before c. 1640. It is unknown if it bred on the island.	

=== Albatrosses and petrels (order Procellariiformes) ===
==== Southern storm petrels (family Oceanitidae) ====
===== Locally extinct =====
Common name	Scientific name	Range	Comments	Pictures
White-faced storm petrel	Pelagodroma marina	Circumtropical	Most recent remains in Saint Helena dated to c. 1640.	

==== Petrels and shearwaters (family Procellariidae) ====
Common name	Scientific name	Range	Comments
Olson's petrel	Bulweria bifax	Saint Helena	Most recent remains at Sandy Bay dated to around 1640. It was replaced afterwards by Bulwer's petrel.
Saint Helena petrel	Pterodroma rupinarum	Saint Helena	Most recent remains at Prosperous Bay dated to around 1640. The species nested on the ground and was vulnerable to predation by cats and other introduced mammals.
Saint Helena shearwater	Puffinus pacificoides	Saint Helena	Known from fossils dated to around 14,000 years ago, but could have survived until the Holocene and become extinct when the climate ameliorated.

===== Locally extinct =====
Common name	Scientific name	Range	Comments	Pictures
Sargasso shearwater	Puffinus lherminieri	Atlantic Ocean and the Caribbean Sea	Most recent remains in Saint Helena dated to c. 1640.	

=== Boobies, cormorants, and relatives (order Suliformes) ===
==== Frigatebirds (family Fregatidae) ====
===== Locally extinct =====
Common name	Scientific name	Range	Comments	Pictures
Lesser frigatebird	Fregata ariel	Circumtropical	Most recent remains in Saint Helena dated to c. 1640.	
Great frigatebird	Fregata minor	Circumtropical	Most recent remains in Saint Helena dated to c. 1640.	

==== Boobies and gannets (family Sulidae) ====
===== Locally extinct =====
Common name	Scientific name	Range	Comments	Pictures
Red-footed booby	Sula sula	Oceanic circumglobal between the Tropic of Cancer and the Tropic of Capricorn	Most recent remains in Saint Helena dated to c. 1640.	

=== Pelicans, herons, and ibises (order Pelecaniformes) ===
==== Herons (family Ardeidae) ====
Common name	Scientific name	Range	Comments
Ascension night heron	Nycticorax olsoni	Ascension Island	Likely the "aponar" (an old name for the great auk) mentioned by André Thévet in 1555. It was flightless or a poor flyer and nested on the ground, making it vulnerable to hunting and predation by introduced mammals.

=== Hornbills and hoopoes (order Bucerotiformes) ===
==== Hoopoes (family Upupidae) ====
Common name	Scientific name	Range	Comments	Pictures
Saint Helena hoopoe	Upupa antaios	Saint Helena	Most recent remains at Prosperous Bay dated to around 1640. It was flightless or a poor flyer, making it easy prey for introduced cats and rats.	

== Insects (class Insecta) ==
=== Dragonflies and damselflies (order Odonata) ===
==== Skimmers, perchers, and relatives (family Libellulidae) ====
Common name	Scientific name	Range	Comments
Saint Helena darter	Sympetrum dilatatum	Saint Helena	Last collected in 1963. The causes of extinction are unknown, but habitat destruction has been suggested.

=== Earwigs (order Dermaptera) ===
==== Striped earwigs (order Labiduridae) ====
Common name	Scientific name	Range	Comments	Pictures
Saint Helena earwig	Labidura herculeana	Saint Helena	Last collected in 1967. Isolated exoskeleton pieces of individuals that were ingested by birds and spiders were found as late as 2014, but the large size and robustness of the species make it impossible to guess how recent they are. The earwig's habitat has been degraded by construction since it was last seen alive, while invasive predators like rats, mice, spiders, and the centipede Scolopendra morsitans have increased.	

=== Beetles (order Coleoptera) ===
==== Ground beetles (family Carabidae) ====
Scientific name	Range	Comments	Pictures
Aplothorax burchelli	Saint Helena	Last collected in 1966-1967.	

== Slugs and snails (class Gastropoda) ==
=== Order Stylommatophora ===
==== Family Achatinidae ====
Common name	Scientific name	Range	Comments	Pictures
	Chilonopsis blofeldi	Saint Helena	Last seen in the 1870s.	
	Chilonopsis exulatus	Saint Helena	Last seen in the 1870s.	
	Chilonopsis helena	Saint Helena	Last seen in the 1870s.	
	Chilonopsis melanoides	Saint Helena	Last recorded alive in 1878.	
Great Saint Helena awl snail	Chilonopsis nonpareil	Saint Helena	Described from subfossil shells in 1875. It probably disappeared due to habitat modification caused by introduced goats, pigs, and rabbits, or predation by rats, mice, and the centipede Scolopendra morsitans.	
	Chilonopsis subplicatus	Saint Helena	Last seen in the 1870s.	
	Chilonopsis subtruncatus	Saint Helena	Last seen in the 1870s.	
	Chilonopsis turtoni	Saint Helena	Last recorded alive around 1884-86. It was probably the last species within its genus to go extinct.	

==== Family Charopidae ====
Scientific name	Range	Comments
Helenoconcha leptalea	Saint Helena	Last seen in the 1870s.
Helenoconcha minutissima	Saint Helena	Last seen in the 1870s.
Helenoconcha polyodon	Saint Helena	Last seen in the 1870s.
Helenoconcha pseustes	Saint Helena	Last seen in the 1870s.
Helenoconcha sexdentata	Saint Helena	Last seen in the 1870s.
Helenodiscus bilamellata	Saint Helena	Last seen in the 1870s.
Helenodiscus vernoni	Saint Helena	Last seen in the 1870s.
Pseudohelenoconcha spurca	Saint Helena	

==== Family Pupillidae ====
Scientific name	Range	Comments
Pupilla obliquicosta	Saint Helena	Last seen in the 1870s.

==== Whorl snails (family Vertiginidae) ====
Scientific name	Range	Comments
Campolaemus perexilis	Saint Helena	Last seen in the 1870s.

== Plants (kingdom Plantae) ==
=== Ferns (class Polypodiopsida) ===
==== Wood ferns (family Dryopteridaceae) ====
Scientific name	Range	Comments
Dryopteris ascensionis	Summit of Green Mountain, Ascension Island	Last recorded in 1889, with an unconfirmed sighting near Garden Cottage in 1976. Likely extinct due to competition with introduced invasive plants.

=== Flowering plants (clade Angiospermae) ===
==== Sunflowers (family Asteraceae) ====
Scientific name	Range	Comments
Commidendrum gummifolia	Central ridge of Saint Helena	Pure individuals are apparently extinct, but possible hybrids survive at Peak Dale, and possibly the Deep Valley.

===== Extinct in the wild =====
Common name	Scientific name	Range	Comments	Pictures
She cabbage tree	Lachanodes arborea	Saint Helena	Last wild individual died in 2012. Declined due to deforestation.	

==== Forget-me-nots (family Boraginaceae) ====
Common name	Scientific name	Range	Comments
Saint Helena heliotrope	Heliotropium pannifolium	Coastal lowlands of Saint Helena	Only known from the holotype collected in Broad Gut in 1810. Likely eradicated by introduced feral goats grazing.

==== Euphorbias (family Euphorbiaceae) ====
Common name	Scientific name	Range	Comments
Stringwood	Acalypha rubrinervis	Possibly the Central Ridge of Saint Helena	Last collected between 1855 and 1875.

==== Mallows (family Malvaceae) ====
Common name	Scientific name	Range	Comments	Pictures
Saint Helena ebony	Trochetiopsis melanoxylon	Lowland Saint Helena	Last recorded in 1771, with unconfirmed reports until 1816. Extinct due to overexploitation for wood, and predation by introduced feral goats.	

===== Extinct in the wild =====
Common name	Scientific name	Range	Comments	Pictures
Saint Helena redwood	Trochetiopsis erythroxylon	Upper mid-altitude Saint Helena	Last wild individual in Peak Dale Gut died in the 1950s.	

==== True grasses (family Poaceae) ====
Scientific name	Range	Comments
Sporobolus durus	Weather Post, Ascension Island	Last recorded in 1886.

==== Buckthorns (family Rhamnaceae) ====
Common name	Scientific name	Range	Comments	Pictures
Saint Helena olive	Nesiota elliptica	Central Ridge of Saint Helena	The last known tree in the wild died in 1994, and the last seedlings cultivated from it died of a fungal infection in 2003.	

==== Coffee trees and relatives (family Rubiaceae) ====
Scientific name	Range	Comments	Pictures
Oldenlandia adscensionis	Green Mountain, Ascension Island	Possibly last recorded in 1985. Possibly extinct due to introduced predators like goats, sheep, rabbits, and rats, or competition with introduced plants.	
