= List of non-marine molluscs of Saint Helena =

This is a list of the gastropods found on the island of Saint Helena.

The following tags are used to categorise various species:

- (X) = Extinct - A species that no longer exists.
- (I) = Introduced - A species not native to Saint Helena.
- (E) = Endemic - A species found only on Saint Helena.

== Land snails ==
=== Family Achatinidae ===
- Chilonopsis blofeldi (X)
- Chilonopsis exulatus (X)
- Chilonopsis helena (X)
- Chilonopsis melanoides (X)
- Chilonopsis nonpareil - Great Saint Helena awl snail (X)
- Chilonopsis subplicatus (X)
- Chilonopsis turtoni (X)

=== Family Charopidae ===
- Helenoconcha leptalea (X)
- Helenoconcha minutissima (X)
- Helenoconcha polyodon (X)
- Helenoconcha pseustes (X)
- Helenoconcha relicta - Ammonite snail (E)
- Helenoconcha sexdentata (X)
- Helenodiscus bilamellata (X)
- Helenodiscus vernoni - Wollaston's Saint Helena Discus snail (X)
- Pseudohelenoconcha spurca (X)

=== Family Pupillidae ===
- Pupilla obliquicosta (X)

=== Family Streptaxidae ===
- Campolaemus perexilis (X)

=== Family Succineidae ===
- Succinea sanctaehelenae - Blushing Snail (E)

=== Family Vertiginidae ===
- Nesopupa turtoni (E)
