= List of birds of Saint Helena =

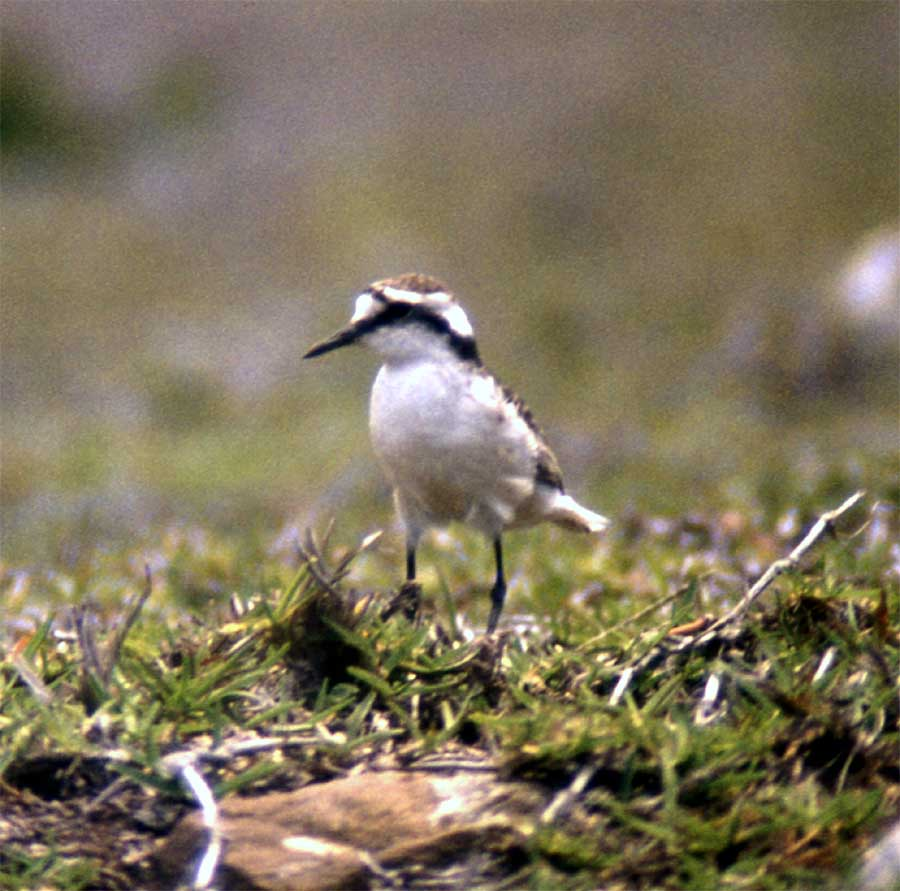
The Saint Helena plover or wirebird, is the only surviving endemic species.

This is a list of the bird species recorded on Saint Helena. The avifauna of Saint Helena Island include a total of 209 species. Only one endemic species survives today, the Saint Helena plover. Several more endemics are extinct and known only from subfossil remains: the Saint Helena petrel, Olson's petrel, Saint Helena shearwater, Saint Helena crake, Saint Helena rail, Saint Helena dove, Saint Helena cuckoo and Saint Helena hoopoe. At least five non-endemics have been extirpated from Saint Helena but still occur elsewhere. 34 species have been introduced by humans and formed established breeding populations while many more species were introduced in the past but failed to become established.

This list's taxonomic treatment (designation and sequence of orders, families and species) and nomenclature (common and scientific names) follow the conventions of The Clements Checklist of Birds of the World, 2022 edition. The family accounts at the beginning of each heading reflect this taxonomy, as do the species counts found in each family account. Introduced and accidental species are included in the total counts for Saint Helena.

The following tags have been used to highlight several categories, but not all species fall into one of these categories. Those that do not are commonly occurring native species.

- (A) Accidental - a species that rarely or accidentally occurs in Saint Helena
- (E) Endemic - a species endemic to Saint Helena
- (I) Introduced - a species introduced to Saint Helena as a consequence, direct or indirect, of human actions
- (Ex) Extirpated - a species that no longer breeds in Saint Helena although populations exist elsewhere
- (X) Extinct - a species that was formerly endemic to Saint Helena but has now been wiped out

== Ducks, geese, and waterfowl ==
Order: Anseriformes Family: Anatidae

Anatidae includes the ducks and most duck-like waterfowl, such as geese and swans. These birds are adapted to an aquatic existence with webbed feet, flattened bills, and feathers that are excellent at shedding water due to an oily coating.

- Fulvous whistling-duck, Dendrocygna bicolor
- Knob-billed duck, Sarkidiornis melanotos (A)
- Yellow-billed teal, Anas flavirostris (A)

== Guineafowl ==
Order: Galliformes Family: Numididae

Guineafowl are a group of African, seed-eating, ground-nesting birds that resemble partridges, but with featherless heads and spangled grey plumage.

- Helmeted guineafowl, Numida meleagris (I)

== Pheasants, grouse, and allies ==
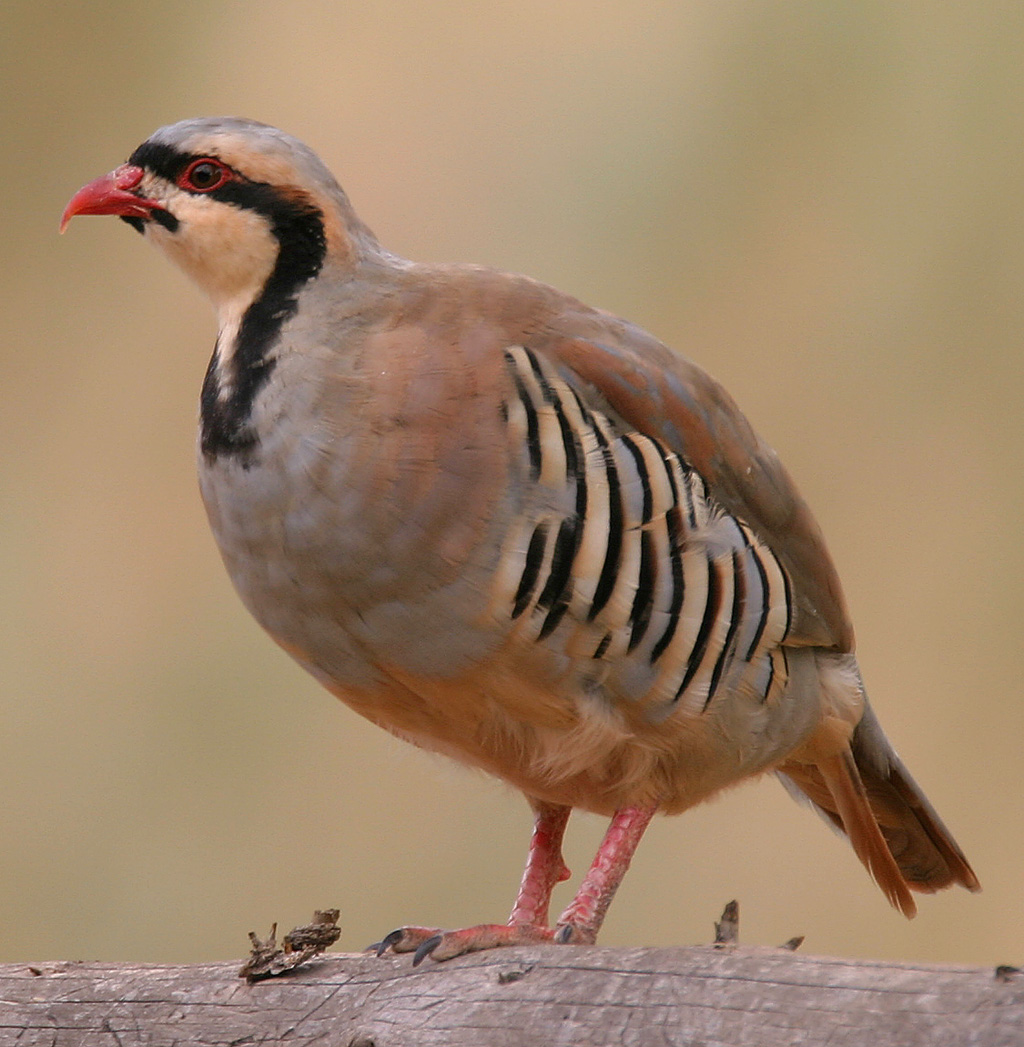
Chukar, an introduced bird of open country

Order: Galliformes Family: Phasianidae

The Phasianidae are a family of terrestrial birds which consists of quails, partridges, snowcocks, francolins, spurfowls, tragopans, monals, pheasants, peafowls and junglefowls. In general, they are plump (although they vary in size) and have broad, relatively short wings.

- Ring-necked pheasant, Phasianus colchicus (I)
- Indian peafowl, Pavo cristatus (I)
- Red junglefowl, Gallus gallus (I)
- Gray francolin, Ortygornis pondicerianus (I)
- Common quail, Coturnix coturnix (I)
- Chukar, Alectoris chukar (I)
- Rock partridge, Alectoris graeca (I)
- Cape francolin, Pternistis capensis (I)
- Red-necked francolin, Pternistis afer (I)

== Grebes ==
Order: Podicipediformes Family: Podicipedidae

Grebes are small to medium-large freshwater diving birds. They have lobed toes and are excellent swimmers and divers. However, they have their feet placed far back on the body, making them quite ungainly on land.

- Little grebe, Tachybaptus ruficollis

== Pigeons and doves ==
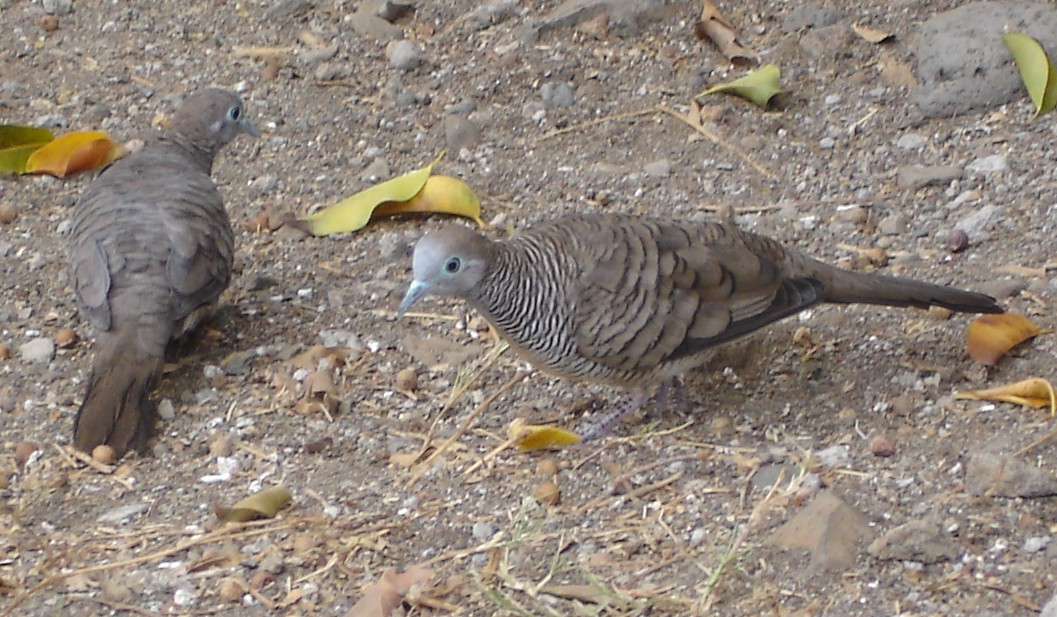
Zebra doves, often seen in settlements

Order: Columbiformes Family: Columbidae

Pigeons and doves are stout-bodied birds with short necks and short slender bills with a fleshy cere.

- Rock pigeon, Columba livia (I)
- Malagasy turtle-dove, Nesoenas picturatus (I)
- Zebra dove, Geopelia striata (I)
- Saint Helena dove, Dysmoropelia dekarchiskos (X)

== Cuckoos ==
Order: Cuculiformes Family: Cuculidae

The family Cuculidae includes cuckoos, roadrunners and anis. These birds are of variable size with slender bodies, long tails and strong legs. The Old World cuckoos are brood parasites.

- Yellow-billed cuckoo, Coccyzus americanus (A)
- St. Helena cuckoo, Nannococcyx psix (X)
- Common cuckoo, Cuculus canorus (A)

== Nightjars and allies ==
Order: Caprimulgiformes Family: Caprimulgidae

Nightjars are medium-sized nocturnal birds that usually nest on the ground. They have long wings, short legs and very short bills. Most have small feet, of little use for walking, and long pointed wings. Their soft plumage is camouflaged to resemble bark or leaves.

- Common nighthawk, Chordeiles minor (A)
- Eurasian nightjar, Caprimulgus europaeus (A)

== Swifts ==
Order: Caprimulgiformes Family: Apodidae

Swifts are small birds which spend the majority of their lives flying. These birds have very short legs and never settle voluntarily on the ground, perching instead only on vertical surfaces. Many swifts have long swept-back wings which resemble a crescent or boomerang.

- Common swift, Apus apus (A)
- Little swift, Apus affinis (A)

== Rails, crakes, and gallinules ==
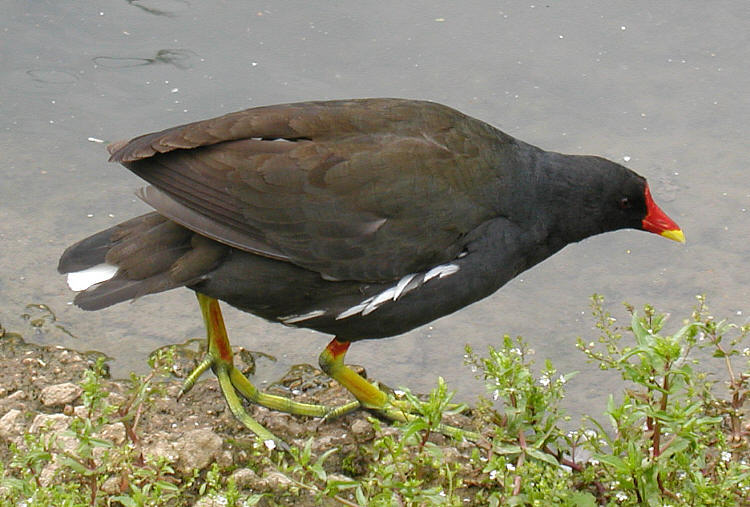
Eurasian moorhen, may have colonized the island naturally after human settlement began

Order: Gruiformes Family: Rallidae

Rallidae is a large family of small to medium-sized birds which includes the rails, crakes, coots and gallinules. Typically they inhabit dense vegetation in damp environments near lakes, swamps or rivers. In general they are shy and secretive birds, making them difficult to observe. Most species have strong legs and long toes which are well adapted to soft uneven surfaces. They tend to have short, rounded wings and to be weak fliers.

- Corn crake, Crex crex (A)
- St. Helena crake, Zapornia astrictocarpus (X)
- Paint-billed crake, Mustelirallus erythrops (A)
- Spotted crake, Porzana porzana (A)
- Eurasian moorhen, Gallinula chloropus
- Red-gartered coot, Fulica armillata (A)
- Red-knobbed coot, Fulica cristata
- Allen's gallinule, Porphyrio alleni (A)
- Purple gallinule, Porphyrio martinicus (A)
- African swamphen, Porphyrio madagascariensis
- St. Helena rail, Aphanocrex podarces (X)

== Sheathbills ==
Order: Charadriiformes Family: Chionididae

The sheathbills are scavengers of the Antarctic regions. They have white plumage and look plump and dove-like but are believed to be similar to the ancestors of the modern gulls and terns.

- Snowy sheathbill, Chionis albus (A)

== Oystercatchers ==
Order: Charadriiformes Family: Haematopodidae

The oystercatchers are large and noisy plover-like birds, with strong bills used for smashing or prising open molluscs.

- Eurasian oystercatcher, Haematopus ostralegus (A)

== Plovers and lapwings ==
Order: Charadriiformes Family: Charadriidae

The family Charadriidae includes the plovers, dotterels and lapwings. They are small to medium-sized birds with compact bodies, short, thick necks and long, usually pointed, wings. They are found in open country worldwide, mostly in habitats near water.

- Black-bellied plover, Pluvialis squatarola (A)
- Blacksmith lapwing, Vanellus armatus (A)
- Greater sand-plover, Anarhynchus leschenaultii (A)
- Kittlitz's plover, Anarhynchus pecuarius
- Common ringed plover, Charadrius hiaticula (A)
- St. Helena plover (known locally as the wirebird), Anarhynchus sanctaehelenae (E)
- Rufous-chested dotterel, Zonibyx modestus (A)

== Jacanas ==
Order: Charadriiformes Family: Jacanidae

The jacanas are a group of tropical waders in the family Jacanidae. They are found throughout the tropics. They are identifiable by their huge feet and claws which enable them to walk on floating vegetation in the shallow lakes that are their preferred habitat.

- African jacana, Actophilornis africanus

== Sandpipers and allies ==
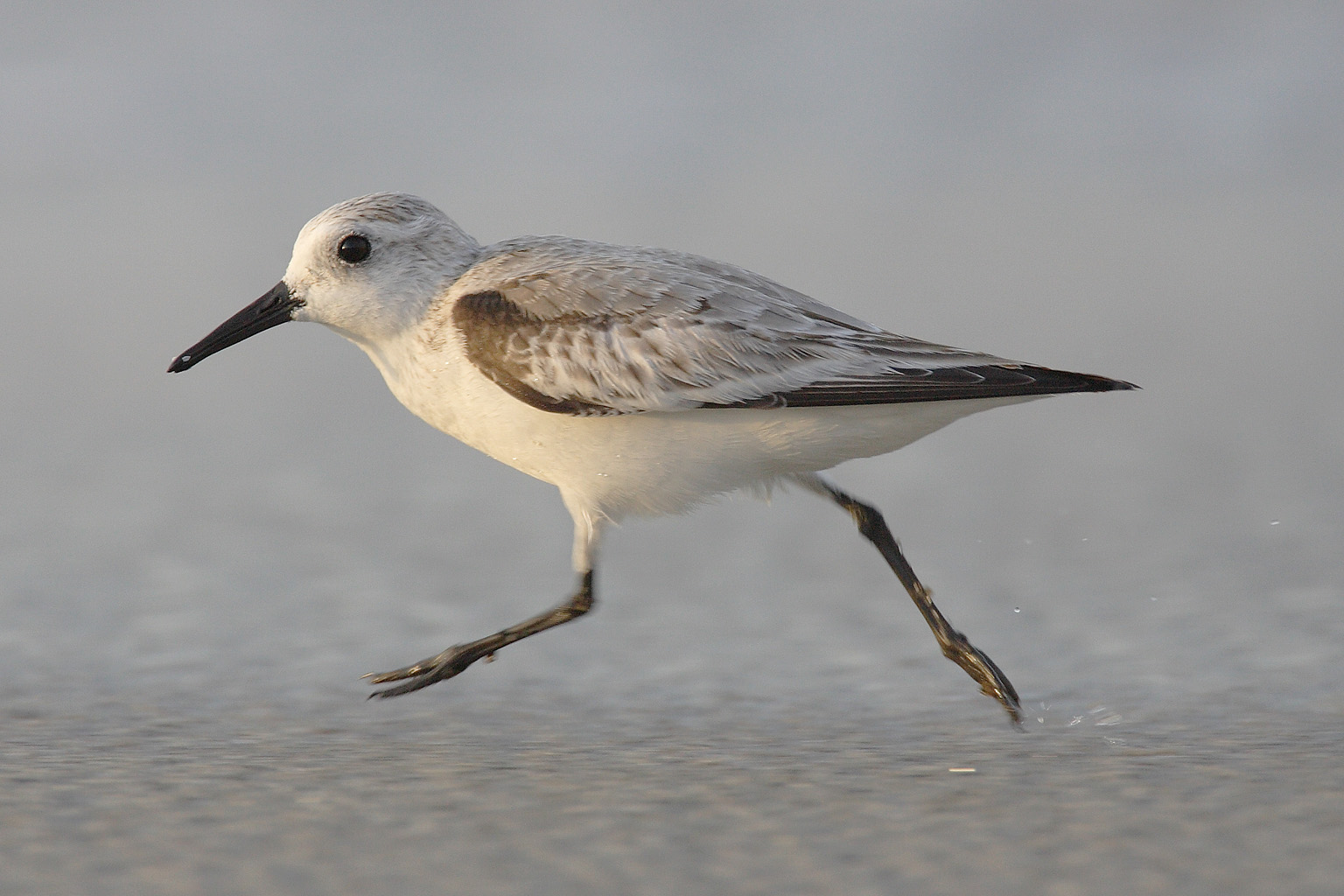
Sanderling, a rare visitor from the Arctic

Order: Charadriiformes Family: Scolopacidae

Scolopacidae is a large diverse family of small to medium-sized shorebirds including the sandpipers, curlews, godwits, shanks, tattlers, woodcocks, snipes, dowitchers and phalaropes. The majority of these species eat small invertebrates picked out of the mud or soil. Variation in length of legs and bills enables multiple species to feed in the same habitat, particularly on the coast, without direct competition for food.

- Upland sandpiper, Bartramia longicauda (A)
- Whimbrel, Numenius phaeopus (A)
- Bar-tailed godwit, Limosa lapponica (A)
- Ruddy turnstone, Arenaria interpres (A)
- Red knot, Calidris canutus (A)
- Ruff, Calidris pugnax (A)
- Sharp-tailed sandpiper, Calidris acuminata (A)
- Sanderling, Calidris alba
- Little stint, Calidris minuta (A)
- White-rumped sandpiper, Calidris fuscicollis (A)
- Pectoral sandpiper, Calidris melanotos (A)
- Semipalmated sandpiper, Calidris pusilla (A)
- Red phalarope, Phalaropus fulicarius (A)
- Common sandpiper, Actitis hypoleucos (A)
- Spotted sandpiper, Actitis macularius (A)
- Green sandpiper, Tringa ochropus (A)
- Solitary sandpiper, Tringa solitaria (A)
- Spotted redshank, Tringa erythropus (A)
- Common greenshank, Tringa nebularia (A)
- Lesser yellowlegs, Tringa flavipes (A)
- Marsh sandpiper, Tringa stagnatilis
- Wood sandpiper, Tringa glareola (A)
- Common redshank, Tringa totanus (A)

== Skuas and jaegers ==
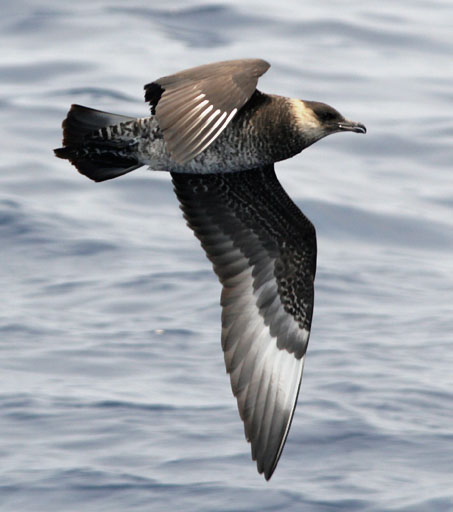
Pomarine jaeger, regular offshore during the northern winter

Order: Charadriiformes Family: Stercorariidae

The family Stercorariidae are, in general, medium to large birds, typically with grey or brown plumage, often with white markings on the wings. They nest on the ground in temperate and arctic regions and are long-distance migrants.

- Great skua, Stercorarius skua (A)
- Brown skua, Stercorarius antarctica
- Chilean skua, Stercorarius chilensis (A)
- South polar skua, Stercorarius maccormicki (A)
- Pomarine jaeger, Stercorarius pomarinus (A)
- Parasitic jaeger, Stercorarius parasiticus (A)
- Long-tailed jaeger, Stercorarius longicaudus (A)

== Gulls, terns, and skimmers ==
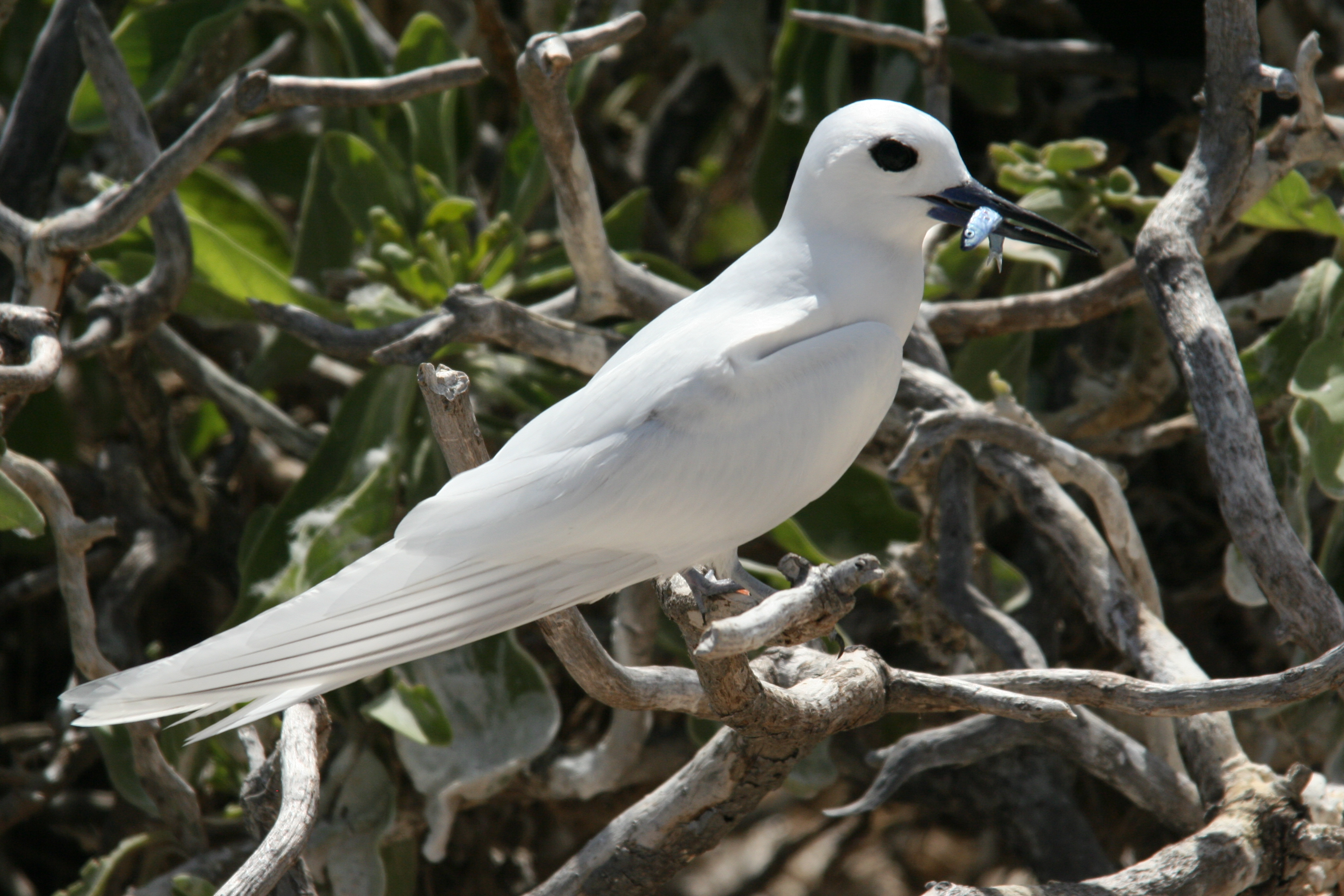
White tern, a common seabird which often nests on buildings

Order: Charadriiformes Family: Laridae

Laridae is a family of medium to large seabirds, the gulls, terns, and skimmers. Gulls are typically grey or white, often with black markings on the head or wings. They have stout, longish bills and webbed feet. Terns are a group of generally medium to large seabirds typically with grey or white plumage, often with black markings on the head. Most terns hunt fish by diving but some pick insects off the surface of fresh water. Terns are generally long-lived birds, with several species known to live in excess of 30 years.

- Franklin's gull, Leucophaeus pipixcan (A)
- Kelp gull, Larus dominicanus (A)
- Brown noddy, Anous stolidus
- Black noddy, Anous minutus
- Lesser noddy, Anous tenuirostris
- White tern, Gygis alba
- Sooty tern, Onychoprion fuscatus
- Arctic tern, Sterna paradisaea (A)
- Antarctic tern, Sterna vittata (A)

== Tropicbirds ==
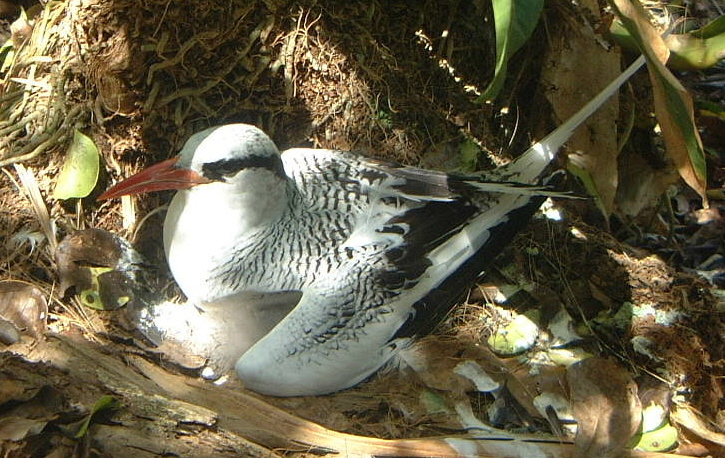
Red-billed tropicbird, nests in loose colonies on sea cliffs

Order: Phaethontiformes Family: Phaethontidae

Tropicbirds are slender white birds of tropical oceans, with exceptionally long central tail feathers. Their heads and long wings have black markings.

- White-tailed tropicbird, Phaethon lepturus (A)
- Red-billed tropicbird, Phaethon aethereus
- Red-tailed tropicbird, Phaethon rubricauda (A)

== Penguins ==
Order: Sphenisciformes Family: Spheniscidae

The penguins are a group of flightless aquatic birds living almost exclusively in the Southern Hemisphere. Most penguins feed on krill, fish, squid, and other forms of marine life caught while swimming underwater.

- King penguin, Aptenodytes patagonicus (A)
- Gentoo penguin, Pygoscelis papua (A)
- Chinstrap penguin, Pygoscelis antarcticus (A)
- African penguin, Spheniscus demersus
- Macaroni penguin, Eudyptes chrysolophus (A)
- Western rockhopper penguin, Eudyptes chrysocome
- Moseley's rockhopper penguin, Eudyptes moseleyi (A)

== Albatrosses ==
Order: Procellariiformes Family: Diomedeidae

The albatrosses are among the largest of flying birds, and the great albatrosses from the genus Diomedea have the largest wingspans of any extant birds.

- Yellow-nosed albatross, Thalassarche chlororhynchos (A)
- Gray-headed albatross, Thalassarche chrysostoma
- White-capped albatross, Thalassarche cauta
- Salvin's albatross, Thalassarche salvini
- Black-browed albatross, Thalassarche melanophris (A)
- Sooty albatross, Phoebetria fusca (A)
- Light-mantled albatross, Phoebetria palpebrata
- Wandering albatross, Diomedea exulans (A)

== Southern storm-petrels ==
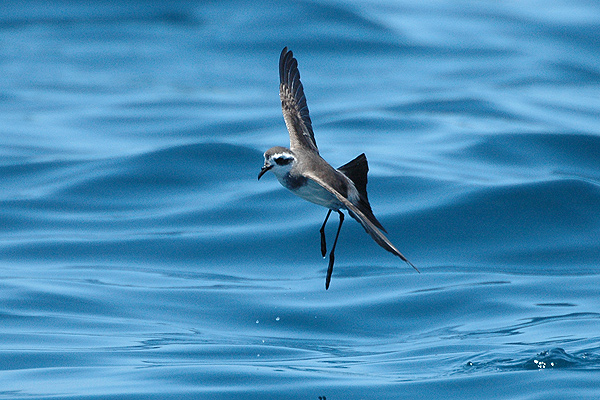
White-faced storm-petrel, a former breeding bird

Order: Procellariiformes Family: Oceanitidae

The southern storm-petrels are relatives of the petrels and are the smallest seabirds. They feed on planktonic crustaceans and small fish picked from the surface, typically while hovering. The flight is fluttering and sometimes bat-like.

- Wilson's storm-petrel, Oceanites oceanicus (A)
- Gray-backed storm-petrel, Garrodia nereis
- White-faced storm-petrel, Pelagodroma marina (A)
- White-bellied storm-petrel, Fregetta grallaria (A)
- Black-bellied storm-petrel, Fregetta tropica (A)

== Northern storm-petrels ==
Order: Procellariiformes Family: Hydrobatidae

Though the members of this family are similar in many respects to the southern storm-petrels, including their general appearance and habits, there are enough genetic differences to warrant their placement in a separate family.

- Leach's storm-petrel, Hydrobates leucorhous
- Band-rumped storm-petrel, Hydrobates castro

== Shearwaters and petrels ==
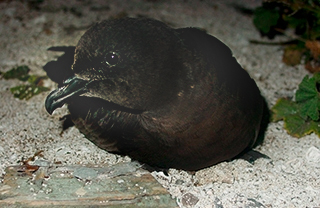
Bulwer's petrel, a possible breeding species

Order: Procellariiformes Family: Procellariidae

The procellariids are the main group of medium-sized "true petrels", characterised by united nostrils with medium septum and a long outer functional primary.

- Southern giant-petrel, Macronectes giganteus
- Northern giant-petrel, Macronectes halli
- Southern fulmar, Fulmarus glacialoides (A)
- Cape petrel, Daption capense (A)
- Kerguelen petrel, Aphrodroma brevirostris
- Large St. Helena petrel, Pterodroma rupinarum (X)
- Great-winged petrel, Pterodroma macroptera
- Trindade petrel, Pterodroma arminjoniana (A)
- Murphy's petrel, Pterodroma ultima (A)
- Soft-plumaged petrel, Pterodroma mollis (A)
- White-headed petrel, Pterodroma lessonii
- Juan Fernandez petrel, Pterodroma externa
- Atlantic petrel, Pterodroma incerta
- Blue petrel, Halobaena caerulea (A)
- Broad-billed prion, Pachyptila vittata (A)
- MacGillivray's prion, Pachyptila macgillivrayi
- Antarctic prion, Pachyptila desolata
- Slender-billed prion, Pachyptila belcheri
- Bulwer's petrel, Bulweria bulwerii (A)
- Small St. Helena petrel, Bulweria bifax (X)
- Gray petrel, Procellaria cinerea
- White-chinned petrel, Procellaria aequinoctialis
- Spectacled petrel, Procellaria conspicillata
- Cory's shearwater, Calonectris diomedea
- Great shearwater, Ardenna gravis
- Sooty shearwater, Ardenna griseus (A)
- St. Helena shearwater, Ardenna pacificoides (X)
- Subantarctic shearwater, Puffinus elegans
- Tropical shearwater, Puffinus bailloni (A)
- Common diving-petrel, Pelecanoides urinatrix

== Storks ==
Order: Ciconiiformes Family: Ciconiidae

Storks are large, long-legged, long-necked, wading birds with long, stout bills. Storks are mute, but bill-clattering is an important mode of communication at the nest. Their nests can be large and may be reused for many years. Many species are migratory.

- White stork, Ciconia ciconia (A)

== Frigatebirds ==
Order: Suliformes Family: Fregatidae

Frigatebirds are large seabirds usually found over tropical oceans. They are large, black and white or completely black, with long wings and deeply forked tails. The males have coloured inflatable throat pouches. They do not swim or walk and cannot take off from a flat surface. Having the largest wingspan-to-body-weight ratio of any bird, they are essentially aerial, able to stay aloft for more than a week.

- Lesser frigatebird, Fregata ariel
- Ascension frigatebird, Fregata aquila
- Great frigatebird, Fregata minor

== Boobies and gannets ==
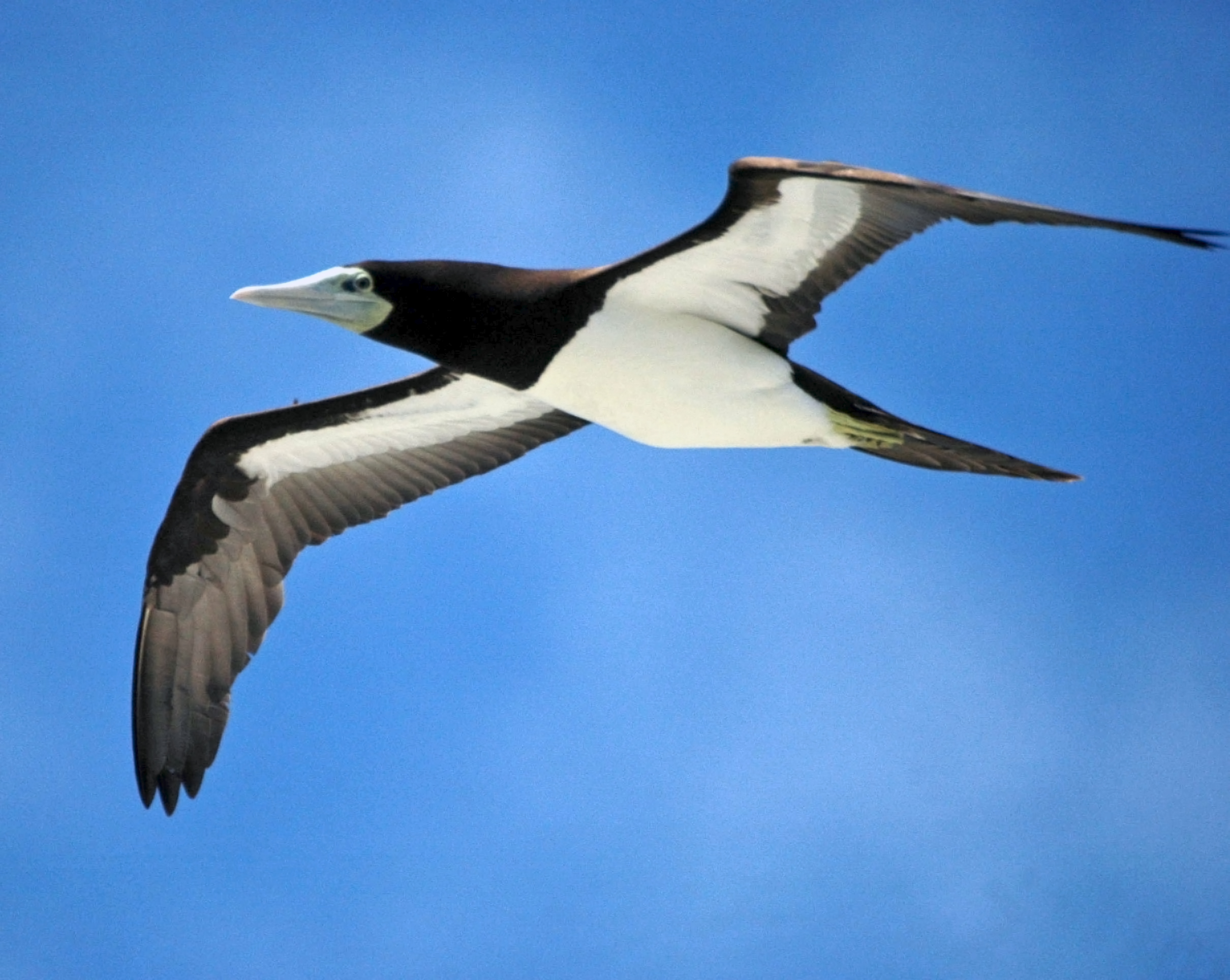
Brown booby, breeds in small numbers

Order: Suliformes Family: Sulidae

The sulids comprise the gannets and boobies. Both groups are medium to large coastal seabirds that plunge-dive for fish.

- Masked booby, Sula dactylatra
- Brown booby, Sula leucogaster
- Red-footed booby, Sula sula (A)
- Cape gannet, Morus capensis

== Herons, egrets, and bitterns ==
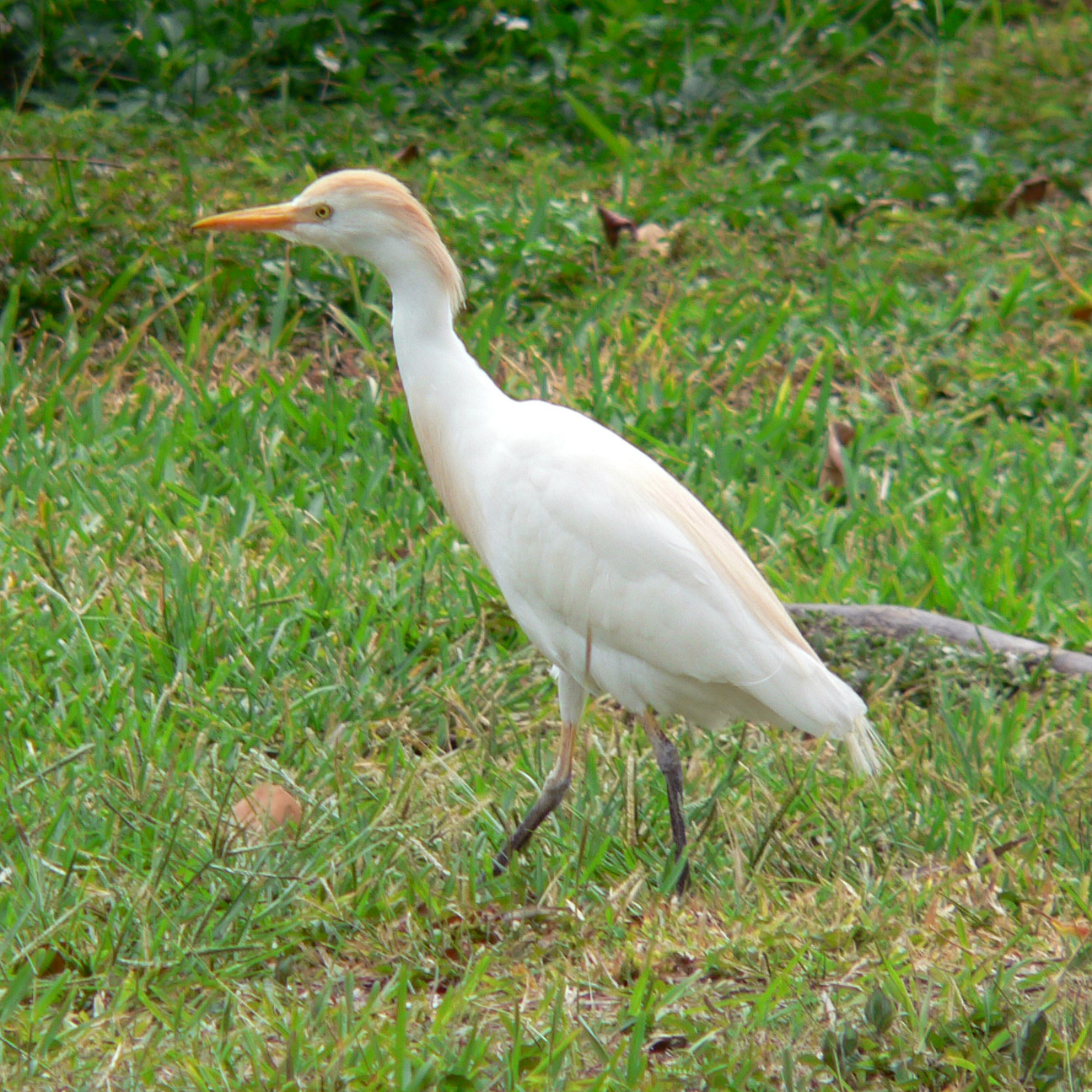
Western cattle egret, a regular migrant in small numbers

Order: Pelecaniformes Family: Ardeidae

The family Ardeidae contains the bitterns, herons and egrets. Herons and egrets are medium to large wading birds with long necks and legs. Bitterns tend to be shorter necked and more wary. Members of Ardeidae fly with their necks retracted, unlike other long-necked birds such as storks, ibises and spoonbills.

- Dwarf bittern, Botaurus sturmii (A)
- Gray heron, Ardea cinerea (A)
- Cocoi heron, Ardea cocoi (A)
- Purple heron, Ardea purpurea (A)
- Great egret, Ardea alba (A)
- Western cattle egret, Ardea ibis (A)
- Snowy egret, Egretta thula (A)
- Little blue heron, Egretta caerulea (A)
- Squacco heron, Ardeola ralloides (A)
- Striated heron, Butorides striata (A)
- Black-crowned night-heron, Nycticorax nycticorax (A)

== Hoopoes ==
Order: Bucerotiformes Family: Upupidae

Hoopoes have black, white and orangey-pink colouring with a large erectile crest on their head.

- St. Helena hoopoe, Upupa antaios (X)

== Rollers ==
Order: Coraciiformes Family: Coraciidae

Rollers resemble crows in size and build, but are more closely related to the kingfishers and bee-eaters. They share the colourful appearance of those groups with blues and browns predominating. The two inner front toes are connected, but the outer toe is not.

- European roller, Coracias garrulus (A)

== Falcons ==
Order: Falconiformes Family: Falconidae

Falconidae is a family of diurnal birds of prey. They differ from hawks, eagles and kites in that they kill with their beaks instead of their talons.

- Red-footed falcon, Falco vespertinus (A)
- Amur falcon, Falco amurensis (A)

== Cockatoos ==
Order: Psittaciformes Family: Cacatuidae

The cockatoos share many features with other parrots including the characteristic curved beak shape and a zygodactyl foot, with two forward toes and two backwards toes. They differ, however in a number of characteristics, including the often spectacular movable headcrest.

- Galah, Eolophus roseicapilla (I)

== Tyrant flycatchers ==
Order: Passeriformes Family: Tyrannidae

Tyrant flycatchers are Passerine birds which occur throughout North and South America. They superficially resemble the Old World flycatchers, but are more robust and have stronger bills. They do not have the sophisticated vocal capabilities of the songbirds. Most, but not all, are rather plain. As the name implies, most are insectivorous.

- Eastern kingbird, Tyrannus tyrannus (A)

== Shrikes ==
Order: Passeriformes Family: Laniidae

Shrikes are passerine birds known for their habit of catching other birds and small animals and impaling the uneaten portions of their bodies on thorns. A shrike's beak is hooked, like that of a typical bird of prey.

- Red-backed shrike, Lanius collurio (A)

== Larks ==
Order: Passeriformes Family: Alaudidae

Larks are small terrestrial birds with often extravagant songs and display flights. Most larks are fairly dull in appearance. Their food is insects and seeds.

- Eurasian skylark, Alauda arvensis

== Swallows ==
Order: Passeriformes Family: Hirundinidae

The family Hirundinidae is adapted to aerial feeding. They have a slender streamlined body, long pointed wings and a short bill with a wide gape. The feet are adapted to perching rather than walking, and the front toes are partially joined at the base.

- Bank swallow, Riparia riparia (A)
- Barn swallow, Hirundo rustica (A)
- Cliff swallow, Petrochelidon pyrrhonota (A)
- Western house-martin, Delichon urbicum (A)

== Leaf warblers ==
Order: Passeriformes Family: Phylloscopidae

Leaf warblers are a family of small insectivorous birds found mostly in Eurasia and ranging into Wallacea and Africa. The species are of various sizes, often green-plumaged above and yellow below, or more subdued with grayish-green to grayish-brown colors.

- Willow warbler, Phylloscopus trochilus (A)

== Starlings ==
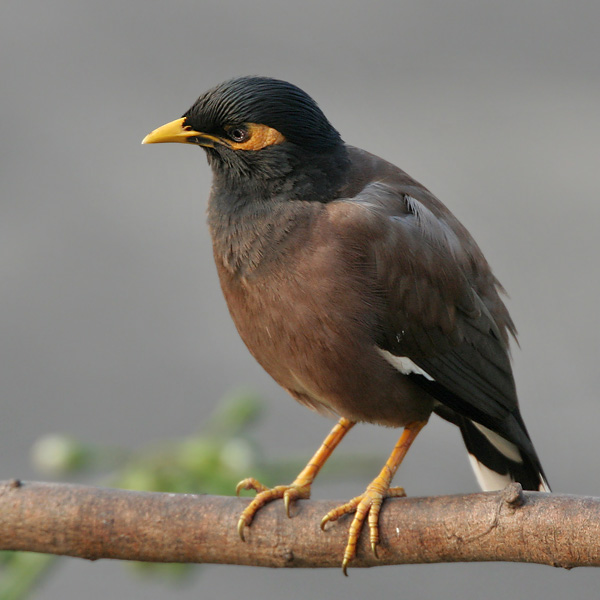
Common myna, an Indian bird first introduced in 1815 and again in 1885

Order: Passeriformes Family: Sturnidae

Starlings are small to medium-sized passerine birds. Their flight is strong and direct and they are very gregarious. Their preferred habitat is fairly open country. They eat insects and fruit. Plumage is typically dark with a metallic sheen.

- Common hill myna, Gracula religiosa (I)
- European starling, Sturnus vulgaris (I)
- Common myna, Acridotheres tristis (I)

== Thrushes and allies ==
Order: Passeriformes Family: Turdidae

The thrushes are a group of passerine birds that occur mainly in the Old World. They are plump, soft plumaged, small to medium-sized insectivores or sometimes omnivores, often feeding on the ground. Many have attractive songs.

- Song thrush, Turdus philomelos
- Eurasian blackbird, Turdus merula

== Old World flycatchers ==
Order: Passeriformes Family: Muscicapidae

Old World flycatchers are a large group of small passerine birds native to the Old World. They are mainly small arboreal insectivores. The appearance of these birds is highly varied, but they mostly have weak songs and harsh calls.

- European robin, Erithacus rubecula

== Weavers and allies ==
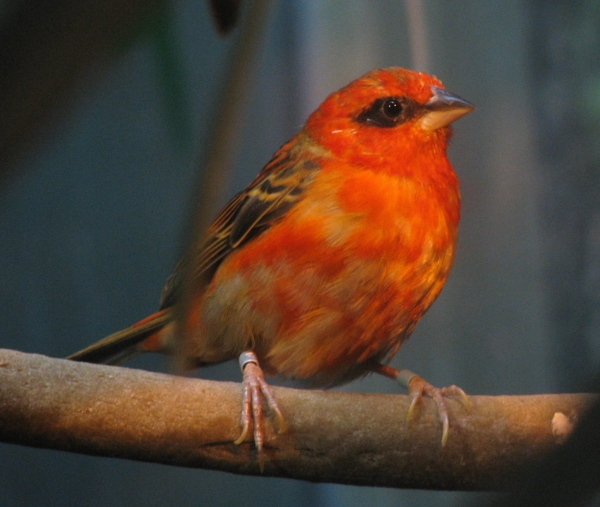
Red fody, a common introduced species

Order: Passeriformes Family: Ploceidae

The weavers are small passerine birds related to the finches. They are seed-eating birds with rounded conical bills. The males of many species are brightly coloured, usually in red or yellow and black, some species show variation in colour only in the breeding season.

- Scaly weaver, Sporopipes squamifrons (I)
- Red fody, Foudia madagascariensis (I)
- Southern red bishop, Euplectes orix (I)
- White-winged widowbird, Euplectes albonotatus (I)
- Long-tailed widowbird, Euplectes progne (I)

== Waxbills and allies ==
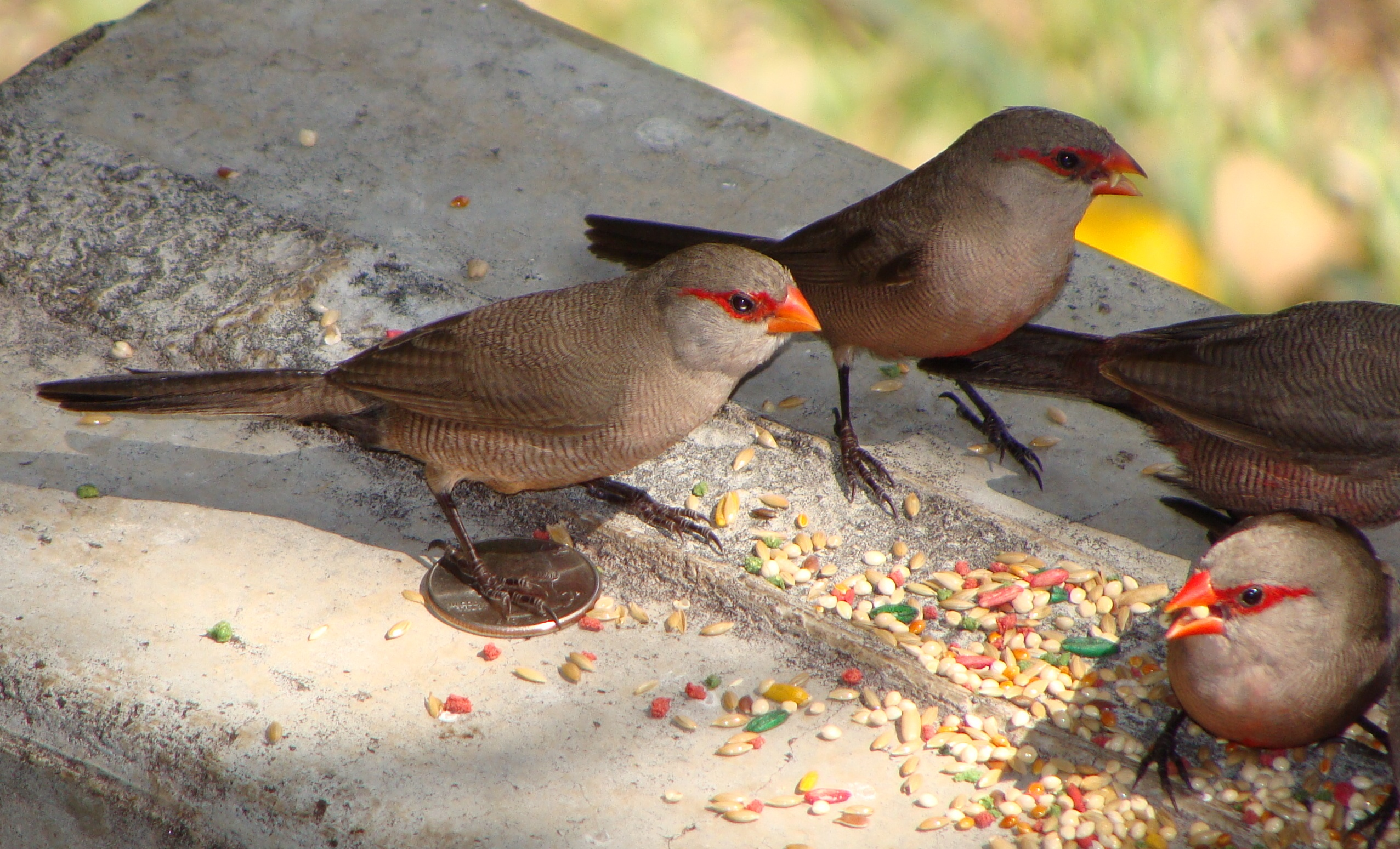
Common waxbills - many were exported from the island for the cagebird trade.

Order: Passeriformes Family: Estrildidae

The estrildid finches are small passerine birds of the Old World tropics and Australasia. They are gregarious and often colonial seed eaters with short thick but pointed bills. They are all similar in structure and habits, but have wide variation in plumage colours and patterns.

- Java sparrow, Padda oryzivora (I)
- Black-faced waxbill, Brunhilda erythronotos (I)
- Common waxbill, Estrilda astrild (I)
- Violet-eared waxbill, Granatina granatina (I)
- Southern cordonbleu, Uraeginthus angolensis
- Green-winged pytilia, Pytilia melba (I)

== Indigobirds ==
Order: Passeriformes Family: Viduidae

The indigobirds are finch-like species which usually have black or indigo predominating in their plumage. All are brood parasites, which lay their eggs in the nests of estrildid finches.

- Eastern paradise-whydah, Vidua paradisaea (I)
- Shaft-tailed whydah, Vidua regia (I)

== Old World sparrows ==
Order: Passeriformes Family: Passeridae

Old World sparrows are small passerine birds. In general, sparrows tend to be small, plump, brown or grey birds with short tails and short powerful beaks. Sparrows are seed eaters, but they also consume small insects.

- House sparrow, Passer domesticus (I)

== Finches, euphonias, and allies ==
Order: Passeriformes Family: Fringillidae

Finches are seed-eating passerine birds, that are small to moderately large and have a strong beak, usually conical and in some species very large. All have twelve tail feathers and nine primaries. These birds have a bouncing flight with alternating bouts of flapping and gliding on closed wings, and most sing well.

- Common chaffinch, Fringilla coelebs
- European greenfinch, Chloris chloris
- Yellow-fronted canary, Crithagra mozambica (I)
- Brimstone canary, Crithagra sulphurata (I)
- Yellow canary, Crithagra flaviventris (I)
- European goldfinch, Carduelis carduelis
- European serin, Serinus serinus (I)
- Island canary, Serinus canaria (I)
- Cape canary, Serinus canicollis

== See also ==
- List of birds
- Lists of birds by region
