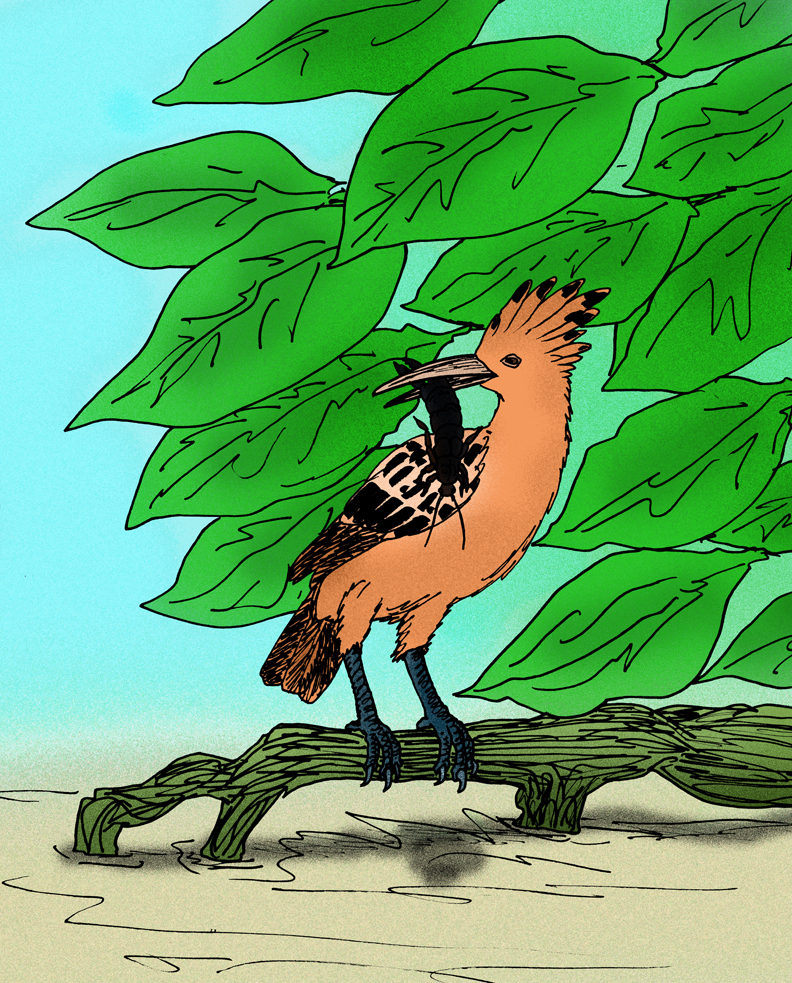

Conservation status
- Extinct (Early 16th century) (IUCN 3.1)

Scientific classification
- Kingdom: Animalia
- Phylum: Chordata
- Class: Aves
- Order: Bucerotiformes
- Family: Upupidae
- Genus: Upupa
- Species: †U. antaios

Binomial name
- †Upupa antaios Olson, 1975
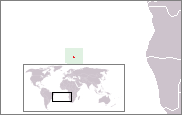
- Location of Saint Helena

Synonyms
- Upupa antaois (lapsus)

= Saint Helena hoopoe =

Saint Helena hoopoe Temporal range: Holocene

Extinct species of bird

The Saint Helena hoopoe (Upupa antaios), also known as the Saint Helena giant hoopoe or giant hoopoe, is an extinct species of hoopoe (family Upupidae) known exclusively from an incomplete subfossil skeleton. Once endemic to the island of Saint Helena, it was last seen around 1550, likely driven to extinction by various aspects of human activity.

== Description ==
The Saint Helena hoopoe was a large bird, with heavier and more robust skull and leg elements than the Eurasian or common hoopoe (Upupa epops), of which it is a likely descendant. In opposition, the distal wing bones were much smaller than those of modern hoopoes. This and other clues indicate that it was almost certainly flightless. A height cannot be estimated based upon the incomplete skeleton; however, a likely weight range of 101–145 grams has been posited, using several skeletal aspects from the chest region comparable to the common hoopoe (which weighs 46–89 grams). Coloration and markings are unknown, but anatomical similarities to modern hoopoe species make visual similarities plausible.

== Ecology ==
Before its extinction, the Saint Helena hoopoe was endemic to the island of Saint Helena in the southern Atlantic Ocean, hence its name. When it was still extant, the areas in which it lived were likely scrubwoods, consisting of a desert environment with shrub-adjacent plant life; in fact, the presence of its remains in the region serves as evidence for such an environment in the past, given that hoopoes in general occupy grasslands and open woodlands. In such an environment, the Saint Helena hoopoe could have been a predator of the Saint Helena earwig (Labidura herculeana), which is also extinct. Otherwise, assumptions can be made that the Saint Helena hoopoe was similar to extant species, but little else is known.

Other extinct endemic birds of Saint Helena include the Saint Helena rail, the Saint Helena crake, the Saint Helena dove, and the Saint Helena cuckoo. (Of these, the dove was also likely flightless.) The extinct seabirds of Saint Helena include the Saint Helena bulweria, the Saint Helena petrel, and the Saint Helena shearwater. No extant species of hoopoe is present on Saint Helena.

=== Extinction ===
The extinction of the Saint Helena hoopoe is directly attributable to the effects of colonization, including the introduction of predators like rats and cats, as well as being hunted by humans. The Saint Helena hoopoe was a flightless bird, and so would have had few avenues of escape when confronted by unfamiliar predators. Habitat destruction also played a part. Given the various pressures facing the species, it was not likely to have survived for long past the discovery of Saint Helena island in 1502; its final recorded sighting was in 1550, though it may have lasted into 1640.

== Taxonomy ==
The family Upupidae contains only a single genus, Upupa, with three living species. The common hoopoe, Upupa epops, is the closest living relative of the Saint Helena hoopoe. The Saint Helena hoopoe is the only extinct species of hoopoe to have been identified; another extinct congener was once recognized from Europe, Upupa phoeniculides, but the features thought to differentiate it from modern hoopoes were found not to indicate speciation but instead whether a population was from Europe or Africa.

=== Etymology and nomenclature ===
The Saint Helena hoopoe has only ever gone by the scientific name Upupa antaios, and has no known synonyms. The name "antaios" is a reference to Greek mythology; the wrestler Antaios was a son of Gaia, and could only maintain his strength when in contact with the ground. Storrs L. Olson, who described the Saint Helena hoopoe, drew parallels between the new species and the wrestler – "likewise a giant of its kind and as necessarily committed to the earth".

Common names for the Saint Helena hoopoe in various languages remark upon either its size or its origin. "Abubilla gigante" (Cebuano) and Kæmpehærfugl (Danish) both mean "giant hoopoe"; "huppe de Sainte-hélène" (French) and "sankthelenahärfågel" (Swedish) both mean "Saint Helena hoopoe".

== History ==
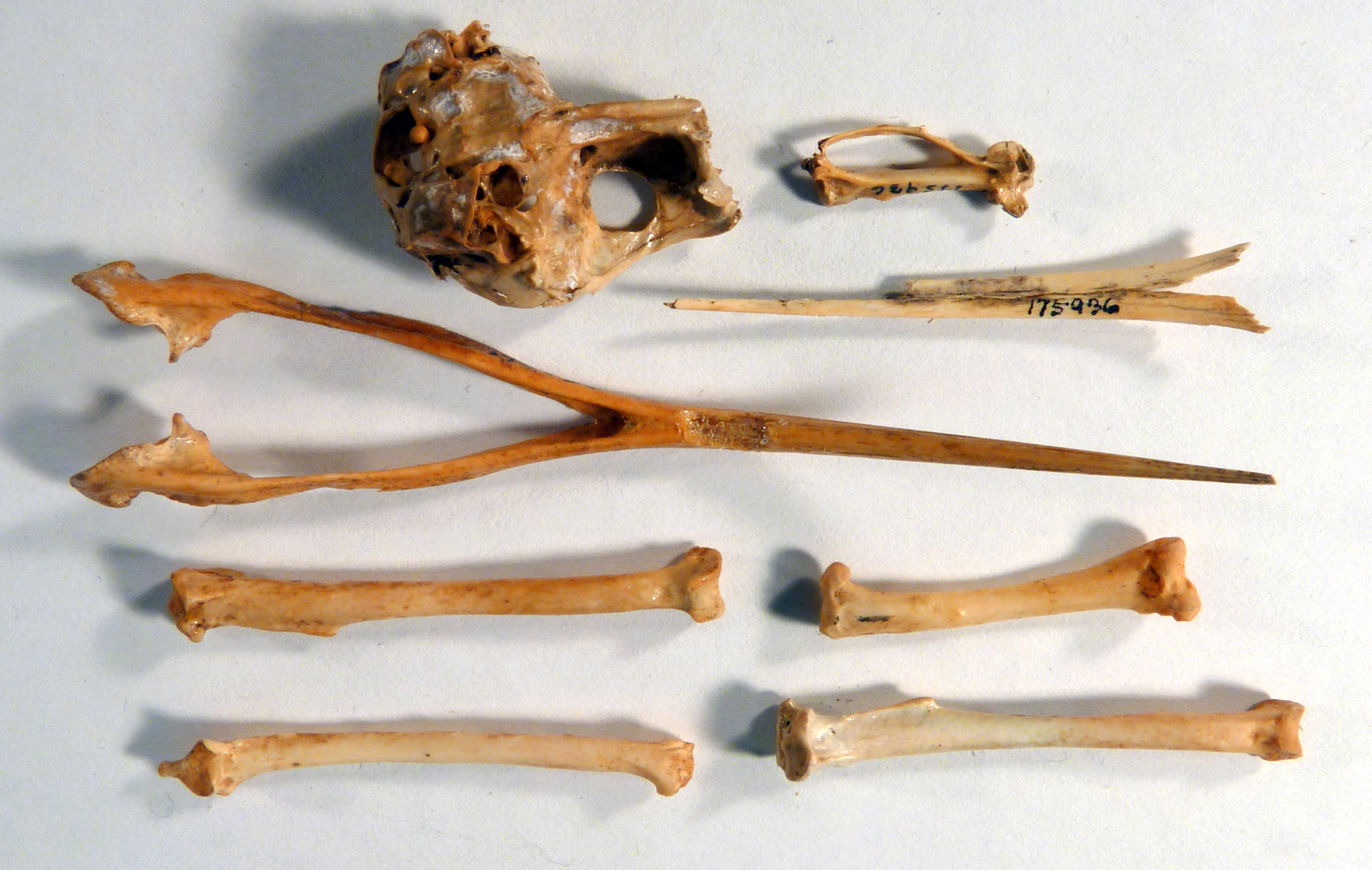
Upupa antaios original specimen from the Smithsonian

The first evidence of this species was discovered in 1963 by the British zoologist Philip Ashmole in the Dry Gut sediments east of Saint Helena. Ashmole found a left humerus, but assumed it to be of a common hoopoe, due to remarkable similarities to known hoopoe species. However, further research in 1975 by American paleontologist Storrs L. Olson unearthed more remains, including coracoids, skull elements, and the left femur, which prompted a reexamination of the older evidence and the nomination of a new species.

The British Museum of Natural History, as of 1977, was in possession of at least one femur from a Saint Helena hoopoe, slightly larger than Olson described in the nominal paper.
