= Scrubwood =

Scrubwood may refer to:

- Commidendrum rugosum, a flowering plant from St Helena
- Scrubwood, Buckinghamshire, a hamlet in England
