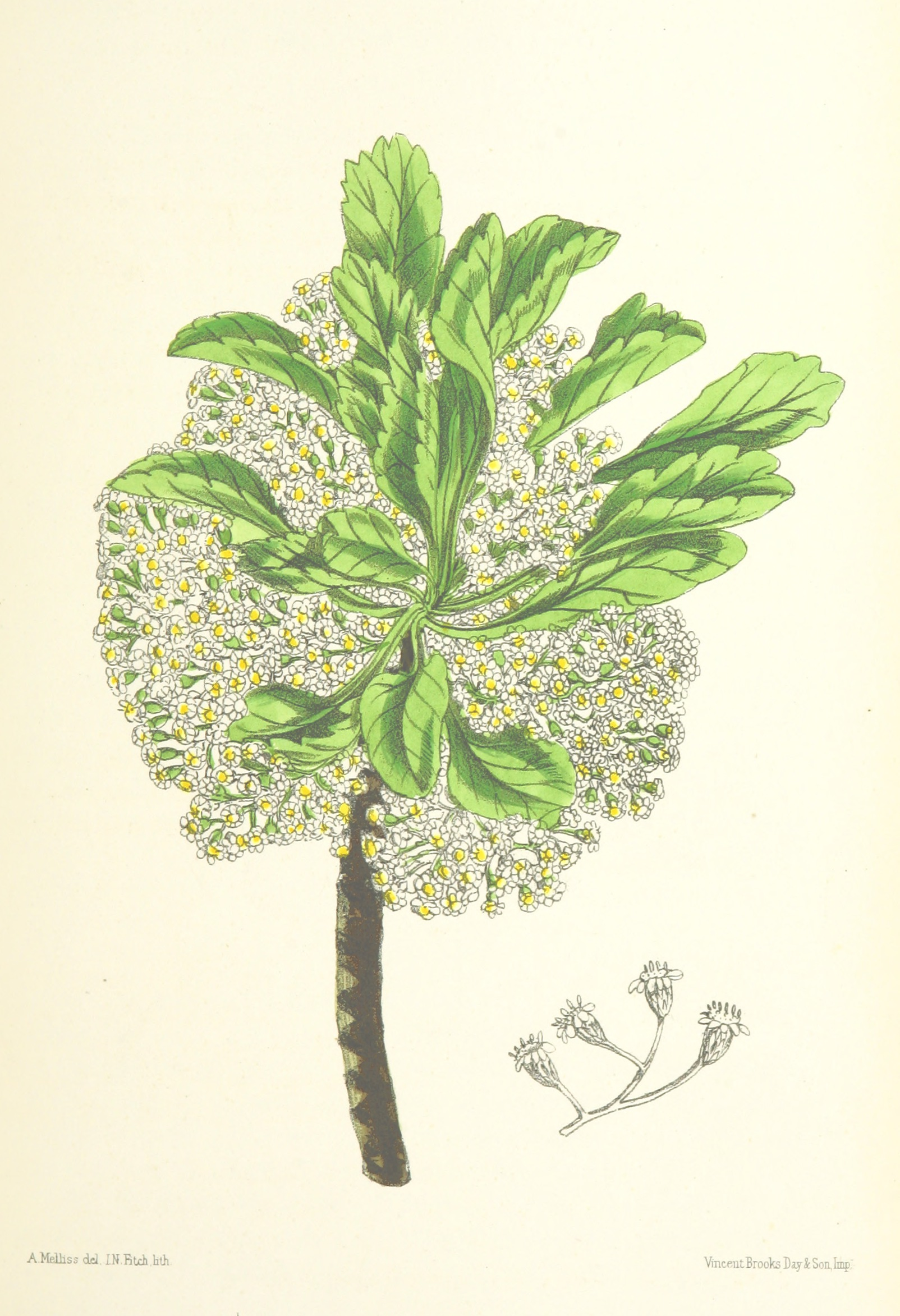

Conservation status
- Critically Endangered (IUCN 3.1)

Scientific classification
- Kingdom: Plantae
- Clade: Embryophytes
- Clade: Tracheophytes
- Clade: Spermatophytes
- Clade: Angiosperms
- Clade: Eudicots
- Clade: Asterids
- Order: Asterales
- Family: Asteraceae
- Genus: Commidendrum
- Species: C. rotundifolium

Binomial name
- Commidendrum rotundifolium (Roxb.) DC.

Synonyms
- Solidago rotundifolia Roxb.; Psiadia rotundifolia (Roxb.) Hook.f.

= Commidendrum rotundifolium =

Bastard gumwood

Species of flowering plant

Commidendrum rotundifolium, the bastard gumwood, is a species of tree endemic to the island of Saint Helena. It was thought to be extinct, but one last tree was discovered in Horse Pasture in 1982. This tree, long believed to be the last, was destroyed in 1986 by a gale. However seedlings were grown from this tree before it perished. The last of these to survive in cultivation was damaged by gales in 2008 and the survival of the species was in doubt.

In December 2009, Lourens Malan, a horticulturist working for the island's conservation department under the Critical Species Recovery Project, discovered a wild tree growing on a cliff. A local team of botanists, conservationists and volunteers commenced an intensive programme of hand pollination and seed collection of the remaining cultivated tree, while protecting it from insects that may cross-pollinate with nearby false gumwoods. Successful fertilisation will occur only if any grains of pollen happen to have mutations that will suppress the tree's mechanisms for preventing self-pollination.

With funding from DEFRA an intensive propagation and nursery programme has demonstrated that a low percentage (0.2%) of viable seed can be generated by this method, and as of October 2010, 250 seedlings have been grown for the recovery of the species.

The gumwood tree is most closely related to sunflowers and evidently evolved from sunflowers that somehow drifted across the Atlantic to St. Helena and filled the tree niche. No other tree species is found in St. Helena, therefore sunflowers took the opportunity to fill in that niche.
