= Helenoconcha relicta =

Conservation status
- Critically Endangered (IUCN 3.1)

Scientific classification
- Kingdom: Animalia
- Phylum: Mollusca
- Class: Gastropoda
- Order: Stylommatophora
- Family: Charopidae
- Genus: Helenoconcha
- Species: H. relicta

Binomial name
- Helenoconcha relicta (Solem, 1977)

Species of gastropod

The Ammonite Snail (Helenoconcha relicta) is a species of small air-breathing land snails, terrestrial pulmonate gastropod mollusks in the family Charopidae. It is endemic to Saint Helena, and is the only Helenoconcha species remaining.

== Taxonomy ==
The species was first discovered in 1967 by the members of the Belgian entomological expedition, and was eventually described by George Alan Solem in 1977. The epithet of the species' scientific name, relicta, translates to "relict", as it was reportedly the only Helenoconcha species recorded during the expedition.

== Distribution ==
The snail is endemic to the island of Saint Helena, where it has been mainly recorded high up in the wet, mountainous cloud forests of the central ridge. It is often found on Saint Helena tree ferns and jellico plants. However, a specimen has also been observed on a gumwood tree in lower elevations.

== Conservation ==
After the species' discovery in 1967, the species disappeared and was presumed to be extinct, just like all the other species of the genus Helenoconcha, until its rediscovery on Diana's Peak in 2005-06. This makes it the sole surviving species of its genus.

The species likely continues to be threatened by habitat loss and invasive species, especially introduced plants that outcompete native plants, like the New Zealand flax. Introduced predators like the centipede Scolopendra morsitans are also thought to predate the snail, and it is likely that the entire species is dependent on conservation efforts for long-term survival.
