= Helenodiscus =

Scientific classification
- Kingdom: Animalia
- Phylum: Mollusca
- Class: Gastropoda
- Order: Stylommatophora
- Family: Charopidae
- Genus: Helenodiscus; Solem, 1977

Genus of gastropods

Helenodiscus was a genus of small air-breathing land snails, terrestrial pulmonate gastropod mollusks in the family Charopidae. Both species were declared extinct by the IUCN in 1996.

== Species ==
Species within the genus Helenodiscus include:

- Helenodiscus bilamellata
- Helenodiscus vernoni
