= Helenoconcha =

Scientific classification
- Kingdom: Animalia
- Phylum: Mollusca
- Class: Gastropoda
- Order: Stylommatophora
- Family: Charopidae
- Genus: Helenoconcha

Genus of gastropods

Helenoconcha is a genus of small air-breathing land snails, terrestrial pulmonate gastropod mollusks in the family Charopidae endemic to the island of Saint Helena, hence the genetic epithet. All species save for H. relicta, are extinct.

== Species ==
Species within the genus Helenoconcha include:

- Helenoconcha leptalea
- Helenoconcha minutissima
- Helenoconcha polyodon
- Helenoconcha pseustes
- Helenoconcha relicta
- Helenoconcha sexdentata
