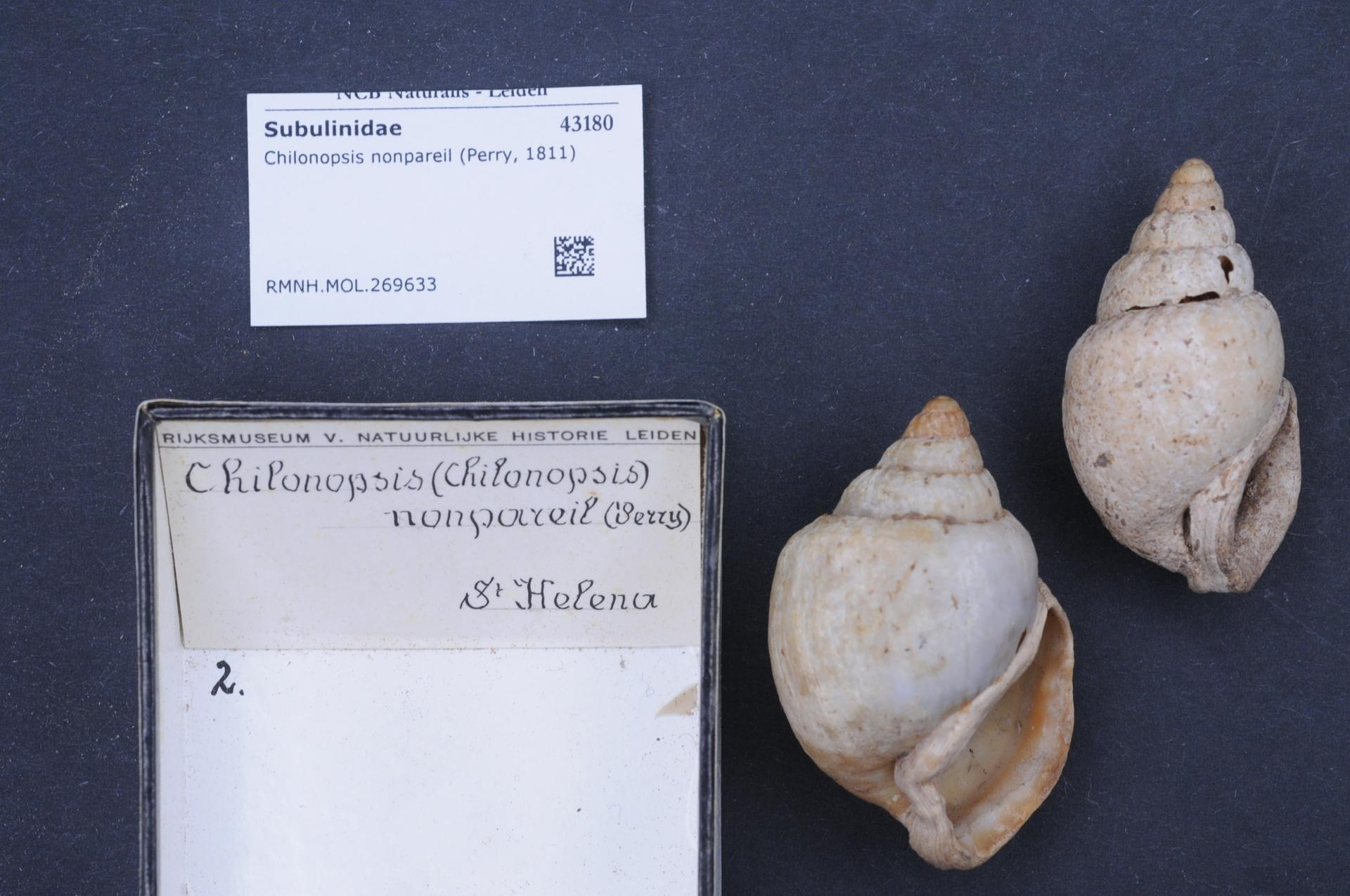
- Chilonopsis nonpareil

Scientific classification
- Kingdom: Animalia
- Phylum: Mollusca
- Class: Gastropoda
- Order: Stylommatophora
- Family: Achatinidae
- Subfamily: Petriolinae
- Genus: †Chilonopsis; Fischer de Waldheim, 1848

= Chilonopsis =

Extinct genus of gastropods

Chilonopsis is an extinct genus of air-breathing land snails, terrestrial pulmonate gastropod molluscs in the family Achatinidae. All species were found on Saint Helena

== Species ==
Ten species, including one disputed, have been described. However, most of these species are only known from subfossil remains, and only two species, namely Chilonopsis turtoni and Chilonopsis melanoides, are known to have survived into modern times.

Species within the genus Chilonopsis include:

- Chilonopsis blofeldi
- Chilonopsis exulatus
- Chilonopsis helena
- Chilonopsis melanoides
- Chilonopsis nonpareil
- Chilonopsis subplicatus
- Chilonopsis subtruncatus
- Chilonopsis turtoni
