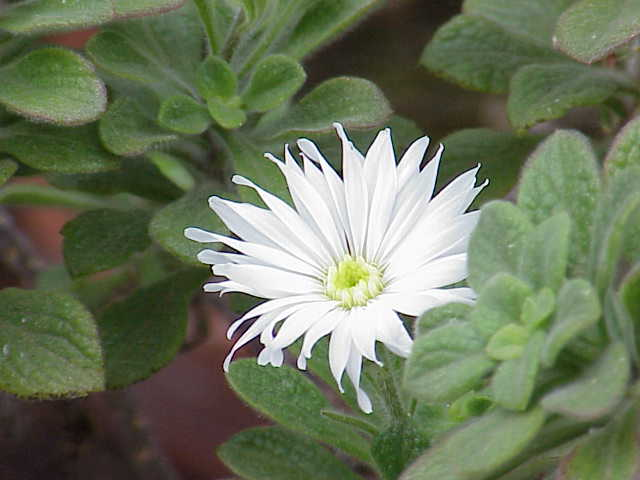

Conservation status
- Vulnerable (IUCN 3.1)

Scientific classification
- Kingdom: Plantae
- Clade: Embryophytes
- Clade: Tracheophytes
- Clade: Spermatophytes
- Clade: Angiosperms
- Clade: Eudicots
- Clade: Asterids
- Order: Asterales
- Family: Asteraceae
- Genus: Commidendrum
- Species: C. rugosum

Binomial name
- Commidendrum rugosum (Dryand) DC.

= Commidendrum rugosum =

Species of flowering plant

Commidendrum rugosum, known as scrubwood, is a species of flowering plant in the family Asteraceae.

== Description ==
The plant is endemic to the island of Saint Helena, off the coast of Africa.

Its natural habitats are subtropical or tropical dry shrubland, rocky areas, and rocky shores.

It is an IUCN Red List Vulnerable species, threatened by habitat loss.
