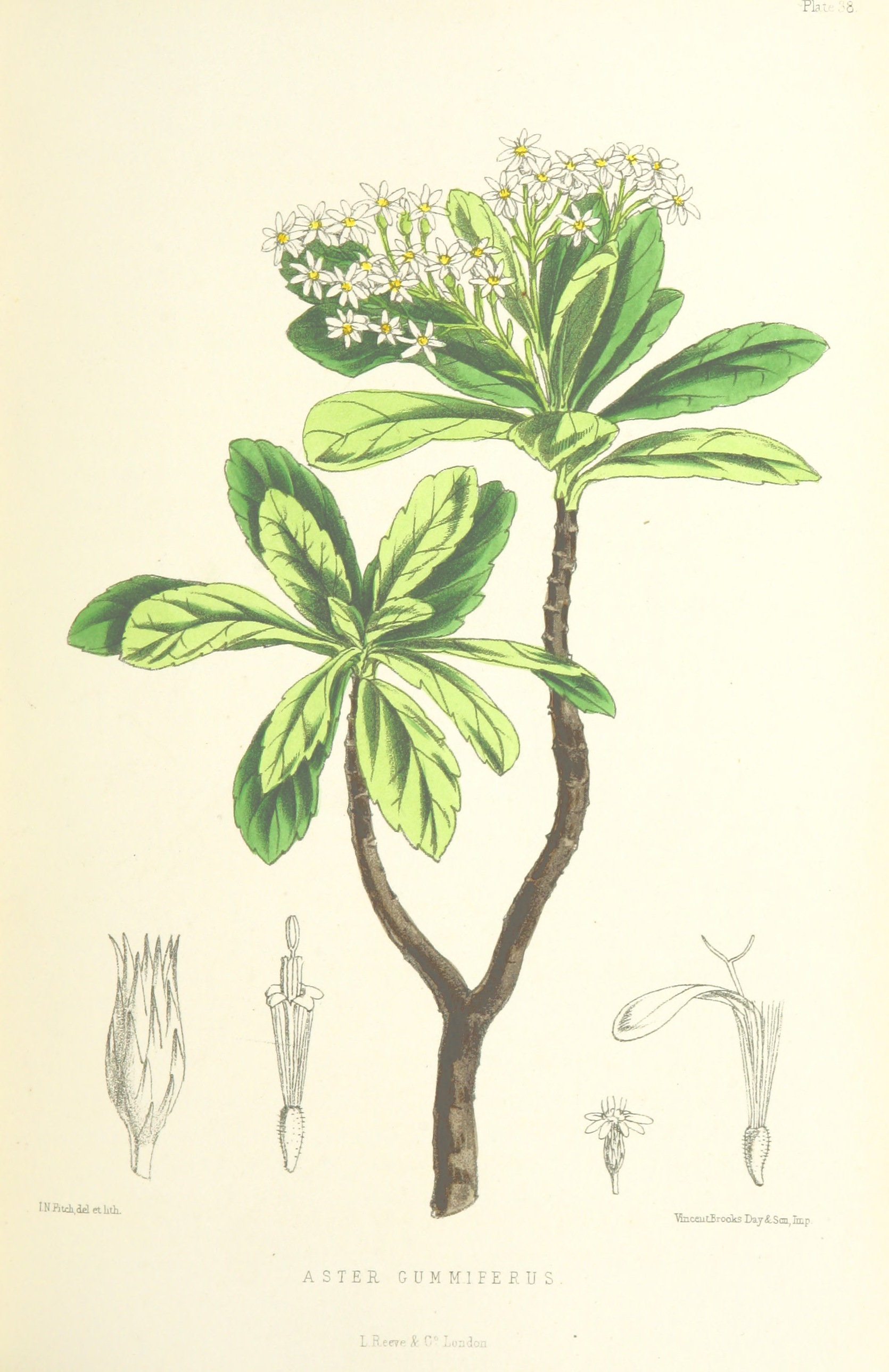

Conservation status
- Critically Endangered (IUCN 3.1)

Scientific classification
- Kingdom: Plantae
- Clade: Embryophytes
- Clade: Tracheophytes
- Clade: Spermatophytes
- Clade: Angiosperms
- Clade: Eudicots
- Clade: Asterids
- Order: Asterales
- Family: Asteraceae
- Genus: Commidendrum
- Species: C. spurium

Binomial name
- Commidendrum spurium (G.Forst.) DC.

= Commidendrum spurium =

Species of flowering plant

Commidendrum spurium, the false gumwood, is a species of flowering plant in the family Asteraceae. It is found only in Saint Helena. Its natural habitats are subtropical or tropical moist lowland forests, rocky areas, and rocky shores. It is threatened by habitat loss.
