= Helenoconcha leptalea =

Conservation status
- Extinct (IUCN 2.3)

Scientific classification
- Kingdom: Animalia
- Phylum: Mollusca
- Class: Gastropoda
- Order: Stylommatophora
- Family: Charopidae
- Genus: Helenoconcha
- Species: †H. leptalea

Binomial name
- †Helenoconcha leptalea Smith, 1892

Extinct species of gastropod

†Helenoconcha leptalea is an extinct species of small air-breathing land snails, terrestrial pulmonate gastropod mollusks in the family Charopidae.

This species was endemic to Saint Helena. It is now extinct.
