= Chilonopsis helena =

Conservation status
- Extinct (IUCN 3.1)

Scientific classification
- Kingdom: Animalia
- Phylum: Mollusca
- Class: Gastropoda
- Order: Stylommatophora
- Family: Achatinidae
- Genus: †Chilonopsis
- Species: †C. helena

Binomial name
- †Chilonopsis helena Quoy & Gaimard, 1833

Extinct species of gastropod

Chilonopsis helena is an extinct species of air-breathing land snails, terrestrial pulmonate gastropod mollusks in the family Achatinidae. This species was endemic to Saint Helena. It is now extinct.
