= Helenoconcha polyodon =

Conservation status
- Extinct (IUCN 2.3)

Scientific classification
- Kingdom: Animalia
- Phylum: Mollusca
- Class: Gastropoda
- Order: Stylommatophora
- Family: Charopidae
- Genus: Helenoconcha
- Species: †H. polyodon

Binomial name
- †Helenoconcha polyodon Sowerby, 1844

Species of gastropod

Helenoconcha polyodon was a species of small air-breathing land snails, terrestrial pulmonate gastropod mollusks in the family Charopidae.

This species was endemic to Saint Helena. It is now extinct.
