= Chilonopsis turtoni =

Conservation status
- Extinct (1884-86) (IUCN 2.3)

Scientific classification
- Kingdom: Animalia
- Phylum: Mollusca
- Class: Gastropoda
- Order: Stylommatophora
- Family: Achatinidae
- Genus: †Chilonopsis
- Species: †C. turtoni

Binomial name
- †Chilonopsis turtoni Smith, 1892

Species of gastropod

Chilonopsis turtoni was a species of air-breathing land snails, terrestrial pulmonate gastropod mollusks in the family Achatinidae. This species was endemic to Saint Helena. It was last seen alive between 1884 and 1886 is now considered extinct. It was also the last species within its genus to go extinct.
