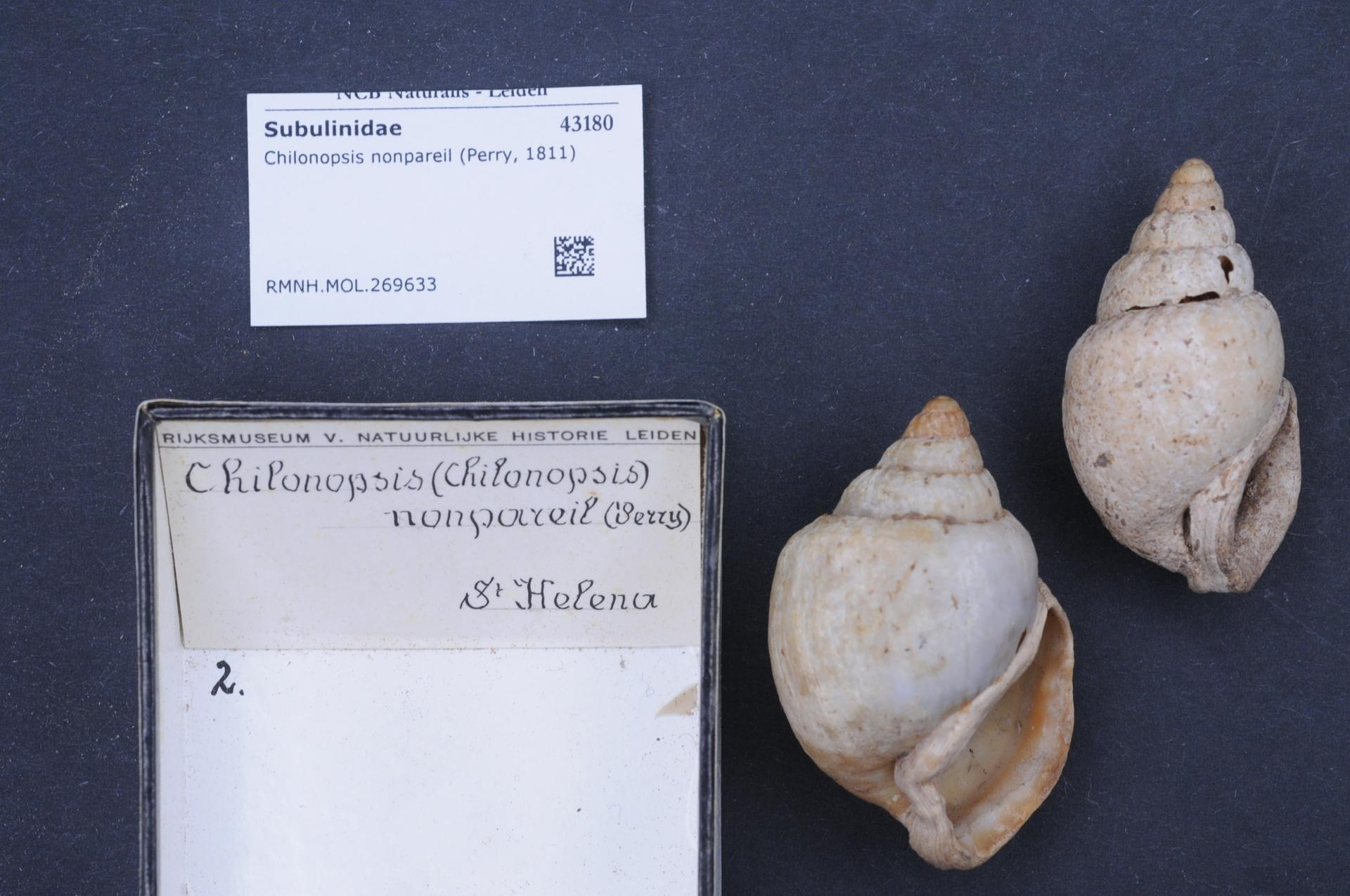
- The specimen in Naturalis Biodiversity Center

Conservation status
- Extinct (1870) (IUCN 3.1)

Scientific classification
- Kingdom: Animalia
- Phylum: Mollusca
- Class: Gastropoda
- Order: Stylommatophora
- Family: Achatinidae
- Genus: †Chilonopsis
- Species: †C. nonpareil

Binomial name
- †Chilonopsis nonpareil Perry, 1811

= Chilonopsis nonpareil =

Extinct species of gastropod

Chilonopsis nonpareil is an extinct species of air-breathing land snails, terrestrial pulmonate gastropod mollusks in the family Achatinidae. This species was endemic to Saint Helena. It is now extinct and was last seen in 1870.
