= Chilonopsis melanoides =

Conservation status
- Extinct (1878) (IUCN 2.3)

Scientific classification
- Kingdom: Animalia
- Phylum: Mollusca
- Class: Gastropoda
- Order: Stylommatophora
- Family: Achatinidae
- Genus: †Chilonopsis
- Species: †C. melanoides

Binomial name
- †Chilonopsis melanoides Wollaston, 1878

Species of gastropod

Chilonopsis melanoides was a species of air-breathing land snails, terrestrial pulmonate gastropod mollusks in the family Achatinidae. This species was endemic to Saint Helena. It was last recorded in 1878 and is now extinct.
