= Chilonopsis subplicatus =

Conservation status
- Extinct (IUCN 2.3)

Scientific classification
- Kingdom: Animalia
- Phylum: Mollusca
- Class: Gastropoda
- Order: Stylommatophora
- Family: Achatinidae
- Genus: †Chilonopsis
- Species: †C. subplicatus

Binomial name
- †Chilonopsis subplicatus Sowerby I, 1844

Species of gastropod

Chilonopsis subplicatus was a species of air-breathing land snails, terrestrial pulmonate gastropod molluscs in the family Achatinidae. This species was endemic to Saint Helena. It is now extinct.
