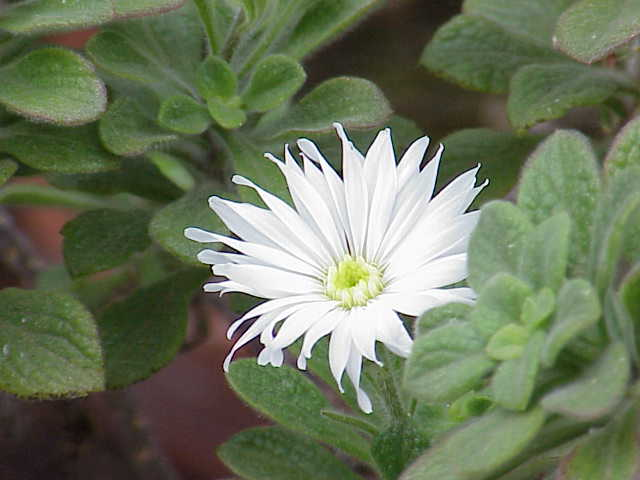
- Commidendrum rugosum

Scientific classification
- Kingdom: Plantae
- Clade: Embryophytes
- Clade: Tracheophytes
- Clade: Spermatophytes
- Clade: Angiosperms
- Clade: Eudicots
- Clade: Asterids
- Order: Asterales
- Family: Asteraceae
- Subfamily: Asteroideae
- Tribe: Astereae
- Subtribe: Homochrominae
- Genus: Commidendrum; Burch. ex DC.

Synonyms
- Dectis Raf.; Commidendron Lem., spelling variant

= Commidendrum =

Genus of flowering plants

Commidendrum is a genus of trees and shrubs in the family Asteraceae endemic to the island of Saint Helena in the South Atlantic Ocean. The vernacular name is gumwood or scrubwood.

Species

- †Commidendrum burchellii (Hook.f.) Benth. & Hook.f. ex Hemsl.
- Commidendrum robustum (Roxb.) DC. (Saint Helena gumwood)
- Commidendrum rotundifolium (Roxb.) DC. (bastard gumwood)
- Commidendrum rugosum (Aiton) DC. (scrubwood)
- Commidendrum spurium (G. Forst.) DC. (false gumwood)
