= Pupilla obliquicosta =

Conservation status
- Extinct (IUCN 2.3)

Scientific classification
- Kingdom: Animalia
- Phylum: Mollusca
- Class: Gastropoda
- Order: Stylommatophora
- Family: Pupillidae
- Genus: Pupilla
- Species: †P. obliquicosta

Binomial name
- †Pupilla obliquicosta Smith, 1892

Extinct species of gastropod

†Pupilla obliquicosta is an extinct species of minute, air-breathing land snail, a terrestrial pulmonate gastropod mollusk or micromollusk in the family Pupillidae. This species was endemic to Saint Helena but is now extinct due to human activities.
