= Helenoconcha minutissima =

Conservation status
- Extinct (IUCN 2.3)

Scientific classification
- Kingdom: Animalia
- Phylum: Mollusca
- Class: Gastropoda
- Order: Stylommatophora
- Family: Charopidae
- Genus: Helenoconcha
- Species: †H. minutissima

Binomial name
- †Helenoconcha minutissima Smith, 1892

Extinct species of gastropod

Helenoconcha minutissima is an extinct species of gastropod in the family Charopidae. It was endemic to Saint Helena.
