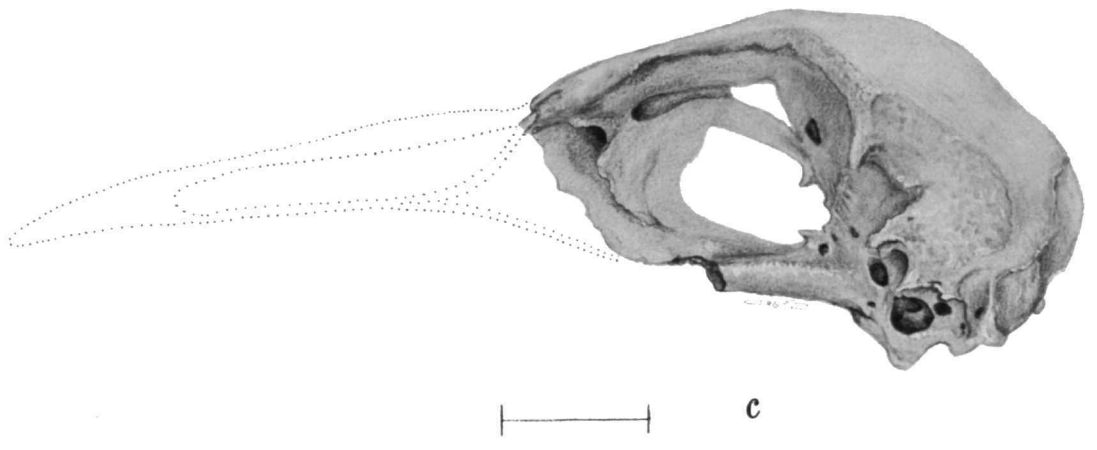
- Drawing of the skull, with the missing beak speculatively restored with dashed lines.

Conservation status
- Extinct (Early 16th century) (IUCN 3.1)

Scientific classification
- Kingdom: Animalia
- Phylum: Chordata
- Class: Aves
- Order: Gruiformes
- Family: Rallidae
- Genus: †Aphanocrex; Wetmore, 1963
- Species: †A. podarces

Binomial name
- †Aphanocrex podarces Wetmore, 1963
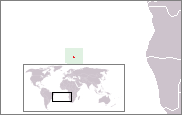
- Location of Saint Helena

Synonyms
- Atlantisia podarces

= Saint Helena rail =

Extinct species of bird

The Saint Helena rail (Aphanocrex podarces) is an extinct species of flightless rail from Saint Helena. It disappeared from the island in the early 16th century.

When American ornithologist Alexander Wetmore described this species from subfossil remains which were found at Prosperous Bay, Saint Helena, he classified it into the new genus Aphanocrex. However, in 1973 American paleontologist Storrs Olson synonymised this genus with the genus Atlantisia, the other representative of which was the Inaccessible Island rail (Atlantisia rogersi). While Olson had considered it as congener of the Inaccessible Island rail, other scientists regarded it not even as a close relative and so it is retained in Aphanocrex.

The Saint Helena rail was relatively large and reached almost the size of the New Zealand weka (Gallirallus australis). In contrast to the weka it was more slender. Since Saint Helena was predator free until the sixteenth century, the rail had lost its ability to fly but its wings were better developed like the wings of the rails from Inaccessible Island and Ascension Island. Furthermore, it had strong toes with long claws, which gave that species a good ability to climb and flutter up the steep valley walls. It fed probably on the eggs and the juveniles of several Saint Helena terrestrial and pelagic bird species and on snails. Like other ground-nesting birds such as the Saint Helena crake and the Saint Helena hoopoe it became a victim of alien predators like cats and rats which were brought to Saint Helena after 1502.

Storrs Olson suggested that Aphanocrex may have fed on food dropped by visiting seabirds.
