= Helenodiscus bilamellata =

Conservation status
- Extinct (IUCN 2.3)

Scientific classification
- Kingdom: Animalia
- Phylum: Mollusca
- Class: Gastropoda
- Order: Stylommatophora
- Family: Charopidae
- Genus: Helenodiscus
- Species: †H. bilamellata

Binomial name
- †Helenodiscus bilamellata (G. B. Sowerby I, 1844)

Species of gastropod

Helenodiscus bilamellata was a species of small air-breathing land snail, terrestrial pulmonate gastropod mollusks in the family Charopidae.

This species was endemic to Saint Helena. It is now extinct.
