= Saint Helena petrel =

Conservation status
- Extinct (IUCN 3.1)

Scientific classification
- Kingdom: Animalia
- Phylum: Chordata
- Class: Aves
- Order: Procellariiformes
- Family: Procellariidae
- Genus: Pterodroma
- Species: †P. rupinarum

Binomial name
- †Pterodroma rupinarum Olson, 1975

Extinct species of bird

The Saint Helena petrel (Pterodroma rupinarum), also known as the Saint Helena gadfly petrel or large Saint Helena petrel, is an extinct species of seabird in the family Procellariidae. It was endemic to the island of Saint Helena in the South Atlantic Ocean. It most likely became extinct after overpredation by people, soon after the island's discovery in 1502. DNA results place it within the group of Atlantic Pterodroma species.
