= Saint Helena shearwater =

Saint Helena shearwater Temporal range: Late Pleistocene - Early Holocene

Scientific classification
- Kingdom: Animalia
- Phylum: Chordata
- Class: Aves
- Order: Procellariiformes
- Family: Procellariidae
- Genus: Ardenna
- Species: A. pacificoides

Binomial name
- Ardenna pacificoides Olson, 1975

Extinct species of bird

The Saint Helena shearwater (Ardenna pacificoides) is an extinct species of seabird in the petrel family. It is known only from subfossil remains found on the island of Saint Helena in the South Atlantic Ocean. It probably became extinct at the end of the last glacial period, or the early Holocene, as the climate became warmer.

== Etymology ==
The specific name of the taxon comes from pacificus plus Greek oides (like or resembling), from its relationship to the living species Puffinus pacificus (now known as Ardenna pacifica). It was later recognized as a species of Ardenna since 2018.
