= Saint Helena cuckoo =

Conservation status
- Extinct (IUCN 3.1)

Scientific classification
- Kingdom: Animalia
- Phylum: Chordata
- Class: Aves
- Order: Cuculiformes
- Family: Cuculidae
- Genus: †Nannococcyx; Olson, 1975
- Species: †N. psix

Binomial name
- †Nannococcyx psix Olson, 1975
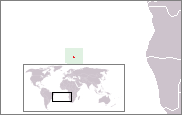
- Location of Saint Helena

Extinct species of bird

The Saint Helena cuckoo (Nannococcyx psix) is an extinct bird. It was confirmed to have previously existed by a single humerus. Compared to other cuckoos, it was relatively small and it probably lived in forests on the island of Saint Helena. Its extinction was a result of deforestation on the island in the 18th century.
