= Saint Helena crake =

Conservation status
- Extinct (Early 16th century) (IUCN 3.1)

Scientific classification
- Kingdom: Animalia
- Phylum: Chordata
- Class: Aves
- Order: Gruiformes
- Family: Rallidae
- Genus: Zapornia
- Species: †Z. astrictocarpus

Binomial name
- †Zapornia astrictocarpus (Olson, 1973)
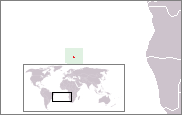
- Location of Saint Helena.

Synonyms
- Porzana astrictocarpus

Extinct species of bird

The Saint Helena crake (Zapornia astrictocarpus) is an extinct bird species from the island of Saint Helena in the South Atlantic Ocean, one of two flightless rails which survived there until the early 16th century.

After American ornithologist Alexander Wetmore described bones of the large Saint Helena rail (Aphanocrex podarces) from Prosperous Bay, Saint Helena, in 1963, American paleontologist Storrs Olson found almost complete skeletons of the Saint Helena crake in the same region in 1973. These skeletons consist of bones which were smaller than the bones of Aphanocrex podarces. Due to the peculiar shape of the carpometacarpus Olson named this species Porzana astrictocarpus.

Olson proceeded on the assumption that the Saint Helena crake was a derivative of the Baillon's crake (Zapornia pusilla), which is widespread in Europe and Africa. As there were no predators on Saint Helena, it had lost its ability to fly. However, when Saint Helena was colonised around 1502, the settlers brought a lot of mammals to the island, leading to the out-competition and eventual extinction of the Saint Helena crake.
