= Moorean viviparous tree snail =

Moorean viviparous tree snail can refer to any member of the family Partulidae that is found in Moorea. Those are:

- Partula aurantia
- Partula exigua
- Partula mirabilis
- Partula mooreana
- Partula suturalis
- Partula taeniata
- Partula tohiveana
- Samoana diaphana
- and to a lesser extent Samoana attenuata which is found on Moorea but also on other islands
