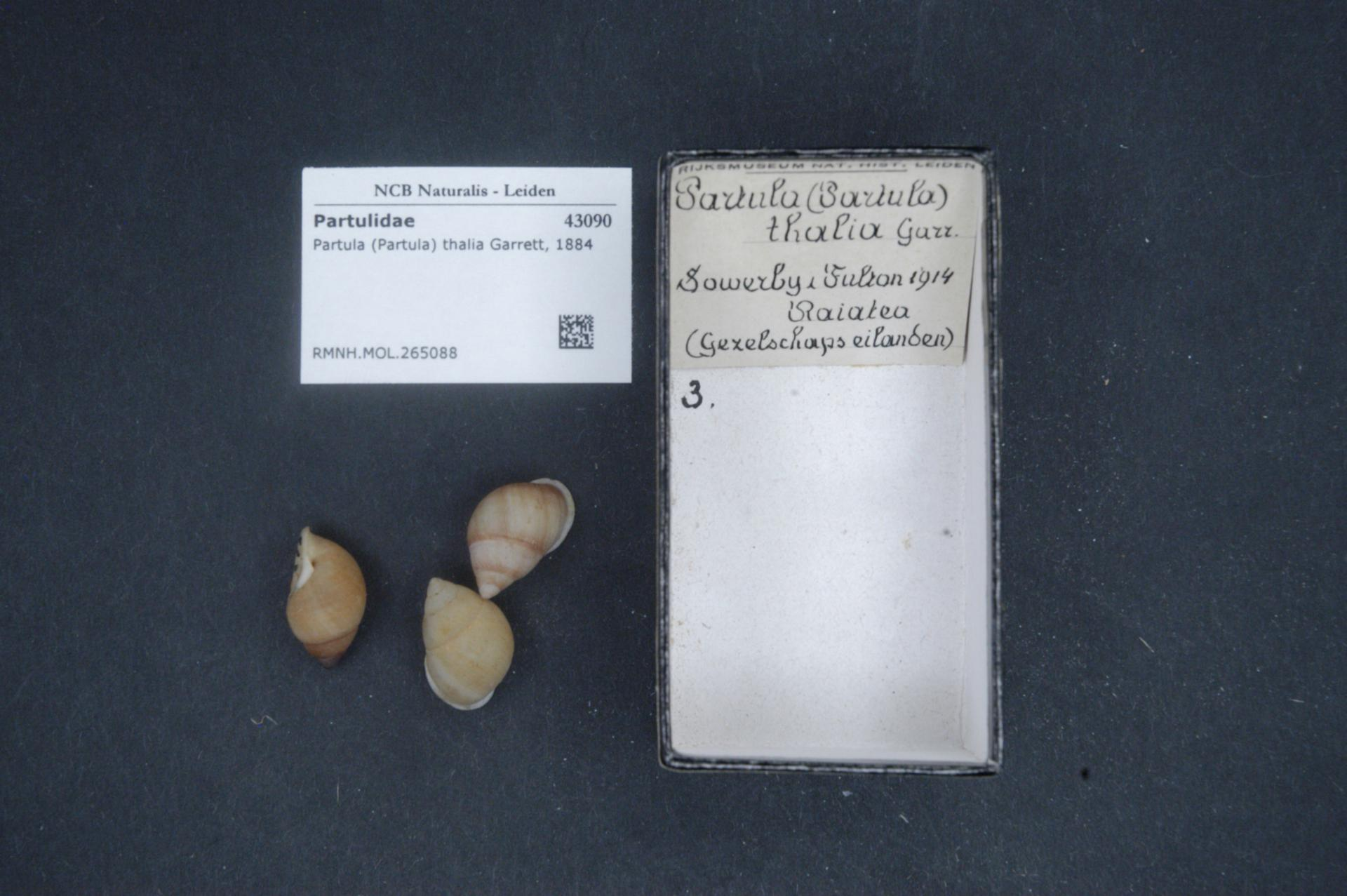

Conservation status
- Extinct (IUCN 3.1)

Scientific classification
- Kingdom: Animalia
- Phylum: Mollusca
- Class: Gastropoda
- Order: Stylommatophora
- Family: Partulidae
- Genus: Partula
- Species: P. garrettii
- Subspecies: P. g. thalia

Trinomial name
- Partula garrettii thalia Garrett, 1884

= Partula garrettii thalia =

Extinct subspecies of gastropod

Partula garrettii thalia was a subspecies of air-breathing tropical land snail, a terrestrial pulmonate gastropod mollusk in the family Partulidae. This subspecies was endemic to Ra'iātea, French Polynesia. It is now extinct.
