= Bean snail =

Bean snail is a common name of snail species including

- Melampus coffea, the coffee bean snail
- Partula faba, Captain Cook's bean snail

== See also ==
- Snail bean, a species of vine
