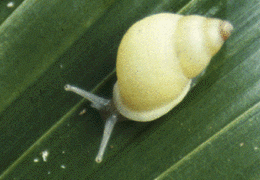

Conservation status
- Extinct (IUCN 3.1)

Scientific classification
- Kingdom: Animalia
- Phylum: Mollusca
- Class: Gastropoda
- Order: Stylommatophora
- Family: Partulidae
- Genus: Partula
- Species: †P. langfordi

Binomial name
- †Partula langfordi Kondo, 1970

= Partula langfordi =

Langford's tree snail

Species of gastropod

Partula langfordi was a species of air-breathing land snail, a terrestrial pulmonate gastropod mollusk in the family Partulidae. This species was known by the common name Langford's tree snail and endemic to the Northern Mariana Islands. It was recently declared extinct by the International Union for Conservation of Nature in June of 2024.

The species first collected by Yoshio Kondo, Albert B. Bronson, and Ramon San Nicolas in 1952, and named by Kondo in honor of the late Daniel B. Langford, who had compiled a massive collection of Pacific marine shells between 1893 and 1952.

== See also ==
List of land snails of the Mariana Islands
