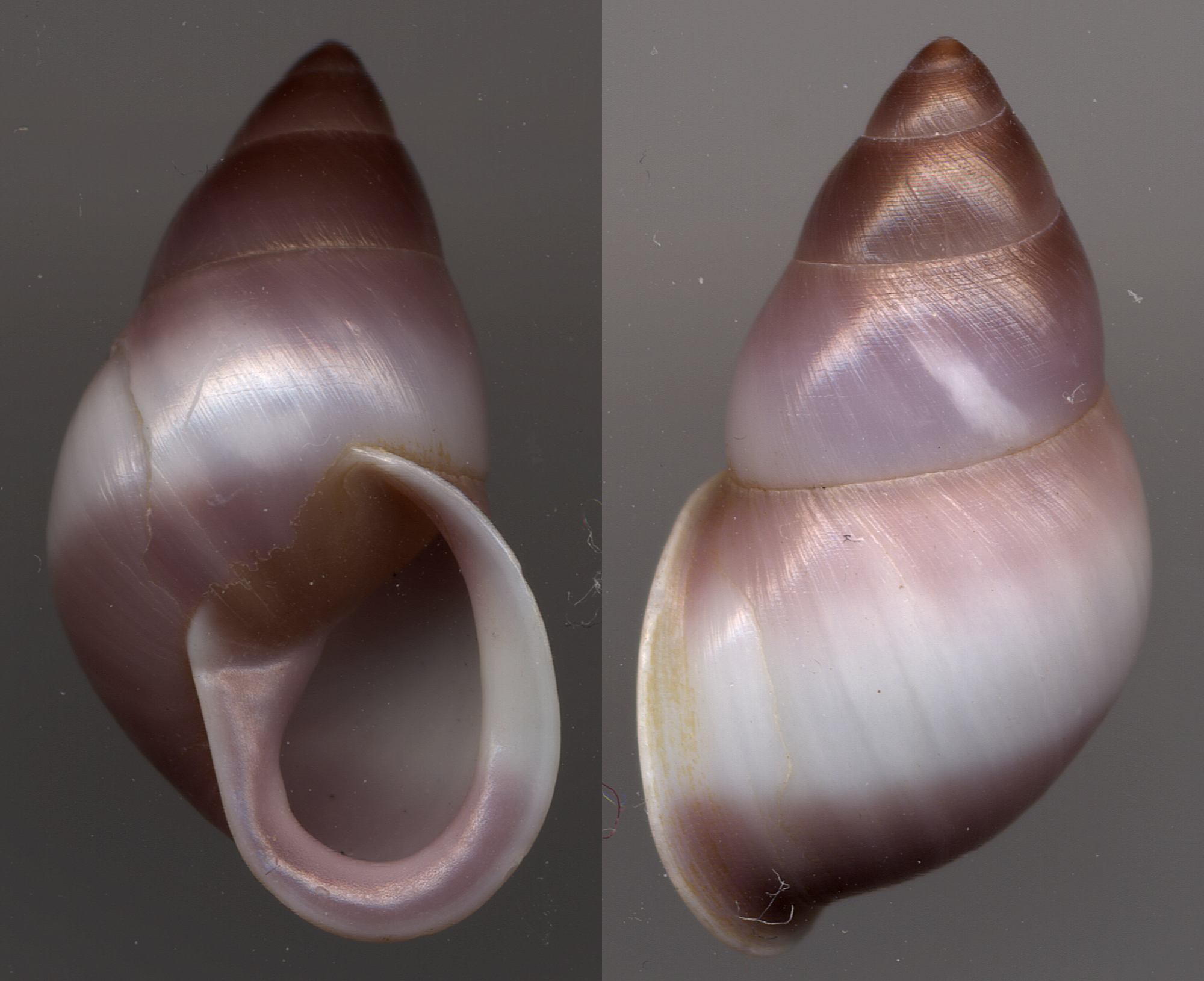

Conservation status
- Extinct in the Wild (IUCN 3.1)

Scientific classification
- Kingdom: Animalia
- Phylum: Mollusca
- Class: Gastropoda
- Order: Stylommatophora
- Family: Partulidae
- Genus: Partula
- Species: P. rosea

Binomial name
- Partula rosea Broderip, 1832

Synonyms
- Partula purpurascens L. Pfeiffer, 1857 (junior synonym)

= Partula rosea =

Species of gastropod

Partula rosea is a species of air-breathing tropical land snail, a terrestrial pulmonate' gastropod mollusk in the family Partulidae.

== Description ==
The length of the shell attains 22.4 mm (0.88 in).

== Uses ==
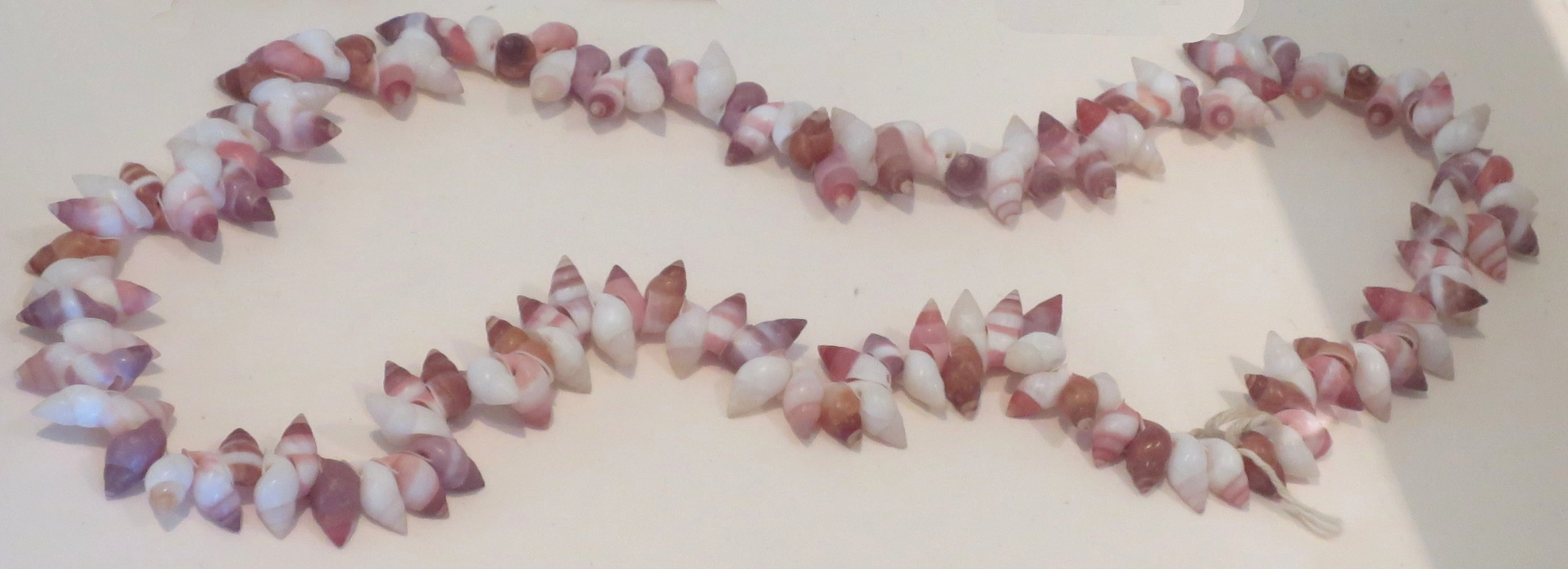
A lei made of Partula rosea shells

The shell of this species was used to make lei, like Partula varia from the same island.

== Distribution ==
This species was endemic to Huahine, French Polynesia. It was extinct in the wild, only existing in captivity.

Half the world's population of this snail was within one room at Marwell Zoo in the UK. In 2019 the species was reintroduced to the wild on Huahine.
