= Partula dolorosa =

Conservation status
- Extinct (IUCN 3.1)

Scientific classification
- Kingdom: Animalia
- Phylum: Mollusca
- Class: Gastropoda
- Order: Stylommatophora
- Family: Partulidae
- Genus: Partula
- Species: †P. dolorosa

Binomial name
- †Partula dolorosa Crampton & Cooke, 1953

Extinct species of gastropod

Partula dolorosa was a species of air-breathing tropical land snail, a terrestrial pulmonate gastropod mollusk in the family Partulidae. This species was endemic to a highland on Raiatea, French Polynesia. It is now extinct.

== Extinction ==
After the introduction of the carnivorous snail Euglandina rosea, partulid species began disappearing quickly which native in Raiatea. A few snails were found in 1992 and they had survived in captivity, like Partula labrusca which from same habitat. Unfortunately these snails are not successful in captivity and the species is now extinct.
