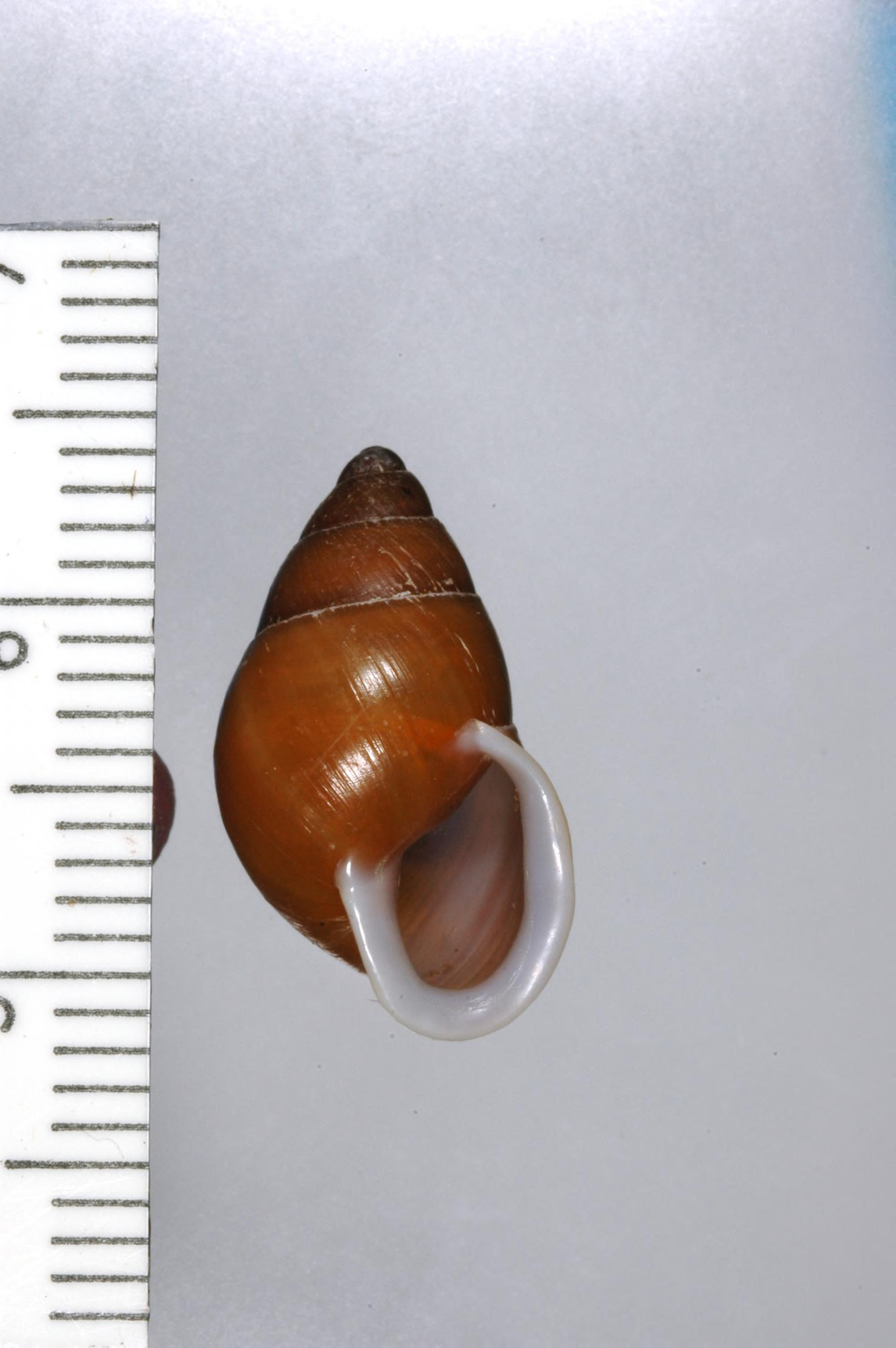

Conservation status
- Critically Endangered (IUCN 3.1)

Scientific classification
- Kingdom: Animalia
- Phylum: Mollusca
- Class: Gastropoda
- Order: Stylommatophora
- Family: Partulidae
- Genus: Partula
- Species: P. affinis

Binomial name
- Partula affinis Pease, 1868

Synonyms
- Partula otaheitana subsp. affinis Pease, 1868; Partula otaheitana subsp. dubia Garrett, 1884; Partula otaheitana var. dubia Garrett, 1884; Partula otaheitana var. erythraea H.E.Crampton, 1916

= Partula affinis =

Similar partula

Species of gastropod

Partula affinis is a species of partulid within the genus Partula. The species is rarely referred to as the similar partula, and is endemic to Tahiti.

== Distribution ==
This species' historical distribution represents almost all of Tahiti, but now its modern distribution includes only one population in Tahiti Iti, making it now considered a single valley endemic.

=== Captive breeding ===
Partula affinis is in the international Partula breeding program and the conservation efforts for this species have been very successful, allowing reintroductions since 2015.

== Phylogeny ==
Phylogenetic analyses confirmed that P. affinis is the sister species of P. otaheitana.

== Taxonomy ==
P. affinis was originally described as a subspecies of P. otaheitana (P. otaheitana affinis) but is now recognized as a distinct species.
