= Partula pearcekellyi =

Conservation status
- Extinct (IUCN 3.1)

Scientific classification
- Kingdom: Animalia
- Phylum: Mollusca
- Class: Gastropoda
- Order: Stylommatophora
- Family: Partulidae
- Genus: Partula
- Species: †P. pearcekellyi

Binomial name
- †Partula pearcekellyi (Gerlach, 2016)

Extinct species of arboreal gastropod

†Partula pearcekellyi, also known as Pearce-Kelly's tree snail, is an extinct species of arboreal gastropod in the family Partulidae which was endemic to Raiatea in the Society Islands of French Polynesia. It has been recently listed as extinct by the International Union for Conservation of Nature in June 2024, though it most likely went extinct between 1991 and 1992.

Like many other snails of the Society Islands, its extinction can be attributed to the introduction of the rosy wolfsnail (Euglandina rosea) which invaded its only known habitat in 1990.

== Anatomy ==
Although all material consists of juvenile specimens, they all appeared to be developing an anatomical structure similar to that of Partula hebe.

== Distribution ==
P. pearcekellyi is known from six specimens collected in the Toahiva Valley, four of which were live-collected juveniles found upon low shrubs and ferns, in leaf litter, and on the stumps of dead trees. During the same collection, 1 juvenile and 26 adult P. hebe specimens were taken alive, suggesting that pearcekellyi was a "rare canopy species".

== Etymology ==
Partula pearcekellyi was named after Paul Pearce-Kelly of the Zoological Society of London, a renowned conservationist.
