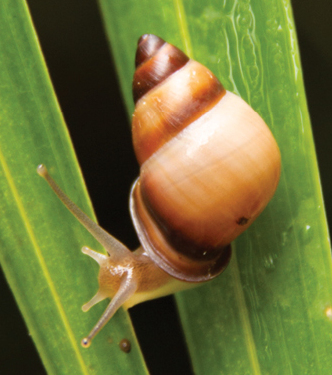

Scientific classification
- Domain: Eukaryota
- Kingdom: Animalia
- Phylum: Mollusca
- Class: Gastropoda
- Order: Stylommatophora
- Family: Partulidae
- Genus: Partula
- Species: P. lutaensis

Binomial name
- Partula lutaensis Sischo & Hadfield, 2021

= Partula lutaensis =

Species of snail

Partula lutaensis, the Rota Island tree snail or Rota Island Partula, is a species of Partula endemic to Rota in the Northern Mariana Islands. Before it was described in 2021, it was identified as P. gibba.

== Threats ==
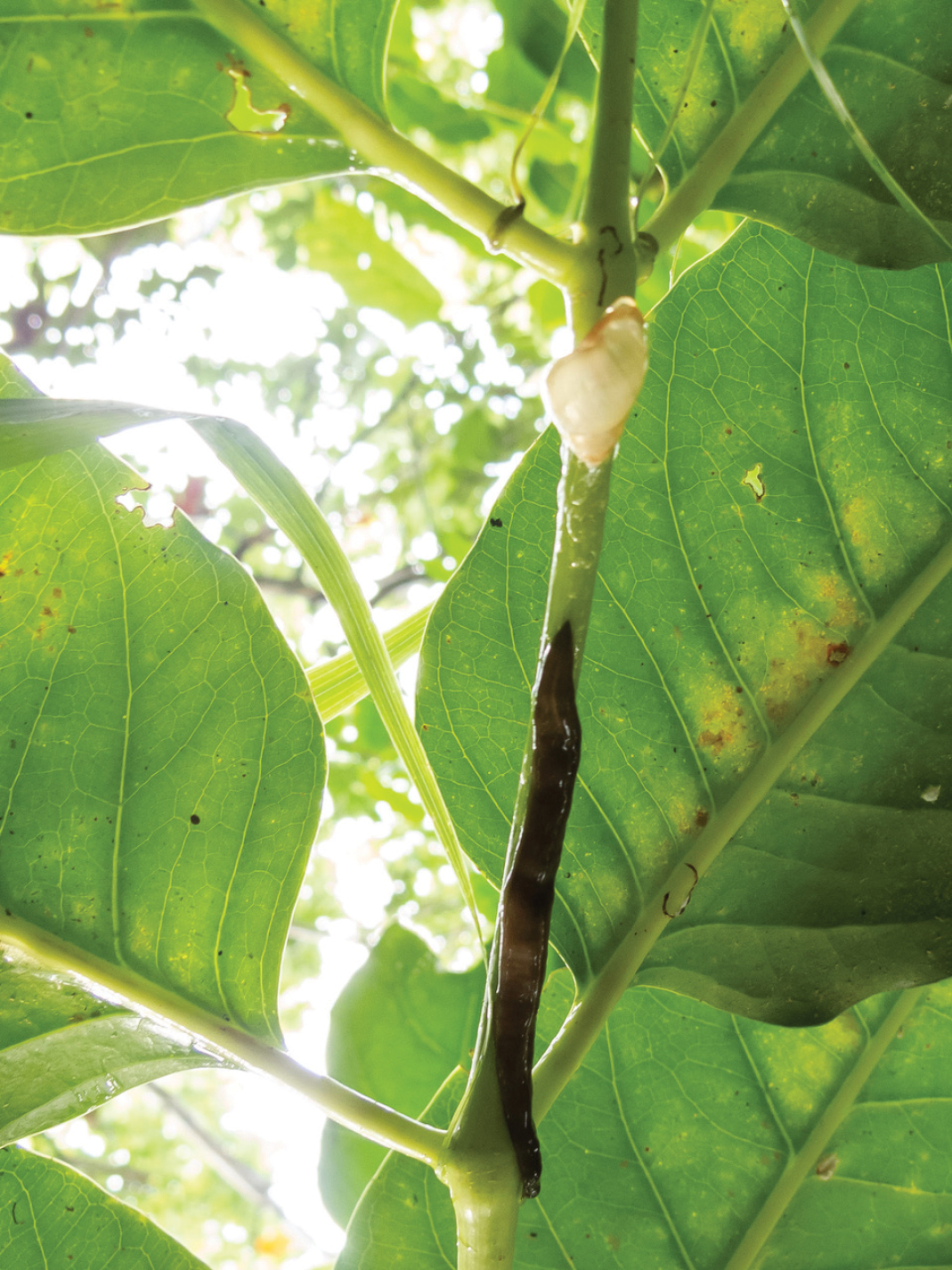
P. lutaensis depredated by Platydemus manokwari

The species is threatened by invasive predators, particularly Platydemus manokwari.
