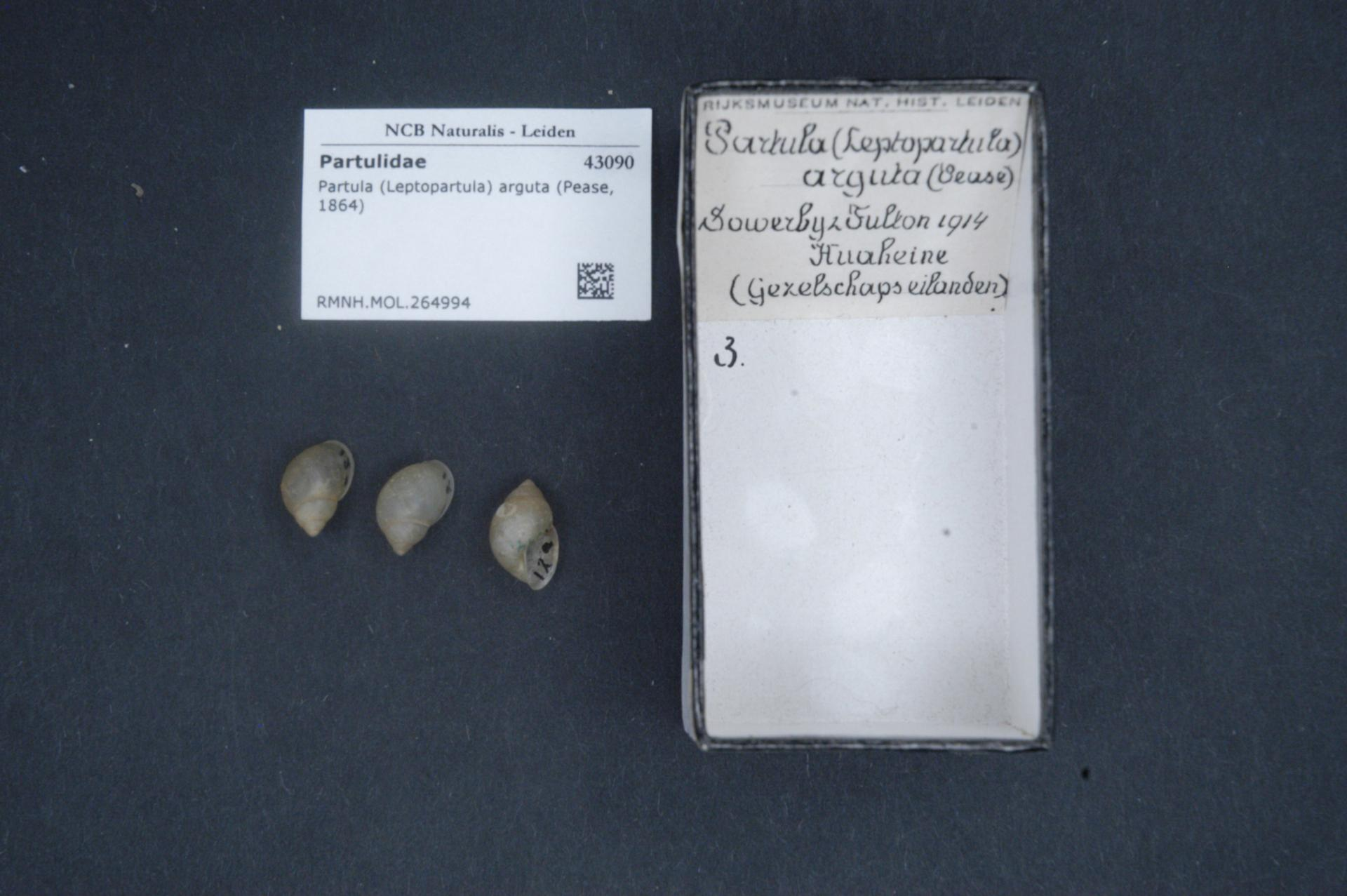

Conservation status
- Critically endangered, possibly extinct (IUCN 3.1)

Scientific classification
- Kingdom: Animalia
- Phylum: Mollusca
- Class: Gastropoda
- Order: Stylommatophora
- Family: Partulidae
- Genus: Partula
- Species: P. arguta

Binomial name
- Partula arguta (Pease, 1864)

= Partula arguta =

Species of gastropod

Partula arguta was a species of air-breathing tropical land snail, a terrestrial pulmonate gastropod mollusk in the family Partulidae. This species is endemic to French Polynesia. The last captive individual died on April 14, 1994, and the species is considered possibly extinct, with a 85-90% chance of being extinct.
