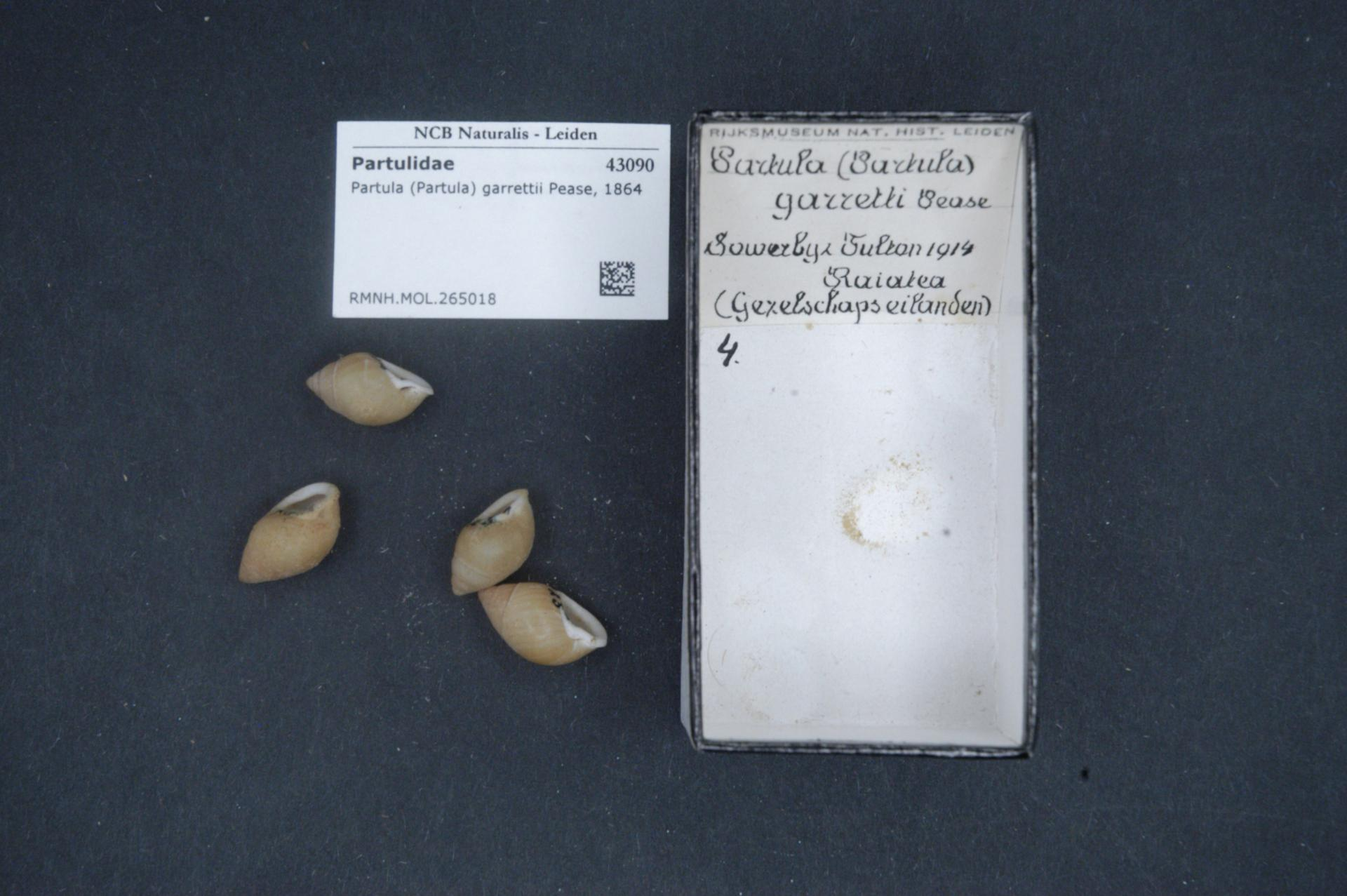

Conservation status
- Extinct in the Wild (IUCN 3.1)

Scientific classification
- Kingdom: Animalia
- Phylum: Mollusca
- Class: Gastropoda
- Order: Stylommatophora
- Family: Partulidae
- Genus: Partula
- Species: P. garrettii

Binomial name
- Partula garrettii Pease, 1864

= Partula garrettii =

Species of gastropod

Partula garrettii (Garrett's Tree Snail) is a species of air-breathing tropical land snail, a terrestrial pulmonate gastropod mollusk in the family Partulidae. This species is endemic to Ra'iātea, French Polynesia.

In 2026, it was announced that the species was successfully reintroduced to its Polynesian island by the London Zoo, the first invertebrate ever to be downlisted from extinct in the wild to critically endangered.

== Infraspecies ==
Partula garrettii garrettii - status unknown

Partula garrettii rustica - extinct

Partula garrettii thalia - extinct
