= Partula hyalina =

- Shell of Partula hyalina

Conservation status
- Vulnerable (IUCN 3.1)

Scientific classification
- Kingdom: Animalia
- Phylum: Mollusca
- Class: Gastropoda
- Order: Stylommatophora
- Family: Partulidae
- Genus: Partula
- Species: P. hyalina

Binomial name
- Partula hyalina Broderip, 1832

Species of mollusc in French Polynesia

Partula hyalina is a species of air-breathing tropical land snail, a terrestrial pulmonate gastropod mollusk in the family Partulidae. This species is endemic to French Polynesia.
