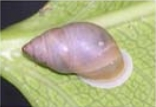
- Partula clara × incrassa

Conservation status
- Critically Endangered (IUCN 3.1)

Scientific classification
- Kingdom: Animalia
- Phylum: Mollusca
- Class: Gastropoda
- Order: Stylommatophora
- Family: Partulidae
- Genus: Partula
- Species: P. clara

Binomial name
- Partula clara Pease, 1864

= Partula clara =

Species of gastropod

Partula clara is a species of air-breathing land snail, a terrestrial pulmonate gastropod mollusk in the family Partulidae. This species is endemic to Tahiti, French Polynesia.
