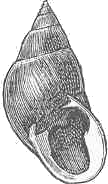
- Illustration
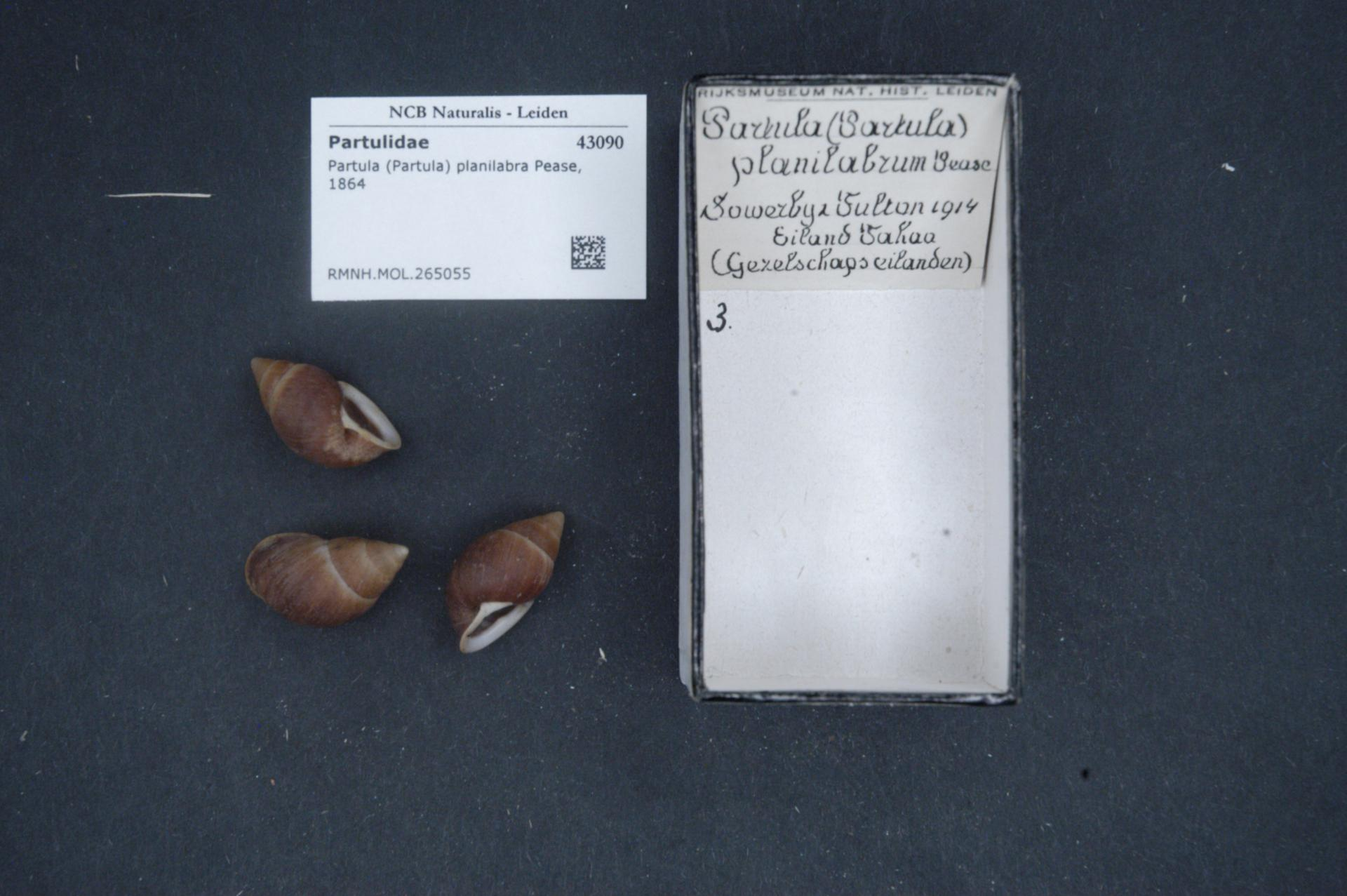

Conservation status
- Extinct (IUCN 3.1)

Scientific classification
- Kingdom: Animalia
- Phylum: Mollusca
- Class: Gastropoda
- Order: Stylommatophora
- Family: Partulidae
- Genus: Partula
- Species: †P. planilabrum

Binomial name
- †Partula planilabrum Pease, 1864

= Partula planilabrum =

Extinct species of mollusc

Partula planilabrum is an extinct species of air-breathing tropical land snail, a terrestrial pulmonate gastropod mollusk in the family Partulidae. Like other members of the genus Partula, it was a small arboreal snail adapted to life on vegetation in tropical environments. Species in this genus are best known for their restricted ranges and their importance in studies of evolution, biogeography, and conservation.

This species was endemic to Tahaa, French Polynesia. It is now extinct.
