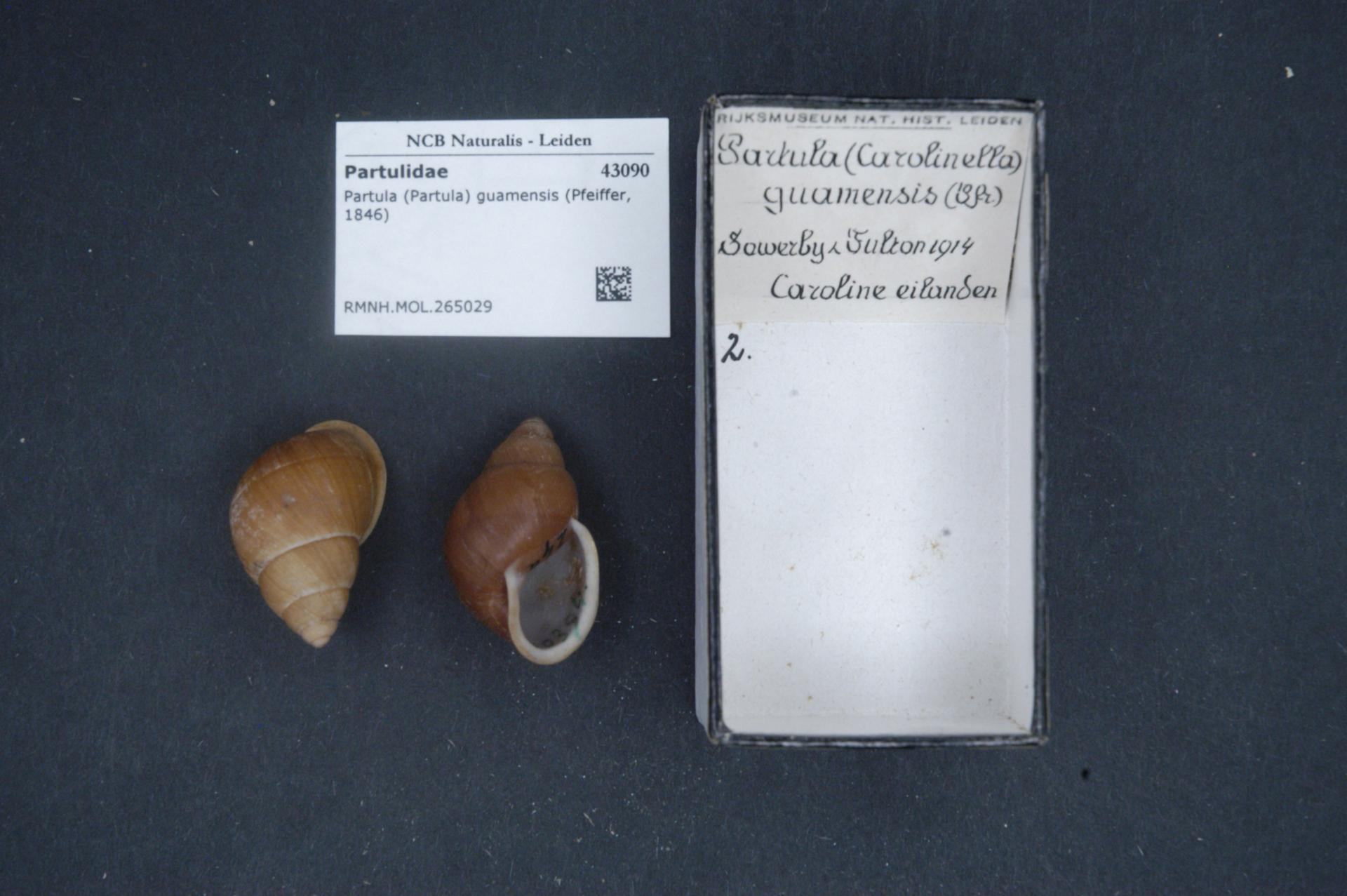

Conservation status
- Extinct (IUCN 3.1)

Scientific classification
- Kingdom: Animalia
- Phylum: Mollusca
- Class: Gastropoda
- Order: Stylommatophora
- Family: Partulidae
- Genus: Partula
- Species: †P. guamensis

Binomial name
- †Partula guamensis Pfeiffer, 1846

Synonyms
- Bulimus guamensis L. Pfeiffer, 1846 (original combination); Partula brumalis Reeve, 1850; Partula ponapensis Hartman, 1885; Partula rufa grandis Möllendorff, 1900; Partula rufa montana Möllendorff, 1900

= Partula guamensis =

Extinct species of gastropod

Partula guamensis was a species of air-breathing tropical land snail, a terrestrial pulmonate gastropod mollusk in the family Partulidae. It was endemic to the island of Pohnpei in Micronesia, where it was once widespread, however, no live individuals have been seen since 1936. The species was officially listed as extinct by the International Union for Conservation of Nature in June 2024.

== Distribution ==
This species was endemic to the island of Pohnpei (Federated States of Micronesia).
