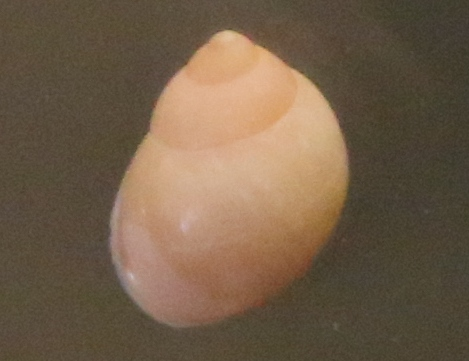
- Shell of a Partula turgida at the National Museum of Scotland

Conservation status
- Extinct (IUCN 3.1)

Scientific classification
- Kingdom: Animalia
- Phylum: Mollusca
- Class: Gastropoda
- Order: Stylommatophora
- Family: Partulidae
- Genus: Partula
- Species: †P. turgida

Binomial name
- †Partula turgida (Pease, 1865)

= Partula turgida =

Species of gastropod

Partula turgida, also known as the Raiatean thin-shelled partula, is an extinct species of air-breathing tropical land snail, a terrestrial pulmonate gastropod mollusk in the family Partulidae. This species was endemic to Ra'iātea, French Polynesia. It is now extinct.

Partula clarkei, misidentified as this species, was being kept alive in captivity, when the population suffered a crash caused by the microsporidian genus Steinhausia. This is the first definitive report of an extinction of a species caused by a parasite.

The genus Partula was presumed to have been established around 1.5 million BC.

== Description ==
As with other Partula species, P. turgida measured under two centimeters. It was stated to cover less than two feet of distance annually. P. turgida consumed algae found on tree leaves, as well as dead vegetation.

== Distribution and habitat ==
Partula turgida was endemic to Ra'iātea, French Polynesia.

== Extinction ==
Partula turgida began significantly decreasing at the beginning of the 20th century, partially due to habitat loss, but more significantly due to the introduction of African giant land snails (Lissachatina fulica). Foreigners brought the African giant land snails to the region as "foodstuffs" in 1967, though some sources claim they were also used as "garden ornaments". Shortly after their introduction, the African giant land snails began decimating the native Partula turgida population. In the 1970s, conservationists imported the rosy wolf snail (Euglandina rosea) to reduce the African giant land snail's population. However, the rosy wolf snail preferred Partula species over the African giant land snails, causing the extinction of 27 tree snail species within a decade of its introduction.

As an additional conservation effort, a captive breeding program was initiated at the London Zoo in the early 1990s, including 296 P. turgida. Within a few years however, many of the captured specimens had died, with the P. turgida population dropping under 10. Post-mortem analyses of the snails indicated they had been infected by fungi likely belonging to the microsporidian genus Steinhausia. Because species of this genus typically infect aquatic snails, researchers believed the snail deaths may have been caused by a new species.

The last known Partula turgida, Turgi, died 31 January 1996 at the London Zoo. After Turgi's death, the zoo erected a tombstone stating, "1.5 million years BC to January 1996" to mark the species' extinction. Turgi was named in the 2022 children's book The Late, Great Endlings: Stories of the Last Survivors, written by Deborah Kerbel and illustrated by Aimee van Drimmelen.

Partula turgida's population decrease and eventual extinction was closely watched and documented. It also marked the first known instance of a parasite causing a species' extinction.
