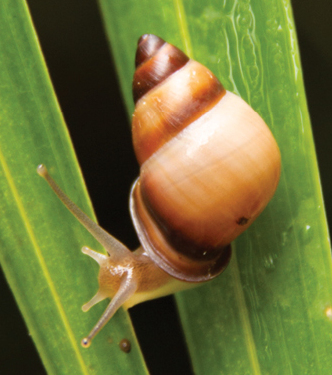
- Partula lutaensis

Scientific classification
- Kingdom: Animalia
- Phylum: Mollusca
- Class: Gastropoda
- Order: Stylommatophora
- Infraorder: Pupilloidei
- Superfamily: Pupilloidea
- Family: Partulidae
- Genus: Partula; Férussac, 1821

Synonyms
- list of synonyms: Astraea Hartman, 1881; Bulimus (Partula); Clytia Hartman, 1881; Echo Hartman, 1881; Harmonia Hartman, 1881; Helena Hartman, 1881; Marianna Pilsbry, 1909; Matata Hartman, 1881; Nenia Hartman, 1881; Oenone Hartman, 1881; Partula (Astraea) Hartman, 1881 (invalid: junior homonym of Astraea Röding, 1798 [Gastropoda, Turbinidae]); Partula (Carolinella) Pilsbry, 1909; Partula (Clytia) Hartman, 1881 (invalid: junior homonym of Clytia Lamouroux, 1812 [Cnidaria]); Partula (Echo) Hartman, 1881 (invalid: junior homonym of Echo Selys, 1853 [Odonata]; Leptopartula is a replacement name); Partula (Harmonia) Hartman, 1881 (invalid: junior homonym of Harmonia Mulsant, 1846 [Coleoptera]; Marianna is a replacement name); Partula (Helena) Hartman, 1881 (invalid: junior homonym of Helena Risso, 1826 [Crustacea]); Partula (Leptopartula) Pilsbry, 1909; Partula (Marianella) Pilsbry, 1909; Partula (Marianna) Pilsbry, 1909; Partula (Matata) Hartman, 1881; Partula (Melanesica) Pilsbry, 1909; Partula (Nenia) Hartman, 1881 (invalid: junior homonym of Nenia H. & A. Adams, 1855 [Gastropoda, Clausiliidae]); Partula (Oenone) Hartman, 1881 (invalid: junior homonym of Oenone Lamarck, 1818 [Annelida]); Partula (Partula) A. Férussac, 1821· accepted, alternate representation; Partula (Pasithea) Hartman, 1881 (invalid: junior homonym of Pasithea Oken, 1807 [Vermes], Pasithea Lamarck, 1812 [Cnidaria] and Pasithea Lea, 1833 [Gastropoda]); Partula (Rennellia) Clench, 1941 (junior synonym); Partula (Sterope) Hartman, 1881 (invalid: junior homonym of Sterope Goodsir, 1845 [Crustacea]); Partula (Thakombaua) Pilsbry, 1909; Pasithea Hartman, 1881 (junior synonym); Rennellia Clench, 1941 (junior synonym); Scilistylus Iredale, 1941; Sterope Hartman, 1881

= Partula (gastropod) =

Genus of gastropods

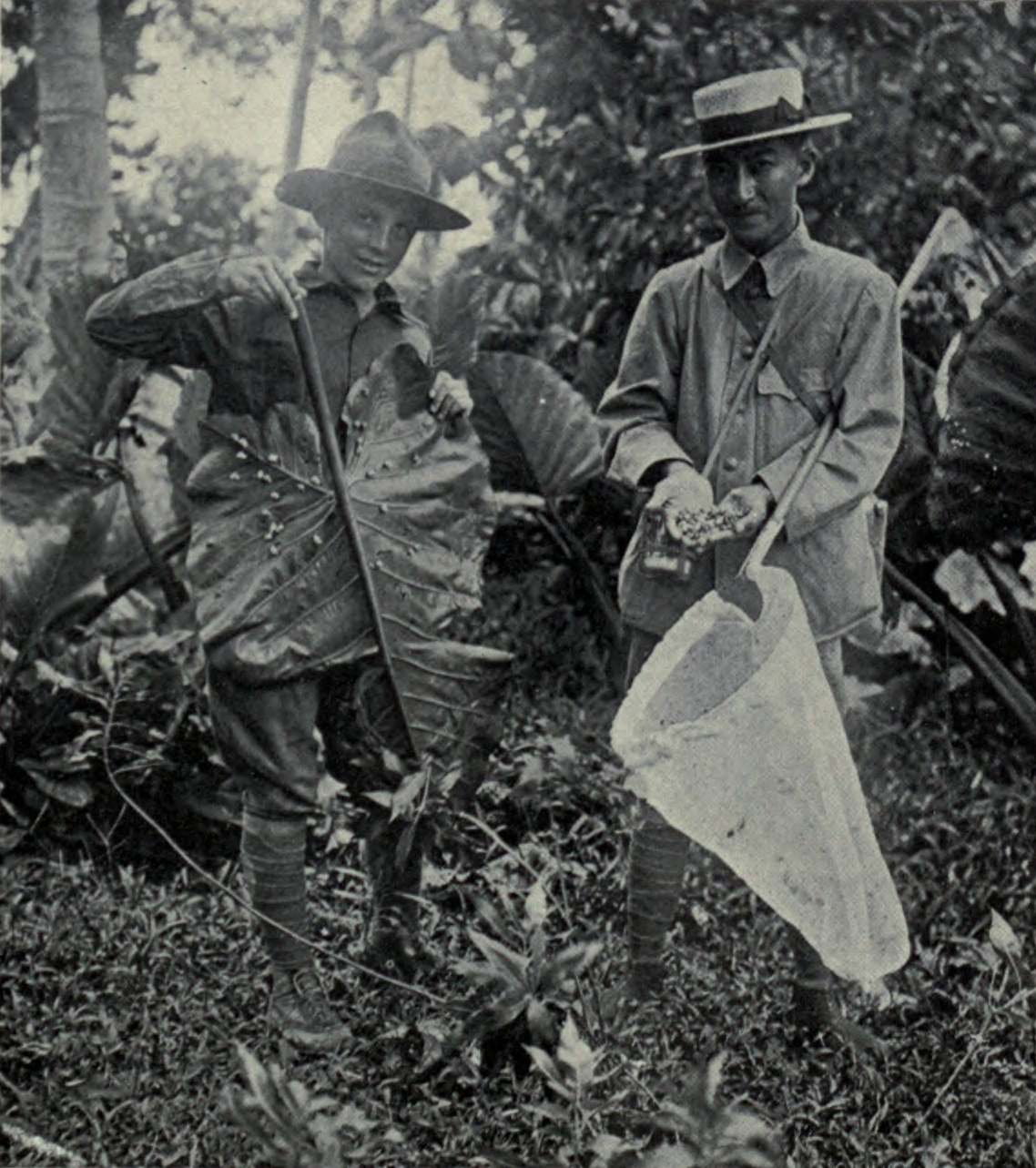
Black-and-white photo taken in July 1920 in Saipan, showing numerous Partula snails on the underside of a single leaf of Caladium

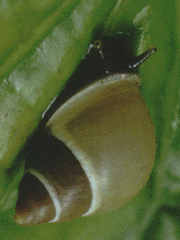
Partula gibba

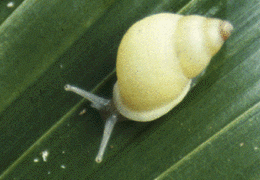
Partula langfordi

Partula is a genus of air-breathing tropical land snails, terrestrial pulmonate gastropod mollusks in the family Partulidae.

Many species of Partula are known under the general common names "Polynesian tree snail" and "Moorean viviparous tree snail". Partulids are distributed across 5,000 sq mi (13,000 km^{2}) of Pacific Ocean islands, from the Society Islands to New Guinea.

Once used as decorative items in Polynesian ceremonial wear and jewelry, these small snails, averaging about 0.5–0.75 inches (13–19 mm) in length, gained the attention of science when Dr. Henry Crampton (along with Yoshio Kondo) spent 50 years studying and cataloging partulids, detailing their remarkable array of morphological elements, ecological niches, and behavioral aspects that illustrate adaptive radiation.

== Decline ==
The partulids of the island of Tahiti act as an example of the possible deleterious effects of attempted biological control. After an infestation of the introduced giant African land snails (Achatina spp.), the carnivorous Florida rosy wolfsnail (Euglandina rosea) was introduced into Tahiti in an attempt to combat the African species.

Instead, the rosy wolfsnail hunted the nearly 76 species of Partula that were endemic to Tahiti and the nearby islands, causing all but 12 species to go extinct within a decade. Scientists were able to save 12 of these species prior to their becoming extinct.

Today, the Zoological Society of London runs the Partula Programme Consortium which maintains a captive-breeding programme in the United Kingdom, France, and the United States.

As of the 2024 update released on June 27, the IUCN Red List of Threatened Species contains 73 Partula species. Of these, 32 are listed as extinct, 10 are extinct in the wild, 17 are critically endangered, 8 are endangered, 2 are vulnerable, and only 4 species are least concern.

Individuals are being reintroduced to Tahiti from captive breeding programmes since 2014. In April 2023, over 5,000 individual snails from zoos in the United States and the United Kingdom were released on Tahiti and Mo'orea.

== Species ==
Species within the genus Partula include:

=== Full list ===
- The species pages are currently outdated because of the IUCN 2024-1 update.
- The list may be currently missing some species. If you notice a missing species please add it.

Species	S	P	C	Notes
Partula affinis	CR	1	Yes	A single population persists on Tahiti Iti but reasonable numbers exist in captivity.
Partula arguta	PE	0	Formerly	The last captive individual died in 1994.
Partula assimilis	CR	1	No	Threatened by habitat loss, though currently relatively free of predators.
Partula atilis	EX	0	No	
Partula auraniana	EN	5	Formerly	Extirpated from its type locality in Aore Island but persists in the Torres Islands.
Partula aurantia	EX	0	Formerly	The last captive individual died in the 1980s.
Partula auriculata	EX	0	No	Could not be located after 1991. Old shells were found in 1994.
Partula bilineata	EX	0	No	Could not be located after 1993.
Partula clara	CR	20	Formerly	Has become much rarer but several populations persist.
Partula clarkei	EX	0	Formerly	Last captive individual died in 1996.
Partula compressa	PE	1	Formerly	One population photographed in 2004.
Partula cootei	EX	0	No	Outcompeted by Partula hyalina. Old shells found in 2005.
Partula cramptoni	CR	1	No	Extirpated from Rennell Island, though survives in Bellona Island.
Partula crassilabris	EX	0	No	
Partula cuneata	EX	0	No	Could not be located in the 1992 survey.
Partula cytherea	PE	1	No	Isolated population on Mt. Marau confirmed in 2005.
Partula dentifera	EX	0	Misidentified	Only dead shells could be found in the 1991 survey.
Partula desolata	N/A	0	No	Fossil species.
Partula diminuta	EX	0	No	Could not be located after 1980.
Partula dolichostoma	EX	0	No	Could not be located after 1980.
Partula dolorosa	EX	0	No	Could not be located after 1992.
Partula emersoni	CR	2	No	Currently only known from a dead subadult in one location and a live one in another.
Partula eremita	EX	0	No	Could not be located after 1980.
Partula faba	EX	0	Formerly	The last captive individual died in 2016.
Partula flexuosa	LC	?	No	Tolerant of current levels of disturbance and predators.
Partula garrettii	EW	0	Yes	
Partula gibba	EN	4	Formerly	Persists in Guam, Sarigan, Pagan and Saipan. Extinct on Aguijan.
Partula grisea	LC	?	No	All populations appear to be tolerant of threats.
Partula guamensis	EX	0	No	2005, 2006 and 2008 surveys found only 4 old, eroded shells.
Partula hebe	EW	0	Yes	
Partula hyalina	VU	1-5	Yes	Wild populations may be recovering.
Partula incrassa	CR	1	No	All individuals are hybrids with Partula clara.
Partula jackieburchi	PE	1	No	May survive on Mt. Aorai.
Partula labrusca	EX	0	Formerly	The last captive individual died in 2002.
Partula laevigata	PE	1	Formerly	One population may survive in central Tahiti.
Partula lanceolata	EN	3	No	Endemic to Mago, Cicia and Naiau.
Partula langfordi	EX	0	Misidentified	Not located in 1992.
Partula leefei	CR	1	No	Survival confirmed from a single individual.
Partula leptochila	EX	0	No	Could not be located after 1980.
Partula levistriata	EX	0	No	Could not be located after 1980.
Partula lirata	EN	11	Formerly	Many populations are unstable and inviable in the long-term.
Partula lugubris	EX	0	No	Could not be located in the 1990s.
Partula lutaensis	N/A	?	Formerly	Endemic to Rota. Little is known about this species.
Partula lutea	EX	0	No	Only species found in Bora Bora. Could not be located in 2006 or 2017.
Partula magistri	EX	0	No	Only known from a single specimen.
Partula makatea	N/A	0	No	Fossil species.
Partula meyeri	PE	1	No	Only known from a single location. Not seen since its discovery in 2005.
Partula micans	LC	?	No	No major threats to this species are known.
Partula mirabilis	EW	0	Yes	
Partula mooreana	EW	0	Yes	
Partula navigatoria	EW	0	Yes	
Partula nodosa	EW	0	Yes	
Partula obesa	CR	2	No	Endemic to Alofi and Futuna. Population declined severely in both islands.
Partula otaheitana	EN	5-10	Misidentified	Survives in populations above 950m altitude and in one population on Tahiti Iti.
Partula pacifica	VU	6-10	No	Endemic to nine islands. Eliminated from Espiritu Santo and Aore, the island of "Yatalo" remains unidentified and the other six islands have not been surveyed.
Partula pearcekellyi	EX	0	No	Single valley endemic. A single shell was found in 1992.
Partula planilabrum	EX	0	No	Could not be located in 1994.
Partula producta	EX	0	No	Could not be located after 1980.
Partula protracta	EX	0	No	Could not be located after 1980.
Partula pyramis	EN	4-5	No	Type population is almost certainly extinct. Remaining populations have not been surveyed.
Partula radiolata	EN	1	No	Only one population remains. Viable but vulnerable.
Partula radiosa	EN	1-2	No	Little is known about this species. May already be extinct.
Partula remota	EX	0	No	Could not be located after 1980.
Partula rosea	EW	0	Yes	
Partula rufa	PE	1	No	Not located after 1936.
Partula sagitta	EX	0	No	Could not be located after 1990.
Partula salifana	EX	0	No	Dead shells were found in 1989.
Partula similaris	LC	?	No	Tolerant of habitat loss and free of predators.
Partula suturalis	EW	0	Yes	2/2 subspecies survive.
Partula taeniata	CR	2	Yes	3/4 subspecies survive.
Partula tohiveana	CR	1	Yes	Wild-born individuals have become more and more common in recent years, suggesting a population is established. First invertebrate species to be downgraded from EW to CR on the IUCN Red List.
Partula tristis	EX	0	Misidentified	Could not be located after 1990.
Partula turgida	EX	0	Formerly	Last captive individual died in 1992.
Partula umbilicata	EX	0	No	Could not be located after 1980.
Partula vanikorensis	CR	1	No	Endemic to Vanikoro.
Partula varia	EW	0	Yes	

=== Collected for ex situ conservation ===
The Partula that were collected for ex situ breeding include the following:

Tahiti – P. affinis, P. clara, P. compressa (P. otaheitana), P. hyalina, P. nodosa

Moorea – P. aurantia, P. mirabilis, P. mooreana, P. suturalis, P. taeniata, P. tohiveana

Huahine – P. arguta, P. rosea, P. varia

Raiatea – P. clarkei (P. turgida), P. dolorosa, P. faba, P. garrettii (P. tristis), P. hebe, Partula labrusca, P. navigatoria (P. dentifera)

Marianas – P. gibba, P. lutaensis (P. langfordi)

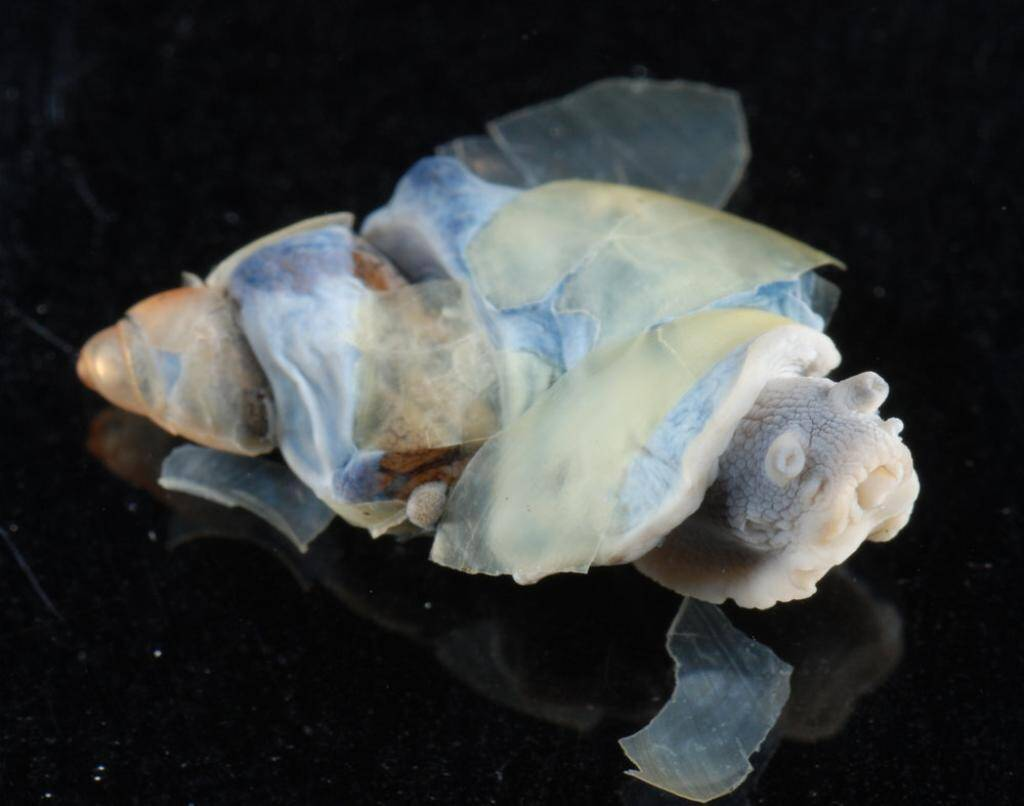
Partula snail with its shell removed

P. garrettii and P. navigatoria were misidentified as the species in parentheses next to them.

=== Surviving species ===
The list of surviving species are as follows:

Tahiti – P. affinis, P. clara, P. hyalina, P. incrassa, P. nodosa, P. otaheitana

Moorea – P. mirabilis, P. mooreana, P. suturalis, P. taeniata, P. tohiveana

Huahine – P. rosea, P. varia

Raiatea – P. garrettii (P. tristis), P. hebe, P. meyeri, P. navigatoria (P. dentifera)

Marianas – P. gibba, P. lutaensis, P. radiolata

Micronesia – P. emersoni

Fiji – P. leefei, P. lirata

Solomon Islands – P. cramptoni, P. micans

Papua New Guinea – P. auraniana, P. similaris

Cook Islands – P. assimilis

== Cladogram ==
Phylogenetic analyses revealed that many of the Partula species are not monophyletic. The resulting cladogram is shown below.

- Partulidae
  - - Partula
      - - - - - - P. aurantia
                - P. suturalis dendronica
                - P. suturalis strigosa
                - P. suturalis vexillum
              - P. suturalis strigosa
              - - P. suturalis vexillum
            - - P. clara
              - P. mirabilis
              - P. suturalis vexillum
              - P. hyalina
            - - - P. varia
                - - P. rosea
              - P. hebe
              - - P. hebe bella
          - - - P. clara
              - P. exigua
              - P. mooreana
              - P. taeniata elongata
              - P. taeniata nucleola
              - P. taeniata simulans
              - P. taeniata
            - - P. clara
              - P. taeniata nucleola
            - P. mooreana
            - P. tohivea
          - - (undescribed species)
            - - P. otaheitana otaheitana
              - - P. otaheitana lignaria
                - P. otaheitana sinistralis
                - P. otaheitana sinistrorsa
              - - P. otaheitana crassa
                - P. producta
          - P. hyalina (Austral Islands, etc.)
          - P. hyalina (Tahiti)
          - P. mooreana
          - P. mirabilis propinqua
          - P. tohiveana
        - - - P. dentifera
            - - P. dentifera
              - P. tristis
              - - P. meyeri
          - - P. faba
            - - P. turgida
        - - P. assimilis
          - P. luteola
        - P. gibba
        - P. radiolata
        - P. carteriensis
        - P. similaris
      - - - - P. otaheitana
            - P. otaheitana affinis
            - - P. affinis
              - - P. otaheitana
                - - P. otaheitana rubescens
          - - - (undescribed species)
              - - P. otaheitana crassa
            - - P. nodosa composita
              - P. nodosa intermedia
        - P. subgonochila
      - P. auraniana
      - P. turneri
      - P. lirata
    - Samoana
      - - Samoana decussatula
        - - Samoana attenuata
          - Samoana burchi
      - Samoana conica
      - Samoana thurstoni
      - - Samoana fragilis
        - Palaopartula
          - Palaopartula thetis
          - Palaopartula calypso
  - Eua
    - Eua globosa
    - - Eua zebrina

== Ecology ==
Partula species on Tahiti were usually found on the undersides of the leaves of Caladium and plantain, although in some valleys, they were frequently found on Dracaena and turmeric.

== Gallery ==
=== Tahitian species ===
Partula affinis

Partula clara

Partula hyalina

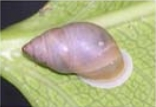
Partula incrassa

Partula nodosa

Partula otaheitana

=== Moorean species ===
Partula mirabilis

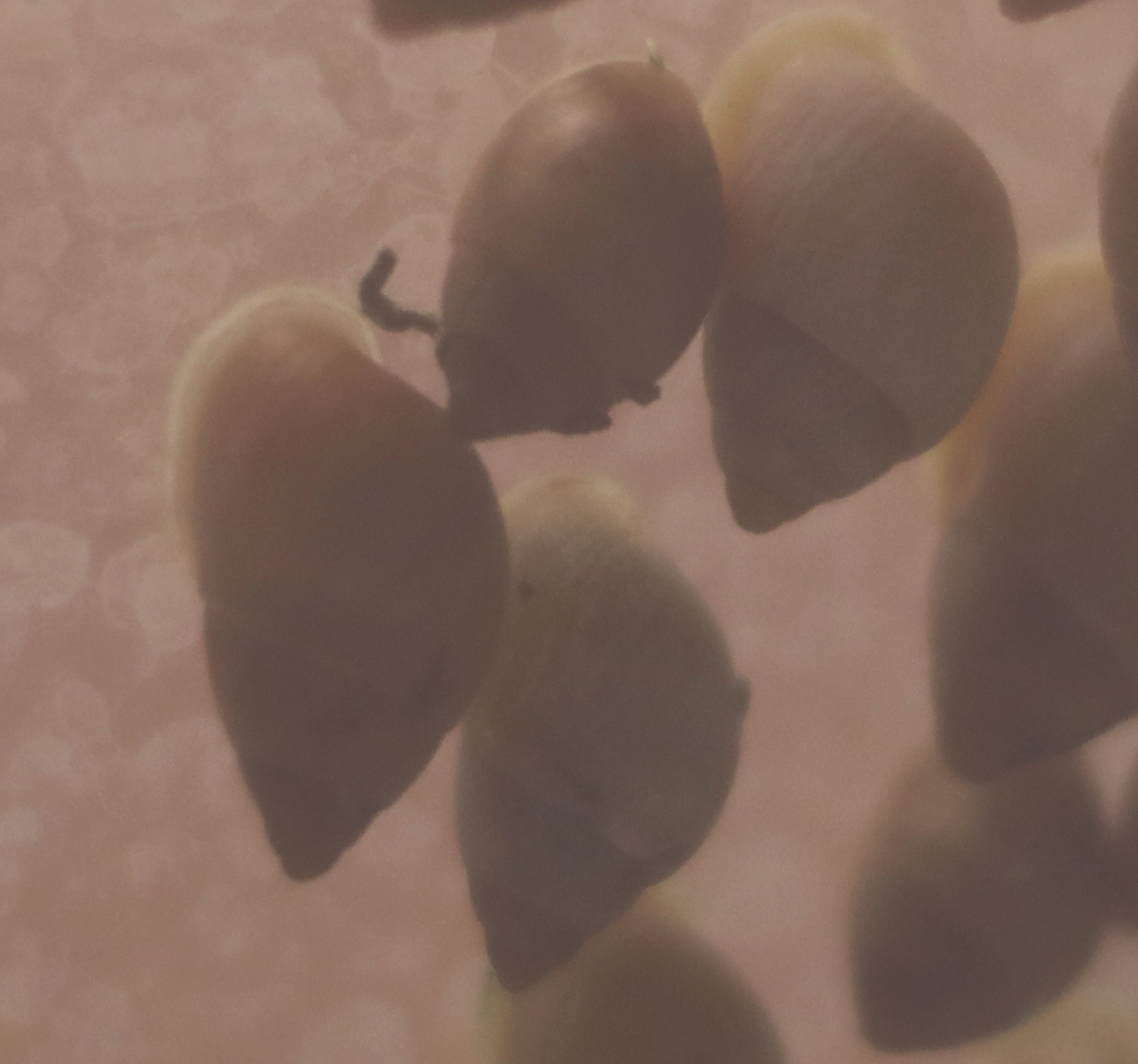
Partula mooreana

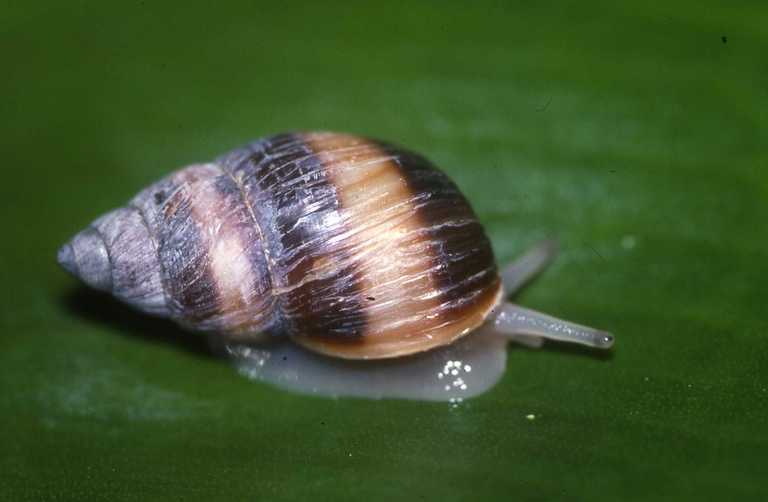
Partula suturalis

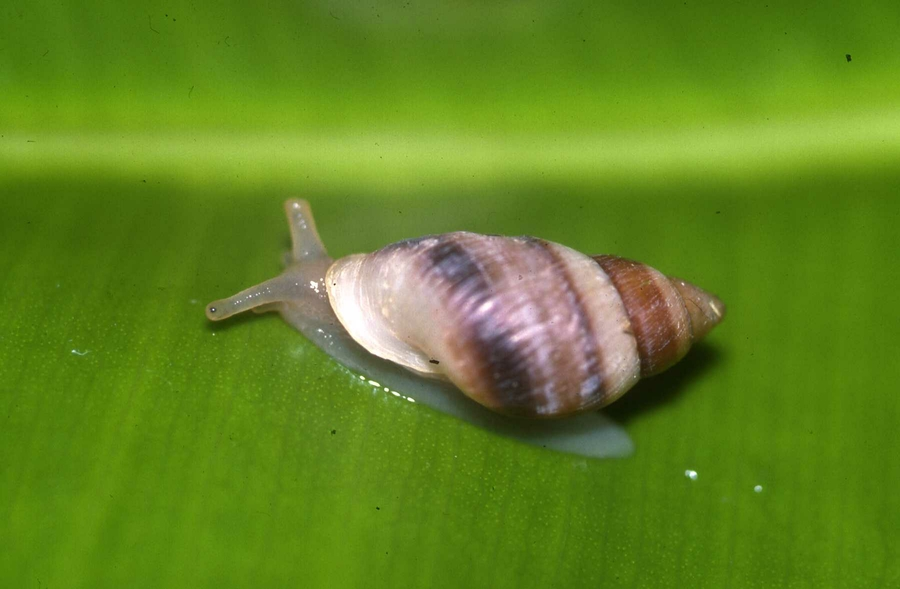
Partula taeniata

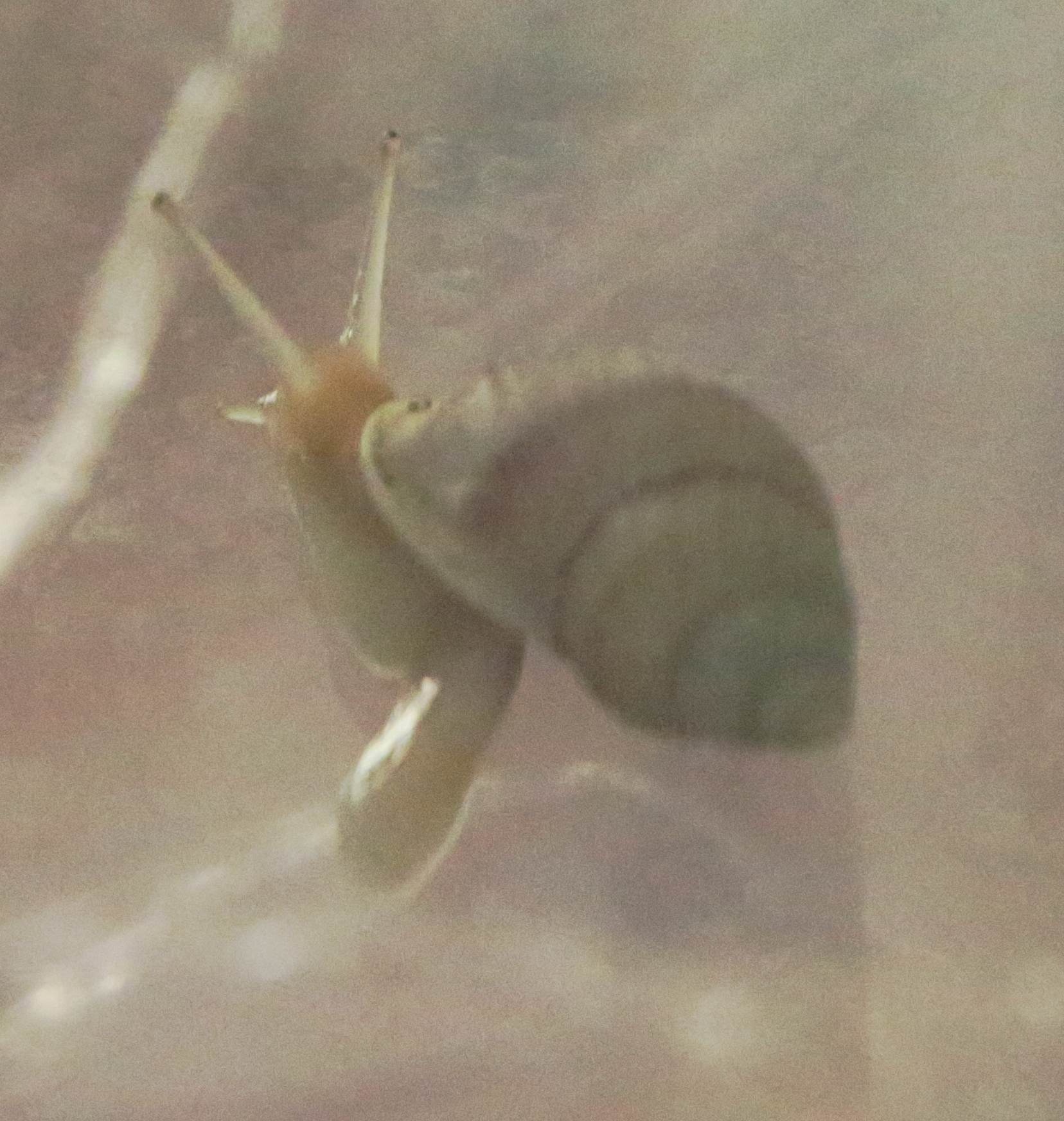
Partula tohiveana

=== Huahine species ===
Partula rosea

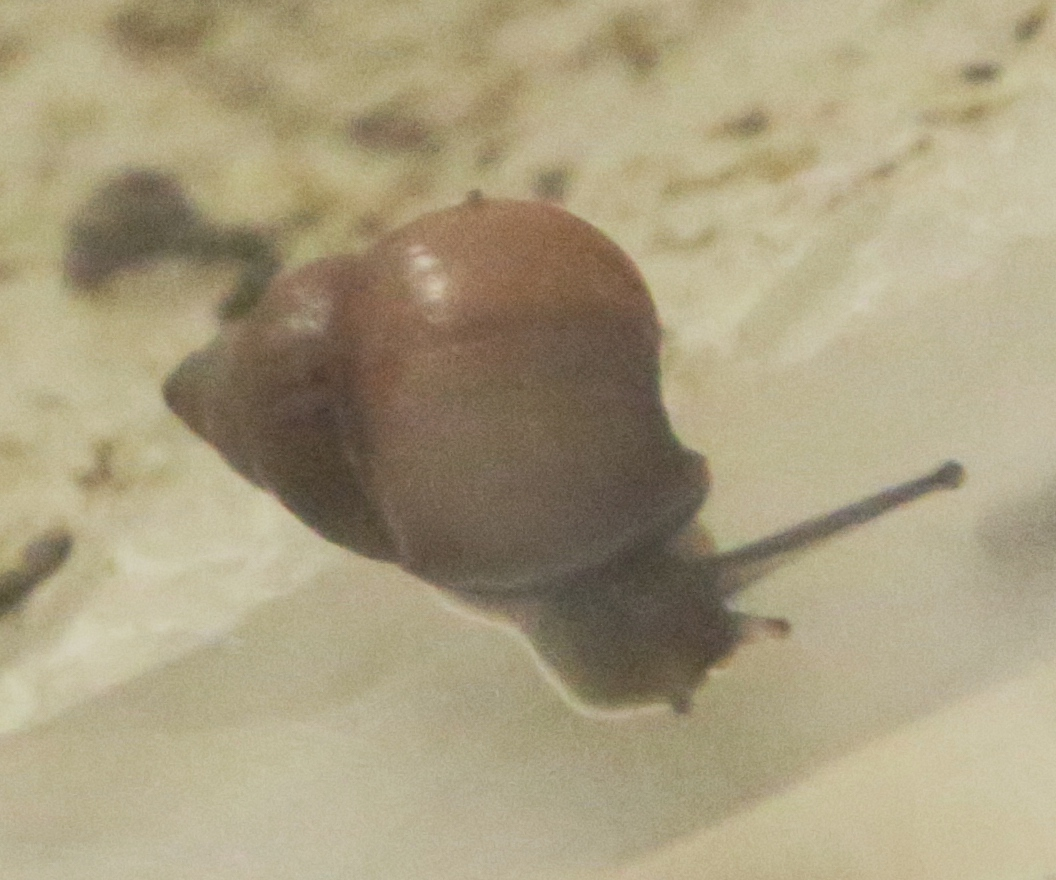
Partula varia

=== Raiatean species ===
Partula garrettii

Partula hebe

Partula navigatoria

=== Mariana Islands species ===
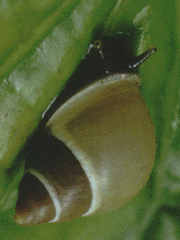
Partula gibba

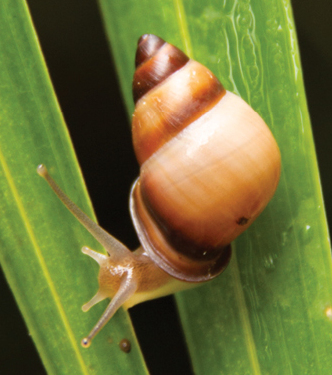
Partula lutaensis

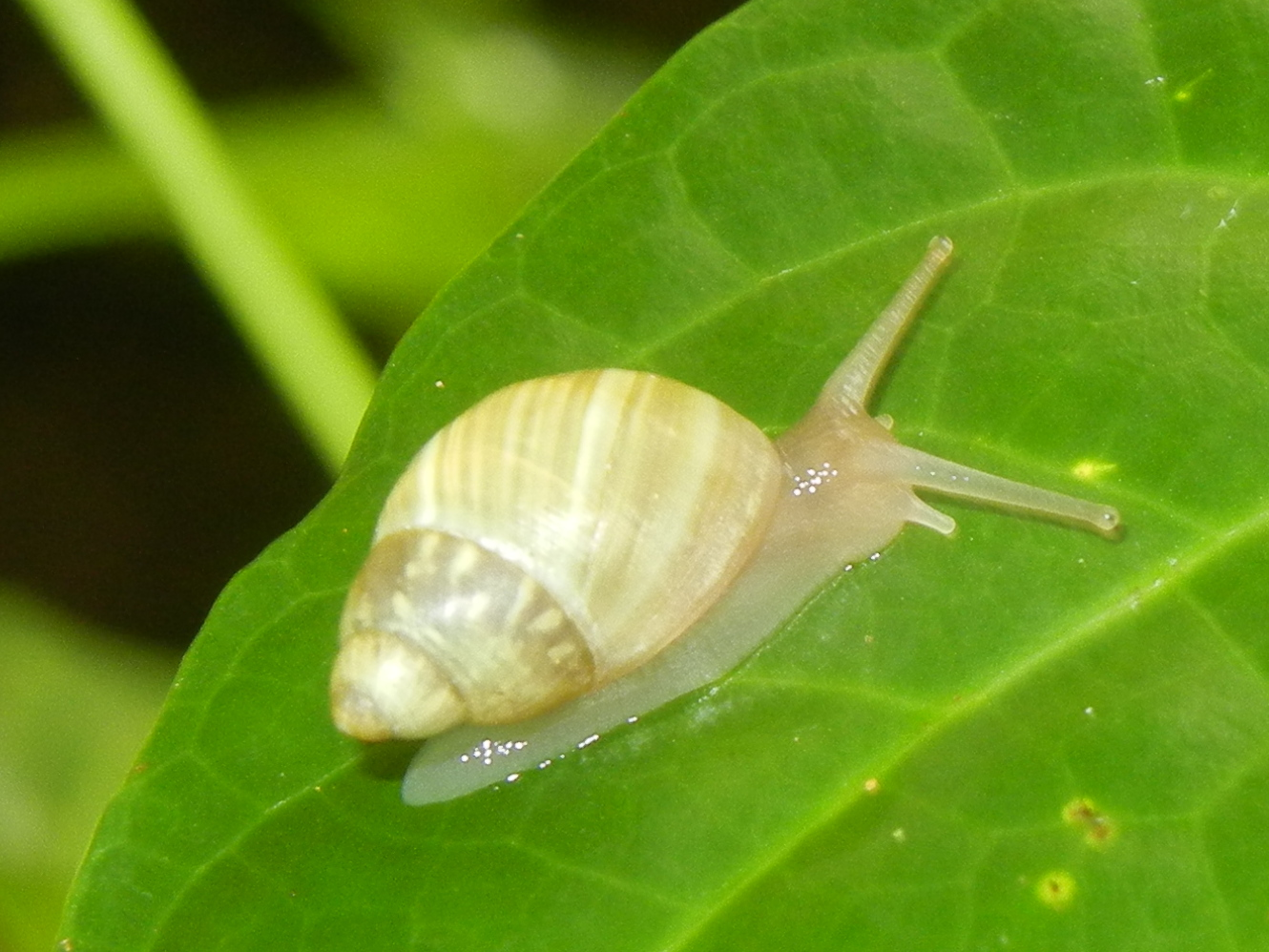
Partula radiolata

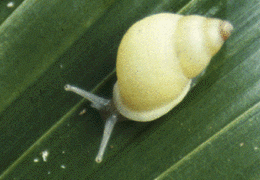
Partula langfordi (extinct)
