= Mangarevan expedition =

1934 scientific expedition

The Mangarevan expedition of 1934 was a scientific expedition to investigate the natural history of the farthest southeastern islands of Polynesia, including Mangareva. It was a comprehensive natural history expedition of a kind more common during the previous century.

Sponsored by the Bernice P. Bishop Museum of Honolulu, Hawaii and led by the malacologist Charles Montague Cooke Jr., the expedition's research team included the ethnologists Kenneth P. Emory and Peter H. Buck, the botanists Harold St. John and F. Raymond Fosberg, the malacologists Donald Anderson and Yoshio Kondo, and the undergraduate entomologist E. C. Zimmerman. After visiting 56 islands on a voyage of over 14,000 kilometers over a period of six months, they returned with an enormous quantity of data, including perhaps the richest collection ever made of plants in Polynesia.

The main party sailed aboard a converted Japanese fishing vessel, the Myojin Maru renamed the Islander, while Emory led another team aboard the Tiare Tahiti to survey Mangareva and the Tuamotu Islands. During 14 weeks on relatively isolated Napuka Atoll in the Tuamotus, Emory's team collected 200 ethnographic artifacts and recorded 90 songs and chants, along with genealogies and oral histories that remain among of "the most important sources of traditional eastern Polynesian temple ritual." Some of their more colorful adventures and hardships on the atoll are described in the book Road My Body Goes (1937) by the journalist Clifford Gessler, who almost died there from a poisonous coral cut.
