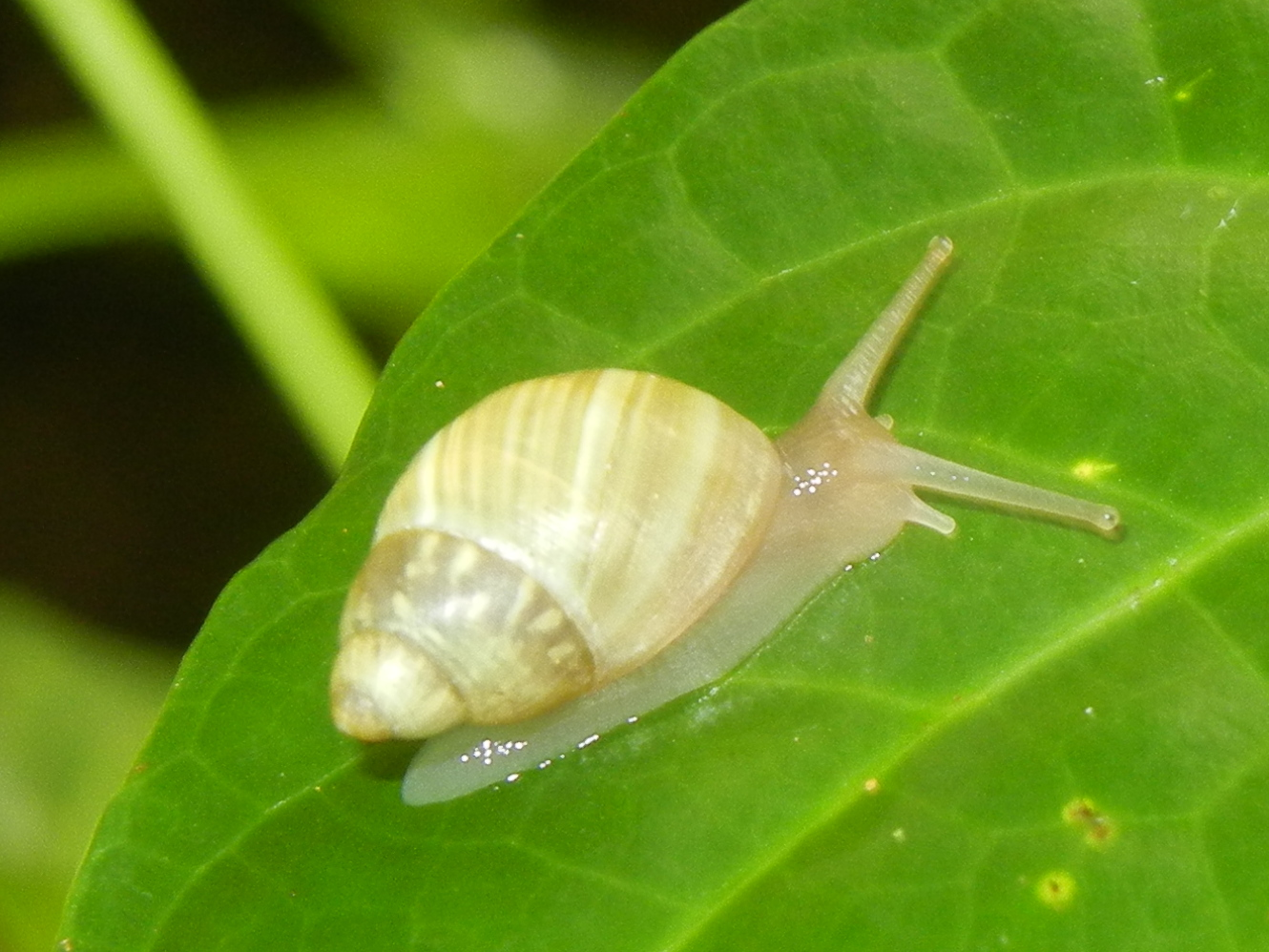

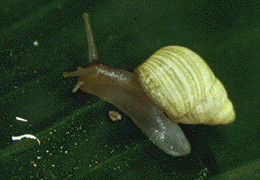

Conservation status
- Endangered (IUCN 3.1)

Scientific classification
- Kingdom: Animalia
- Phylum: Mollusca
- Class: Gastropoda
- Order: Stylommatophora
- Family: Partulidae
- Genus: Partula
- Species: P. radiolata

Binomial name
- Partula radiolata (Pfeiffer, 1846)

= Partula radiolata =

Species of gastropod

Partula radiolata, common name the radiolate partula or Guam streaked tree snail, is a species of air-breathing tropical land snail, a terrestrial pulmonate gastropod mollusk in the family Partulidae. This species is endemic to Guam.

== See also ==
- List of land snails of the Mariana Islands
