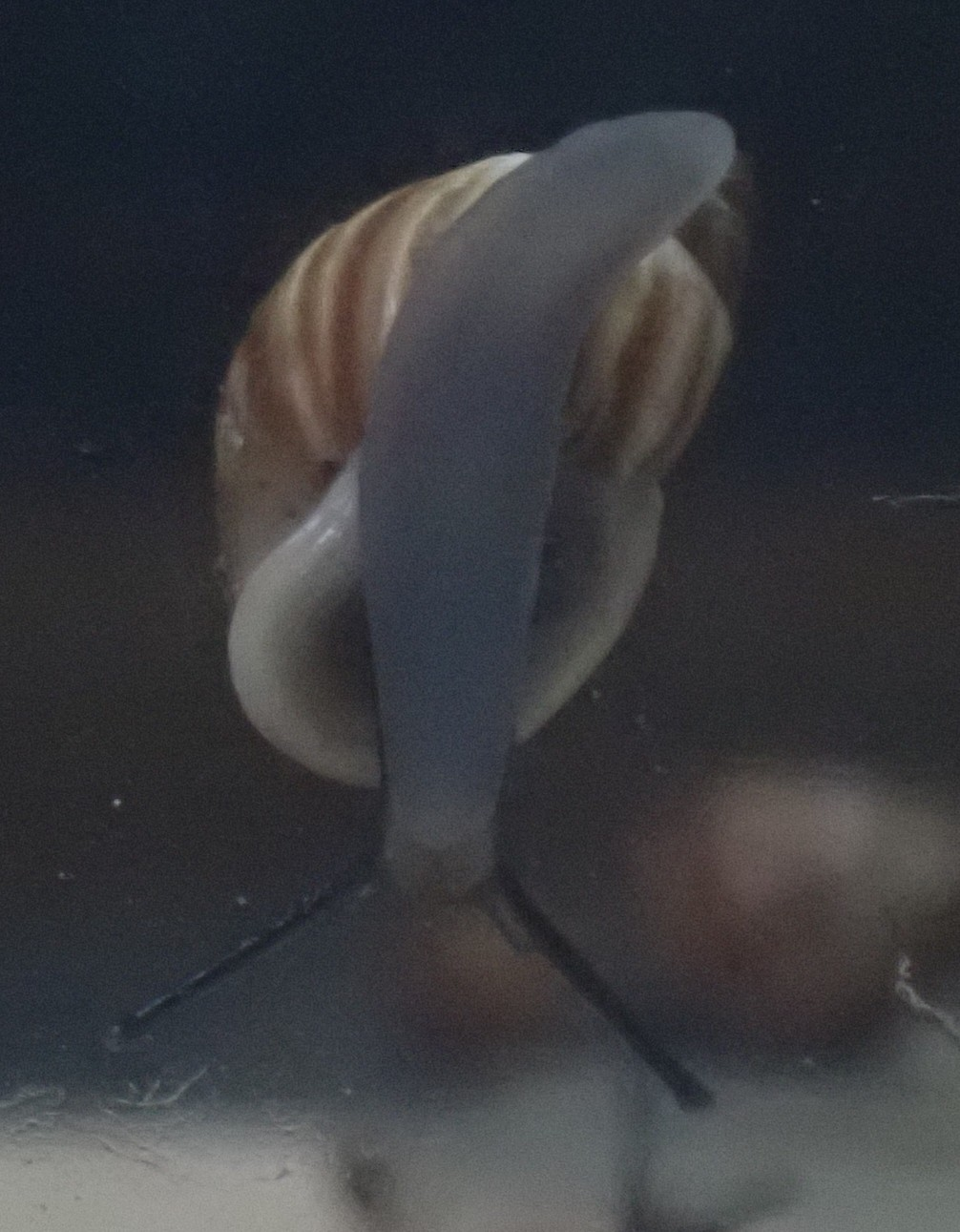
- At Woodland Park Zoo

Conservation status
- Extinct in the Wild (IUCN 3.1)

Scientific classification
- Kingdom: Animalia
- Phylum: Mollusca
- Class: Gastropoda
- Order: Stylommatophora
- Family: Partulidae
- Genus: Partula
- Species: P. nodosa

Binomial name
- Partula nodosa L. Pfeiffer, 1853

Synonyms
- Partula nodosa var. composita H. E. Crampton, 1916; Partula nodosa var. exigua H. E. Crampton, 1916; Partula nodosa var. intermedia H. E. Crampton, 1916; Partula nodosa var. laeva Pilsbry, 1909; Partula nodosa var. sinistralis A. G. Mayer, 1902; junior subjective synonym; Partula trilineata Pease, 1866

= Partula nodosa =

Species of gastropod

Partula nodosa, commonly known as the Polynesian tree snail, is a small species of air-breathing tropical land snail, a terrestrial pulmonate gastropod mollusk in the family Partulidae. It lived exclusively on the western side of Tahiti in French Polynesia, but due to invasive predators, is now extinct in the wild. The species remains extant within captive breeding programs.

== Distribution and conservation ==
This species was endemic to Tahiti, French Polynesia. It was known to live in trees within a series of 7 valleys on the west coast of the island. It is now extinct in the wild. The primary cause of their extinction was predation by the Rosy wolf snail, which was introduced to the island in 1977. No living specimens have been found since the 1980s, and the species only survives in captive breeding programs. Reintroduction efforts have been attempted since 2016, but have not been proven successful. The species has been noted to do well in these captive environments. In addition to the Rosy wolf snail, the predatory flatworm Platydemus manokwari also poses risks to reintroduced populations.

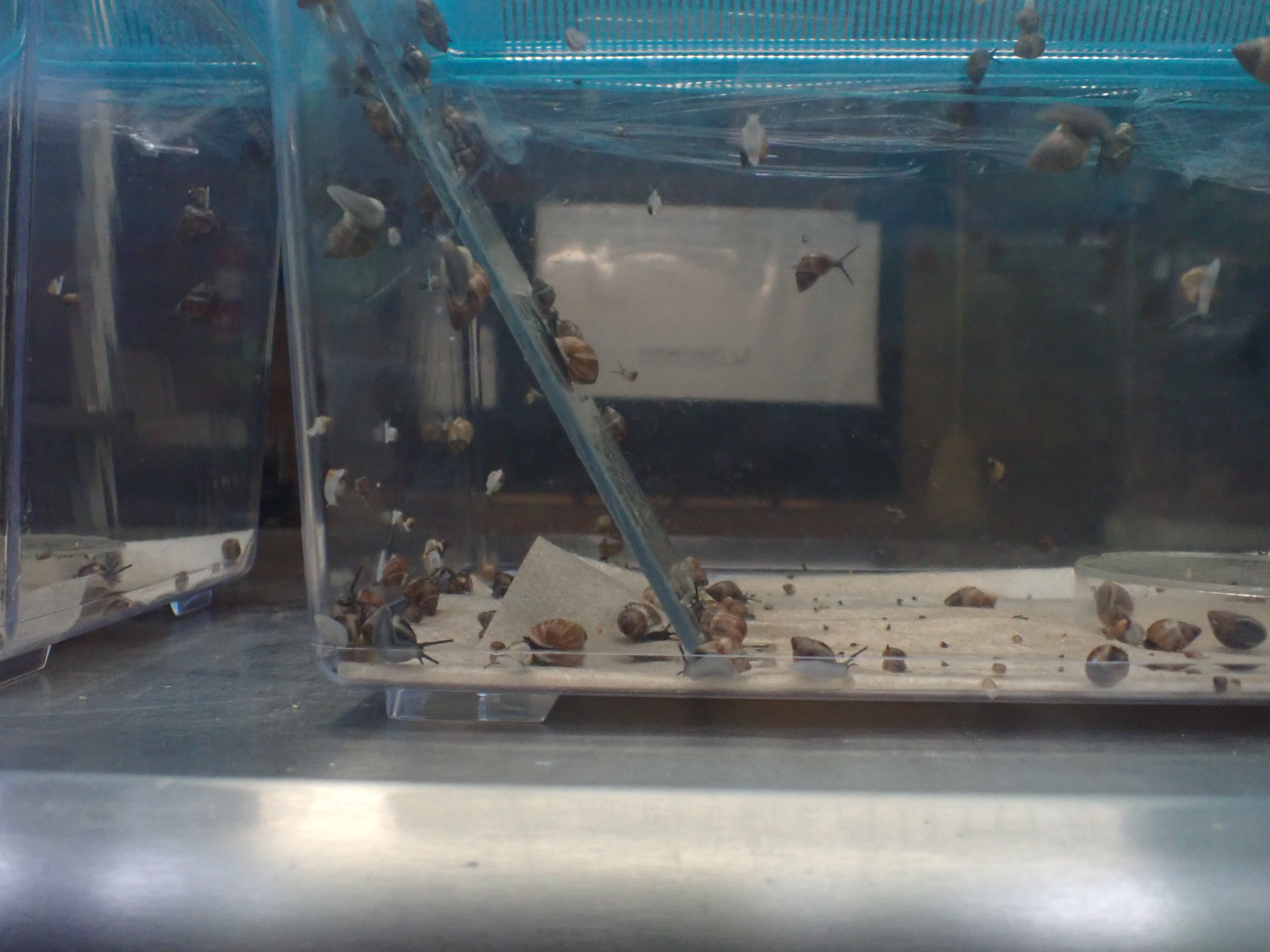
In a captive breeding program at the Woodland Park Zoo

== Description ==
The shell of Partula nodosa is somewhere between conical and ovate in shape, and is 16 mm (0.63 in) in length and 8 mm (0.31 in) in diameter. It possesses 4.5 or 5.5 shell revolutions (whorls), forming a conical spire that terminates in an acute angle. Each whorl is very slightly convex, almost flat, and sutures between whorls are slightly inset. The shell opening (aperture) is round, but oblong, with a relatively rounded, thick outer edge (lip).

The shell is patterned with 3-dimensional structures (called sculpture), consisting of large lines that run parallel to the whorls, as well as smaller lines that run perpendicularly. The coloration of the species is variable, ranging from cream colored to a reddish brown, with stripes that run parallel to the whorls.

== Human Uses ==
Partula nodosa shells were historically used to make necklaces, though they are not currently used in this way.
