= Partula meyeri =

Meyer's tree snail
- The holotype of Partula meyeri photographed in 2005.

Conservation status
- Critically Endangered (IUCN 3.1)

Scientific classification
- Kingdom: Animalia
- Phylum: Mollusca
- Class: Gastropoda
- Order: Stylommatophora
- Family: Partulidae
- Genus: Partula
- Species: P. meyeri

Binomial name
- Partula meyeri Burch, 2007

Synonyms
- Samoana meyeri

Species of gastropod

Partula meyeri (syn. Samoana meyeri) is a species of tropical, air-breathing land snail, a terrestrial, pulmonate, gastropod mollusc in the family Partulidae.

== Etymology ==
The species is named in honour of its discoverer, Jean-Yves Meyer.

== Distribution and habitat ==
P. meyeri is known only from Mount Tefatua (also called Mount Toomaru), the highest peak on the island of Raiatea in the Society Islands, French Polynesia. The holotype and two other specimens, the only ones recorded so far, were collected in a wet gulch at about 950 metres (3,120 ft) elevation, just below the mountain summit. The three snails were observed aestivating on the leaves of montane vegetation; the typical daytime behaviour and habitat of Society Island partulids.

== Description ==
P. meyeri has a conical spire, evenly rounded whorls, and a brown, translucent shell with whorls terminating in a large, oval aperture (2/3 the shell length) that has a thin, expanded peristome. The shell measures approximately 16.5 mm (0.65 in) in length and 10.5 mm (0.41 in) in width.
