= Partula assimilis =

Conservation status
- Critically Endangered (IUCN 3.1)

Scientific classification
- Kingdom: Animalia
- Phylum: Mollusca
- Class: Gastropoda
- Order: Stylommatophora
- Family: Partulidae
- Genus: Partula
- Species: P. assimilis

Binomial name
- Partula assimilis Pease, 1868

Species of gastropod

Partula assimilis, also known as the Rarotonga tree snail, is a species of land snail that belongs to the family Partulidae. It is endemic to the island of Rarotonga, which is located in Cook Islands.
