= Partula magistri =

Conservation status
- Extinct (IUCN 3.1)

Scientific classification
- Kingdom: Animalia
- Phylum: Mollusca
- Class: Gastropoda
- Order: Stylommatophora
- Family: Partulidae
- Genus: Partula
- Species: †P. magistri

Binomial name
- †Partula magistri Gerlach, 2016

Extinct species of gastropod

Partula magistri was a species of air-breathing land snail, a terrestrial pulmonate gastropod mollusk in the family Partulidae.

It was endemic to the island of Raiatea in the Society Islands of French Polynesia. It is known from a single shell collected in 1992, and no individuals have been found since then.

The International Union for Conservation of Nature officially declared this species extinct in June 2024. Like many other snails of the Society Islands, its extinction can be attributed to the introduction of the rosy wolfsnail (Euglandina rosea).
