= Partula faba =

Captain Cook's bean snail
- Live bean snails found in the wild in 1992.

Conservation status
- Extinct (2016) (IUCN 3.1)

Scientific classification
- Kingdom: Animalia
- Phylum: Mollusca
- Class: Gastropoda
- Order: Stylommatophora
- Family: Partulidae
- Genus: Partula
- Species: †P. faba

Binomial name
- †Partula faba (Gmelin, 1791)

Extinct species of snail

Partula faba, commonly known as the bean snail, Partula snail, or Captain Cook's bean snail, (Note: Thomas Martyn, on the voyage of discovery with James Cook, named the snail Limax faba (bean snail) but left no record as to why.) is an extinct species of air-breathing tropical land snail, a terrestrial pulmonate gastropod mollusk in the family Partulidae. This species was endemic to Ra'iātea and Tahaa, neighbouring islands which share the same lagoon, in French Polynesia. The species was the first Partula to be recorded.

== Decline ==
In 1978, the giant African land snail, an invasive species, arrived into French Polynesia. The giant African snails wreaked havoc on the environment in Ra'iātea. In the 1980s, as a counter measure against giant African land snails, ecologists introduced the small carnivorous snail Euglandina rosea, in an attempt to control the population. Instead of targeting the giant African snails, however, E. rosea targeted many native species of Partulidae, among them Partula faba, as they were easier to attack and eat.

=== In captivity ===
By 1992, scientists were concerned with the bean snail's population size. Justin Gerlach, now a fellow from Cambridge University, traveled to Ra'iātea to capture as many individuals of bean snails as possible. During his search, he went through a valley that had been swept through by E. rosea only a week prior, finding "hundreds of empty [bean snail] shells." Gerlach found only one bean snail in the entire valley. Shortly after, Gerlach found an old vanilla plantation where the predatory snails had not swept through, finding "dozens" of bean snails. These snails, believed to be the last of their kind, were put into tupperware containers, and flown to the United Kingdom, with some individuals eventually being sent to the Bristol Zoo.

While at the Bristol Zoo, conservationists provided numerous resources into breeding programs of the bean snail. Melissa Bushell, one of the keepers of the bean snails during this time, described giving them a twice-weekly food regimen of oats, trout food pellets, and cuttlebone, as well as replacing the plastic wrap coverings of their enclosure. Conservationists and other zoo employees watched to see if the bean snails would reproduce. Offspring was produced, but for unknown reasons, their net replacement rate was not high enough to avoid extinction (i.e., the number of snails born was not greater than the number of snails dying). Postmortem, snails were dissected, preserved, and studied under microscopy, but no cause was ever determined for this phenomenon.

Since the end of 2010, the captive bean snail population had decreased from 80 individuals to just 9. On September 16, 2014, the snails were transferred to the Edinburgh Zoo. Within a year, eight of the remaining snails died, leaving the last known individual in captivity. Ross Poulter, the caretaker of the snails, checked on the last individual daily for around six months to see if it had reproduced, as some snail species can reproduce with themselves. However, the individual never reproduced, and the last bean snail died in February 2016. The snail was preserved in alcohol with the label "P. faba, last known individual."

== Subspecies ==
The species contained two subspecies.

- Partula faba ssp. faba – Ra'iātea
- Partula faba ssp. subangulata – Tahaa
