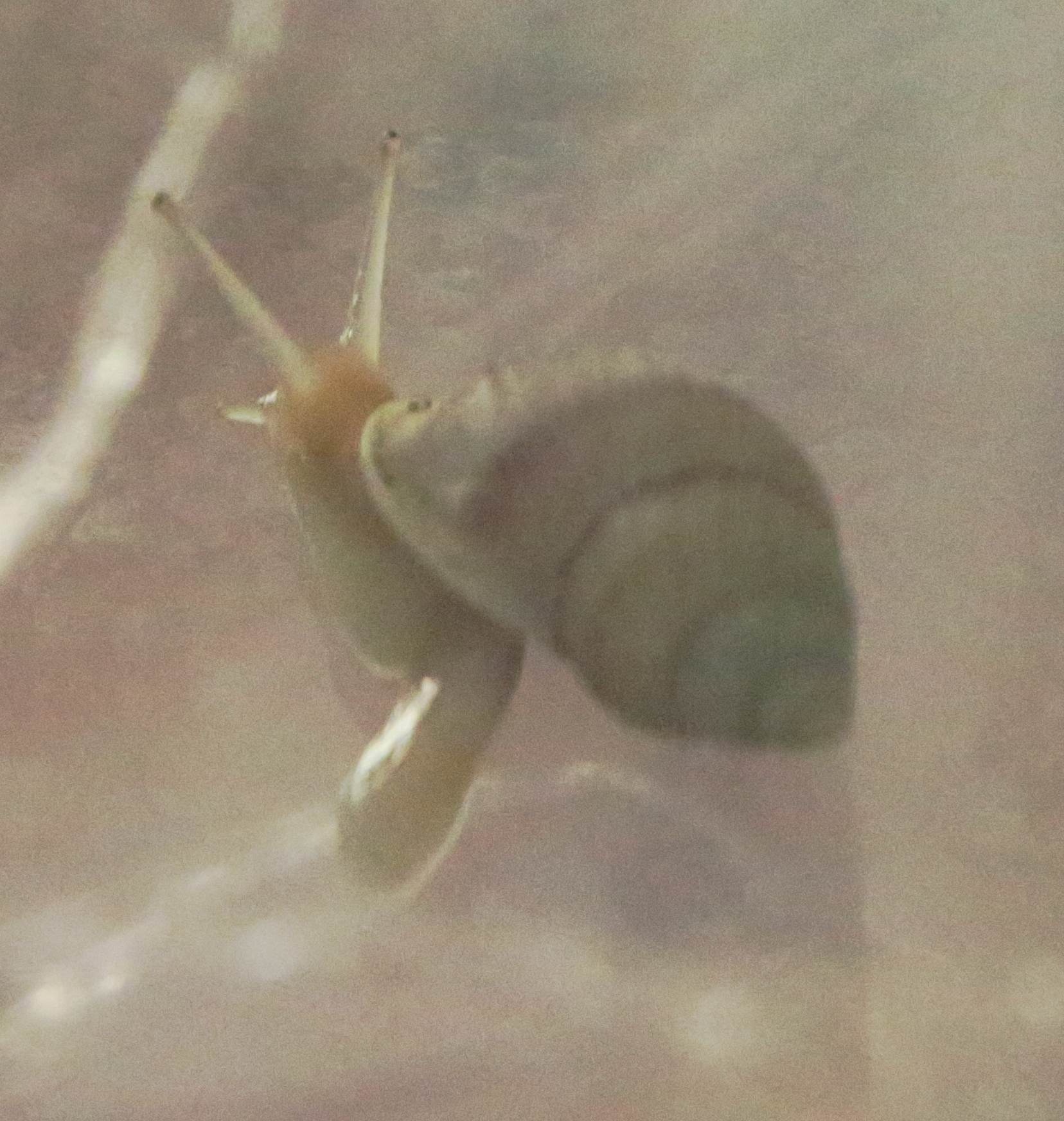

Conservation status
- Critically Endangered (IUCN 3.1)

Scientific classification
- Kingdom: Animalia
- Phylum: Mollusca
- Class: Gastropoda
- Order: Stylommatophora
- Family: Partulidae
- Genus: Partula
- Species: P. tohiveana

Binomial name
- Partula tohiveana Crampton, 1924

= Partula tohiveana =

Tohiea tree snail

Species of gastropod

Partula tohiveana, the Tohiea tree snail, is a partulid endemic to Moorea, and therefore one of several species with the common name Moorean viviparous tree snail. This species is a species of air-breathing tropical land snail, a terrestrial pulmonate gastropod mollusk in the family Partulidae. It is endemic to highlands on Moorea, French Polynesia.

In September 2024, following a reintroduction campaign by Cambridge University and several zoos across the world, "born in the wild" snails have been observed for the first time in 40 years, thus, the species is officially considered re-established. It is now critically endangered, where it had previously been extinct in the wild since the 1980s.

Partula tohiveana is the first invertebrate species to successfully be re-established following an Extinct in the Wild IUCN status.
