= Partula mirabilis =

Moorean viviparous tree snail

Conservation status
- Extinct in the Wild (IUCN 3.1)

Scientific classification
- Kingdom: Animalia
- Phylum: Mollusca
- Class: Gastropoda
- Order: Stylommatophora
- Family: Partulidae
- Genus: Partula
- Species: P. mirabilis

Binomial name
- Partula mirabilis Crampton, 1924

Species of gastropod

Partula mirabilis, common name the Moorean viviparous tree snail, is a species of air-breathing tropical land snail, a terrestrial pulmonate gastropod mollusk in the family Partulidae. This species was endemic to the island of Moorea, French Polynesia. It is now extinct in the wild.

== Subspecies ==
Subspecies of this species included:

- Partula mirabilis propinqua Crampton, 1932
