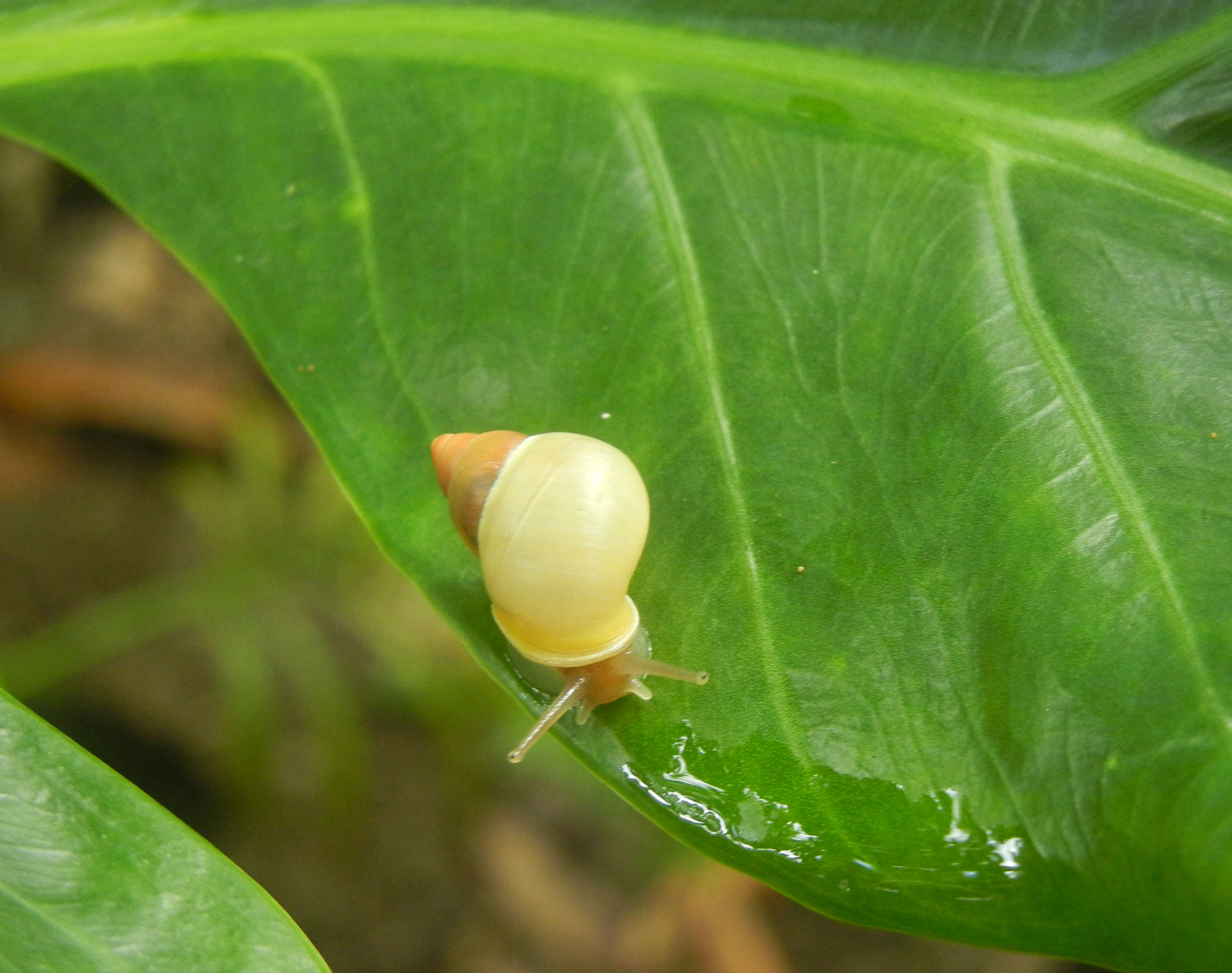

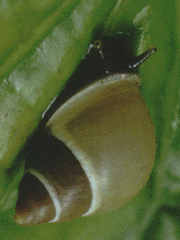

Conservation status
- Endangered (IUCN 3.1)

Scientific classification
- Kingdom: Animalia
- Phylum: Mollusca
- Class: Gastropoda
- Order: Stylommatophora
- Family: Partulidae
- Genus: Partula
- Species: P. gibba

Binomial name
- Partula gibba Férussac, 1821

Synonyms
- Partula bicolor Pease, 1872; Partula mastersi L. Pfeiffer, 1853

= Fat Guam partula =

Species of gastropod

The fat Guam partula or humped tree snail, scientific name Partula gibba, is an endangered species of air-breathing land snail, a terrestrial gastropod mollusk in the family Partulidae.

== Distribution ==
This species occurs throughout the Mariana Archipelago, and has been reported in the greatest densities and population sizes on the isle of Sarigan.

== Ecology ==
On Sarigan, the species has been recorded most frequently in high-elevation native forests on the trunks of large Erythrina variegata specimens, often resting at the base of branches. On 19 May 2015 specimens were found consuming the Pandanus-fruit ejecta of the Mariana fruit bat on the leaves of a Pandanus tectorius tree. Mariana partulids have been noted to consume plant material, both living and decaying.

== See also ==
List of land snails of the Mariana Islands
