= Partula incrassa exigua =

Moorean viviparous tree snail

Conservation status
- Extinct (IUCN 3.1)

Scientific classification
- Kingdom: Animalia
- Phylum: Mollusca
- Class: Gastropoda
- Order: Stylommatophora
- Family: Partulidae
- Genus: Partula
- Species: P. incrassa
- Subspecies: P. i. exigua

Trinomial name
- Partula incrassa exigua H. E. Crampton, 1932

Synonyms
- Partula exigua H. E. Crampton, 1932

Species of gastropod

Partula incrassa exigua, commonly known as the Moorean viviparous tree snail, was a subspecies of air-breathing tropical land snail, a terrestrial pulmonate gastropod mollusk in the family Partulidae. This subspecies was endemic to the island of Moorea in French Polynesia. It is now extinct.
