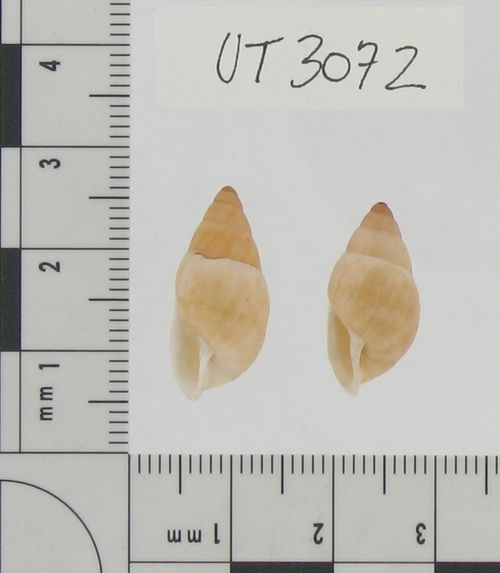
- Shells

Conservation status
- Endangered (IUCN 3.1)

Scientific classification
- Kingdom: Animalia
- Phylum: Mollusca
- Class: Gastropoda
- Order: Stylommatophora
- Family: Partulidae
- Genus: Partula
- Species: P. otaheitana

Binomial name
- Partula otaheitana (Bruguière, 1792)

= Partula otaheitana =

Species of gastropod

Partula otaheitana is a species of air-breathing tropical land snail, a terrestrial pulmonate gastropod mollusk in the family Partulidae. This species is endemic to the island of Tahiti, French Polynesia, where it was formerly widely found in the valleys but is now restricted to the highest altitudes.
