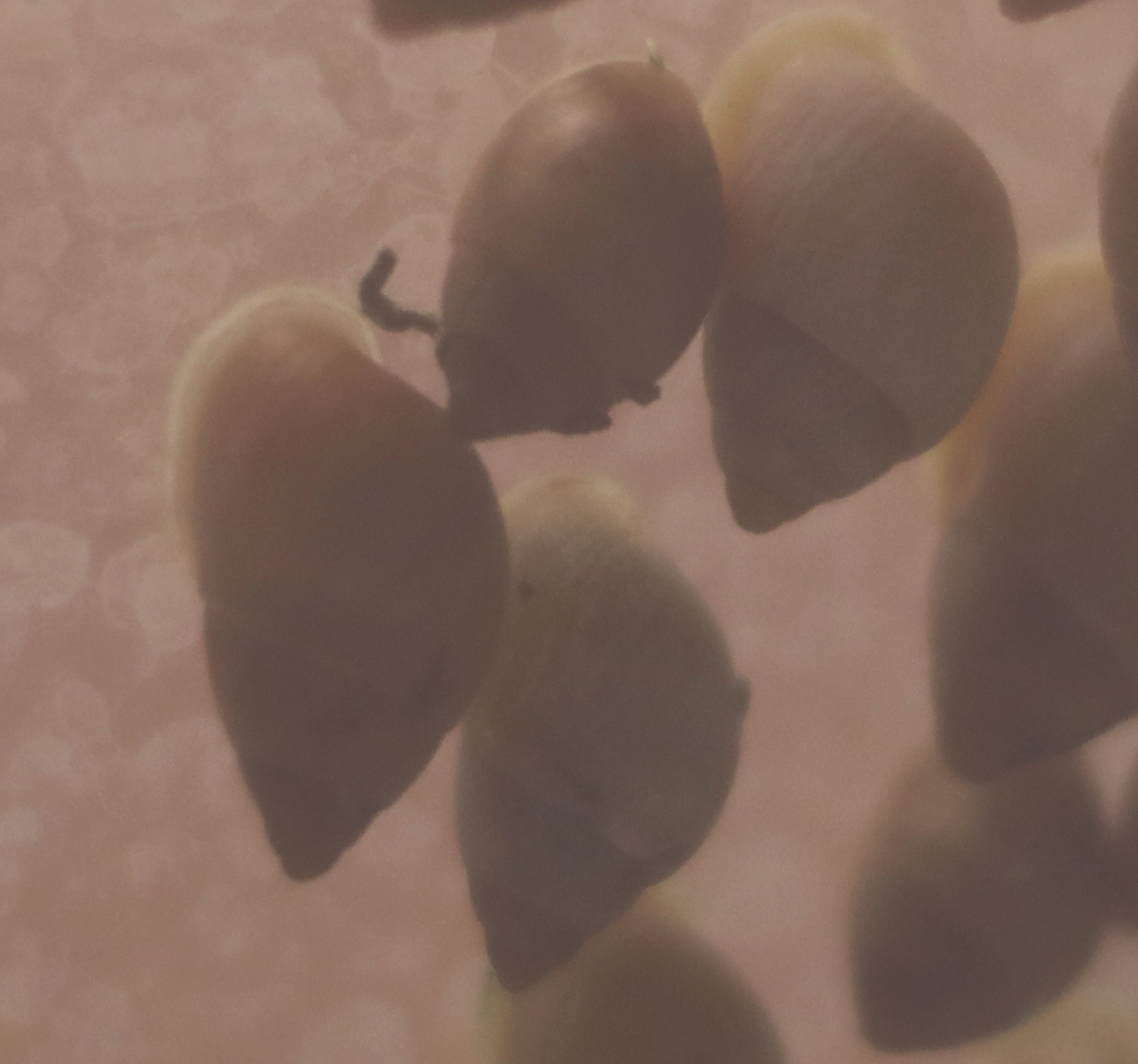

Conservation status
- Extinct in the Wild (IUCN 3.1)

Scientific classification
- Kingdom: Animalia
- Phylum: Mollusca
- Class: Gastropoda
- Order: Stylommatophora
- Family: Partulidae
- Genus: Partula
- Species: P. mooreana

Binomial name
- Partula mooreana W. D. Hartman, 1880

= Partula mooreana =

Moorean viviparous tree snail

Species of gastropod

Partula mooreana, common name the Moorean viviparous tree snail, is a species of air-breathing tropical land snail, a terrestrial pulmonate gastropod mollusk in the family Partulidae. This species was endemic to French Polynesia. It is now extinct in the wild.

== Original description ==
Partula mooreana was originally described by William Dell Hartman (1817–1899) in 1880. Hartman's original text (the type description) reads as follows:

Partula Mooreana, Hartman.

Shell sinistral, ovate, elongate, thin, translucent, pale yellowish horn-color, apex darker; whorls 5, flatly convex, body whorl, with or without from one to three narrow, pale, brown revolving bands; surface smooth, with fine, oblique striations, which are decussated by crowded waved spiral striae; a narrow white line beneath the suture; aperture hearly half the length of the shell, lip white, moderately reflected, pillar tooth oval, prominent, situated nearest the superior angle, umbilicus open, moderately compressed.

Length 18 mill., diameter 9 mill.

Hab. — Vaianai Valley, Island of Moorea (Andrew Garrett, Esq.).

In one hundred and forty-six species and varieties of Partula represented in my collection, this shell possesses constant and well-marked specific characters. Mr. Garrett informs me that fifteen hundred specimens were all sinistral and dentate. The surface of the shell resembles P. spadicea and varieties from Moorea in possessing the thickly crowded waved spiral striae.

This species is arboreal, and is not uncommon on bushes, in

Vaianai Valley, the metropolis of P. vexillum Pse. = P. stenostoma Ph.
