= Partula labrusca =

Conservation status
- Extinct (IUCN 3.1)

Scientific classification
- Kingdom: Animalia
- Phylum: Mollusca
- Class: Gastropoda
- Order: Stylommatophora
- Family: Partulidae
- Genus: Partula
- Species: †P. labrusca

Binomial name
- †Partula labrusca Crampton & Cooke, 1953

Species of gastropod

Partula labrusca was a species of air-breathing land snail, a terrestrial pulmonate gastropod mollusk in the Partulidae family. This species was endemic in Raiatea, the Society Islands of French Polynesia.

== Extinction ==
After the introduction of the carnivorous snail Euglandina rosea in the late 1980s, native partulid species began disappearing rapidly. By 1992 there were few left. No live individuals were found during surveys in 1994 and 2000, or during subsequent scientific expeditions to high altitudes. The last individual died in the captive breeding programme in 2002.

In 1996, this species was assessed as "Extinct in the wild" as individuals still existed in a captive breeding programme, but not in the wild. In 2007, its Red List status was revised to Extinct, although it was actually recorded as going extinct in 2002.
