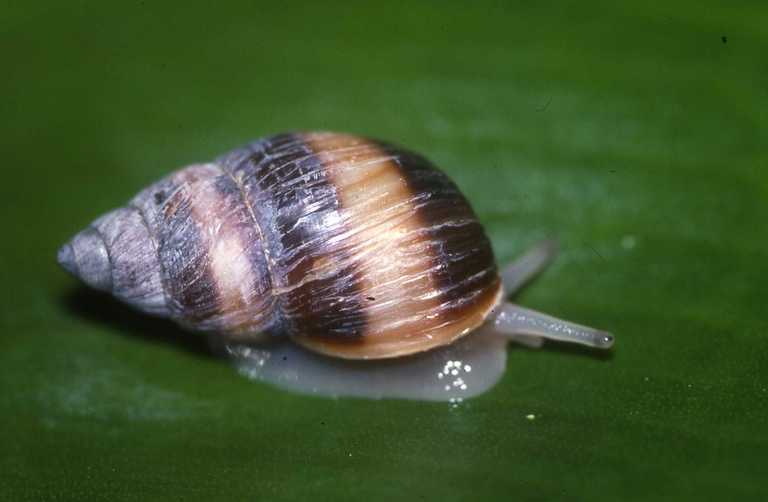

Conservation status
- Extinct in the Wild (IUCN 3.1)

Scientific classification
- Kingdom: Animalia
- Phylum: Mollusca
- Class: Gastropoda
- Order: Stylommatophora
- Family: Partulidae
- Genus: Partula
- Species: P. suturalis

Binomial name
- Partula suturalis Pfeiffer, 1855

= Partula suturalis =

Species of gastropod

Partula suturalis, commonly called the Moorean viviparous tree snail or the sutural partula, is a species of air-breathing tropical land snail, a terrestrial pulmonate gastropod mollusk in the family Partulidae. This species was endemic to the island of Moorea, French Polynesia. It is now extinct in the wild. It was previously listed as extinct in the IUCN Red List of Threatened Species, but has been moved to extinct in the wild since 2009. This error was the result of changing taxonomy (the subspecies were previously considered to be separate species).

== Subspecies ==
- Partula suturalis suturalis Pfeiffer, 1855 - extinct
- Partula suturalis dendroica Crampton, 1924
- Partula suturalis strigosa Pfeiffer, 1856 - extinct in the wild
- Partula suturalis vexillum Pease, 1866 - extinct in the wild

== Extinction in the wild ==
Partula suturalis was extirpated due to the introduction of the carnivorous land snail Euglandina rosea (the rosy wolfsnail). In 1977, biologists deliberately released the rosy wolfsnail onto Moorea in an effort to control a previously introduced invasive species, the giant African land snail, Lissachatina fulica. This release coincided with additional releases of rosy wolfsnails on Tahiti and other Society Islands in the 1980s and 1990s. The release of rosy wolfsnails on Moorea resulted in the extirpation of all 9 of the Moorean Partula species including Partula suturalis. By 1987, there were no remaining populations of Partula suturalis in the wild.

Interventions before extinction created captive populations of two of the four subspecies in international zoos and universities. The Partulid Global Species Management Programme manages the global captive population.

== Reintroduction efforts ==
Reintroduction of Moorean Partula snails, including Partula suturalis, was attempted in 1994. However, the field reserve created on Moorea struggled with repeated predator incursions and was shut down in 1998. The experiment was successful in validating that individuals bred in captivity were capable of reproducing in the wild. Continued reintroduction efforts will be challenged by the continued spread of the invasive rosy wolfsnail.
