= Partula aurantia =

Conservation status
- Extinct (IUCN 3.1)

Scientific classification
- Kingdom: Animalia
- Phylum: Mollusca
- Class: Gastropoda
- Order: Stylommatophora
- Family: Partulidae
- Genus: Partula
- Species: †P. aurantia

Binomial name
- †Partula aurantia Crampton, 1932

Species of gastropod

Partula aurantia, common name the Moorean viviparous tree snail, was a species of air-breathing tropical land snail, a terrestrial pulmonate gastropod mollusk in the family Partulidae. This species was endemic to French Polynesia. It is now extinct.
