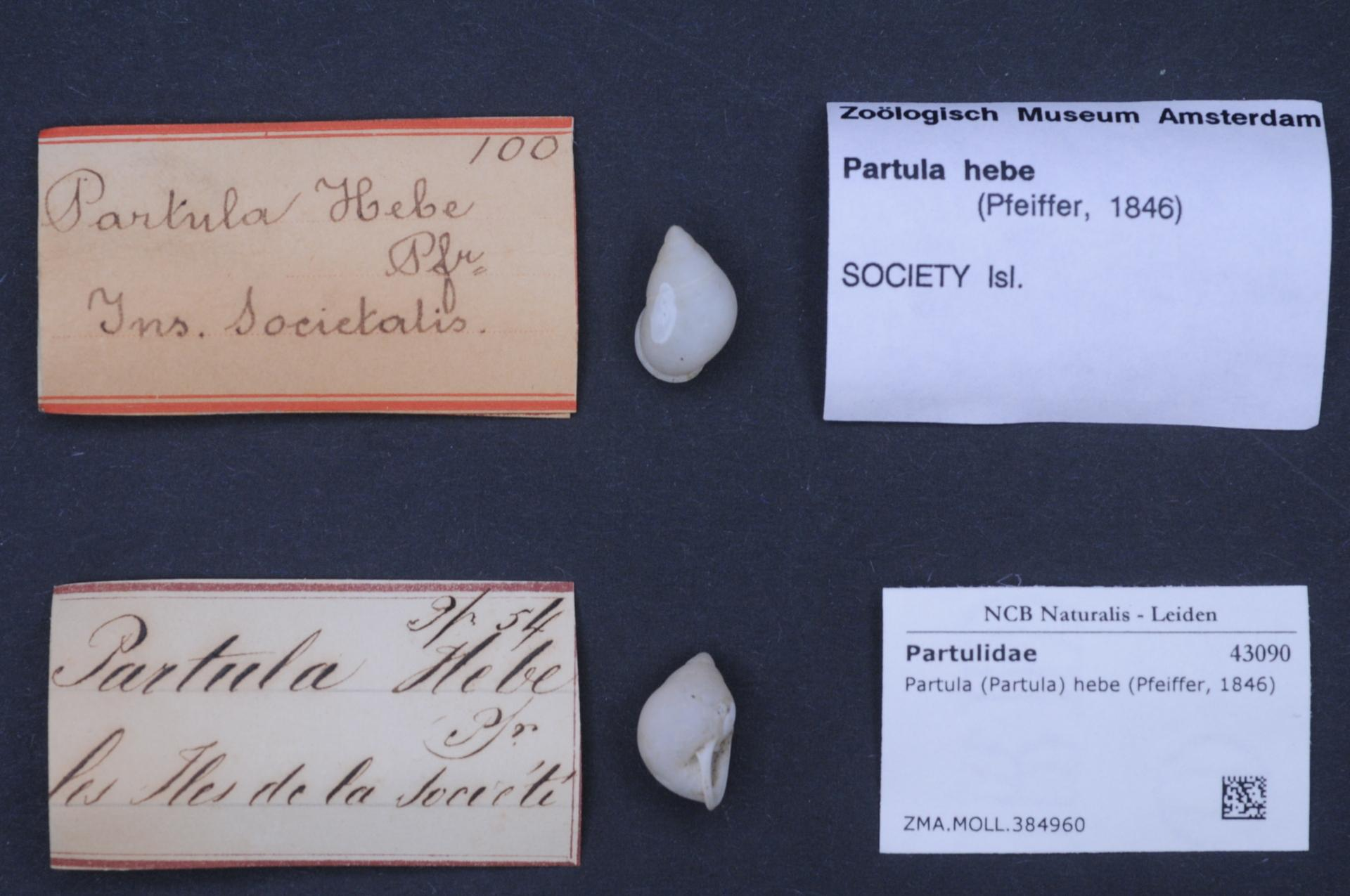

Conservation status
- Extinct in the Wild (IUCN 3.1)

Scientific classification
- Kingdom: Animalia
- Phylum: Mollusca
- Class: Gastropoda
- Order: Stylommatophora
- Family: Partulidae
- Genus: Partula
- Species: P. hebe

Binomial name
- Partula hebe Pfeiffer, 1846

= Partula hebe =

Species of gastropod

Partula hebe is a species of air-breathing tropical land snail, a terrestrial pulmonate gastropod mollusk in the family Partulidae. This species was endemic to Ra'iātea, French Polynesia. It is now extinct in the wild.
