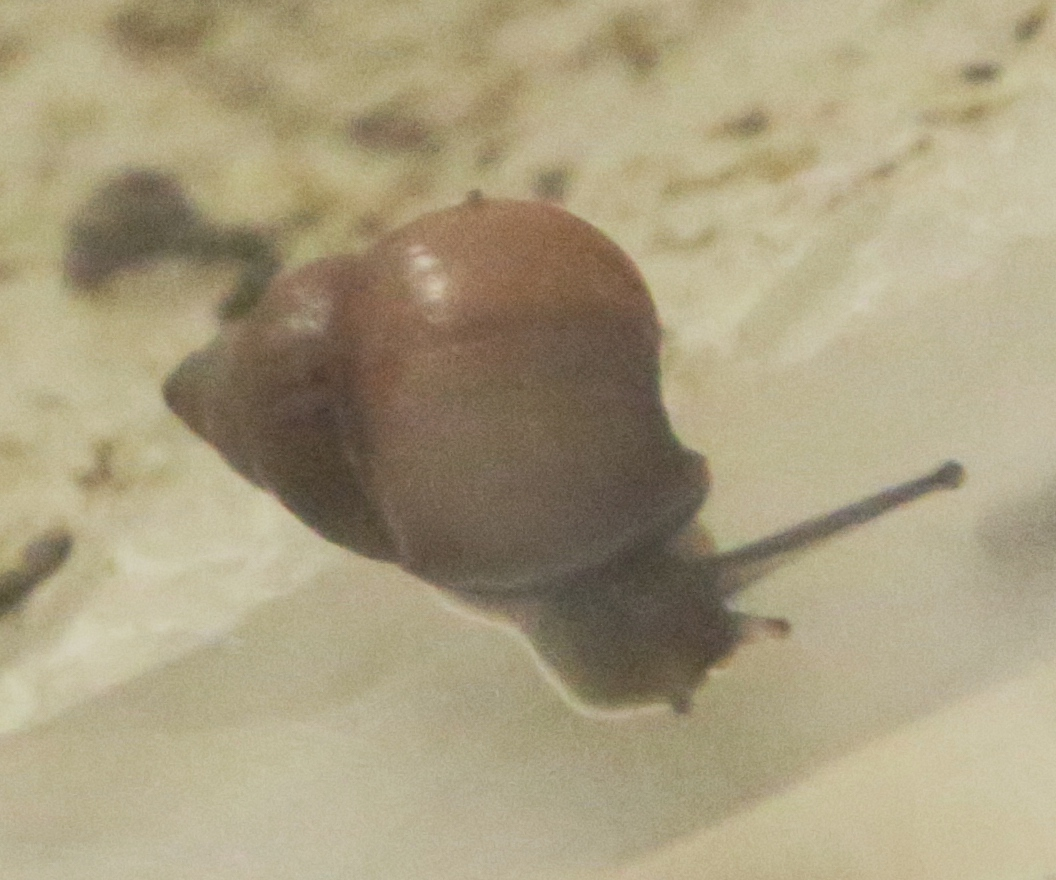
- Live Partula varia at Marwell Zoo.
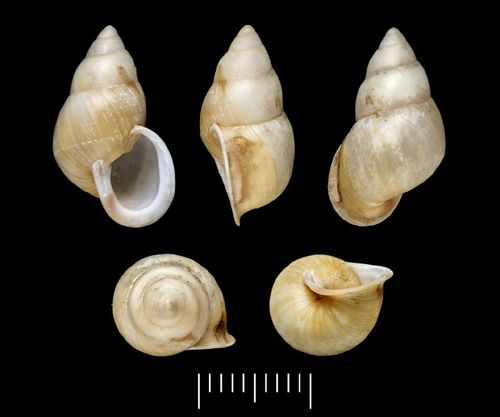
- Shell of Partula varia glutinosa.

Conservation status
- Extinct in the Wild (IUCN 3.1)

Scientific classification
- Kingdom: Animalia
- Phylum: Mollusca
- Class: Gastropoda
- Order: Stylommatophora
- Family: Partulidae
- Genus: Partula
- Species: P. varia

Binomial name
- Partula varia Broderip, 1832

= Partula varia =

Species of gastropod

Partula varia is a species of air-breathing tropical land snail, a terrestrial pulmonate gastropod mollusk in the family Partulidae. This species is endemic to Huahine, French Polynesia. It was extinct in the wild. In 2019 the species was reintroduced to the wild on Huahine.
