= Yoshio Kondo =

American scientist (1910–1990)

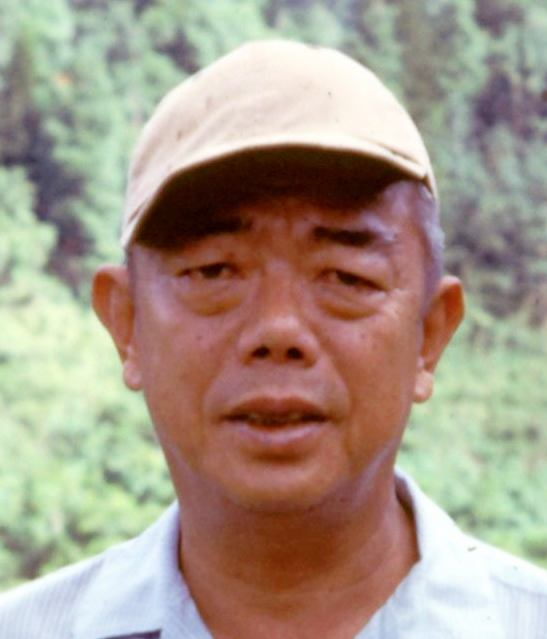
- Yoshio Kondo in 1967
- Born: 1910; Maui, Hawaii
- Died: 1990 (aged 79–80); Oahu, Hawaii
- Other name: Yoshi
- Education: Harvard University
- Children: Charles Kondo, PHD.
- Scientific career
- Fields: Biology; Malacology
- Institutions: Bernice P. Bishop Museum, Honolulu

Yoshio Kondo (1910, on Maui, Hawaii – 1990, on Oahu, Hawaii) was an American biologist and malacologist. He spent virtually his entire life in Hawaii, with the exception of a number of collecting expeditions, primarily to islands in the Pacific Ocean (including the Mangarevan Expedition in 1934). Kondo had been trained as an electrician and was the chief engineer aboard the Myojin Maru at the time the boat was chartered for Bishop Museum's Mangarevan Expedition. Dr Cooke, the leader of the expedition, had been impressed by Kondo's interest in land shells that he was later hired as Assistant Malacologist at the museum. Kondo later enrolled at University of Hawai'i and received his Bachelor of Arts degree with honors. He then studied at Harvard University, where he received a Ph.D. under the direction of William J. Clench in 1955. He was known to most people as "Yoshi".

Kondo spent his entire career, over 40 years, at the Bernice P. Bishop Museum in Honolulu. He was a Malacologist at Bishop Museum from 1948 to 1980. During most of that period, his official position was "Curator of Mollusks". His main research interests involved land snails in the families Achatinellidae and Partulidae, groups for which he was a major authority, although he did work with other mollusks as well.

He was succeeded by his son, Charles Kondo, PHD., and grandchildren: Douglas Kondo, MD; Erica Kondo, and Nick Kondo.
