= Polynesian tree snail =

Polynesian tree snail is a common name applied to a number of species of arboreal land snail.

- Partula affinis
- Partula arguta
- Partula atilis
- Partula aurantia
- Partula auriculata
- Partula bilineata
- Partula callifera
- Partula candida
- Partula cedista
- Partula citrina
- Partula clara
- Partula crassilabris
- Partula cuneata
- Partula cytherea
- Partula dentifera
- Partula dolichostoma
- Partula dolorosa
- Partula eremita
- Partula exigua
- Partula faba
- Partula filosa
- Partula formosa
- Partula fusca
- Partula garretti
- Partula hebe
- Partula hyalina
- Partula labrusca
- Partula leptochila
- Partula levilineata
- Partula levistriata
- Partula lugubris
- Partula lutea
- Partula mirabilis
- Partula mooreana
- Partula navigatoria
- Partula nodosa
- Partula ovalis
- Partula planilabrum
- Partula producta
- Partula protracta
- Partula radiata
- Partula remota
- Partula robusta
- Partula rosea
- Partula rustica
- Partula sagitta
- Partula suturalis
- Partula taeniata
- Partula thalia
- Partula tohiveana
- Partula tristis
- Partula turgida
- Partula umbilicata
- Partula varia
- Partula vittata
- Samoana annectens
- Samoana attenuata
- Samoana bellula
- Samoana burchi
- Samoana decussatula
- Samoana diaphana
- Samoana dryas
- Samoana ganymedes
- Samoana hamadryas
- Samoana inflata
- Samoana jackieburchi
- Samoana magdalinae
- Samoana margaritae
- Samoana oreas
- Samoana strigata
