= Eua expansa =

Broad Eua snail

Conservation status
- Endangered (IUCN 3.1)

Scientific classification
- Kingdom: Animalia
- Phylum: Mollusca
- Class: Gastropoda
- Order: Stylommatophora
- Family: Partulidae
- Genus: Eua
- Species: E. expansa

Binomial name
- Eua expansa (Pease, 1872)

Species of gastropod

Eua expansa is a species of tropical air-breathing land snail, a terrestrial pulmonate gastropod mollusc in the family Partulidae.

The following cladogram shows the phylogenic relations of Eua expansa:

- Partulidae
  - - Partula
    - Samoana
  - - Eua
      - - - Eua zebrina
          - Eua montana
        - Eua expansa
      - Eua globosa
