= Eua montana =

Conservation status
- Critically Endangered (IUCN 3.1)

Scientific classification
- Kingdom: Animalia
- Phylum: Mollusca
- Class: Gastropoda
- Order: Stylommatophora
- Family: Partulidae
- Genus: Eua
- Species: E. montana

Binomial name
- Eua montana (Cooke & Crampton, 1930)

Synonyms
- Eua mauga Cowie, 2019

Species of gastropod

Eua montana is a species of tropical air-breathing land snail, a terrestrial pulmonate gastropod mollusc in the family Partulidae.

The following is a cladogram showing the phylogenic relations of Eua montana:

- Partulidae
  - - Partula
    - Samoana
  - - Eua
      - - - Eua zebrina
          - Eua montana
        - Eua expansa
      - Eua globosa
