= Samoana thurstoni =

Conservation status
- Endangered (IUCN 3.1)

Scientific classification
- Kingdom: Animalia
- Phylum: Mollusca
- Class: Gastropoda
- Order: Stylommatophora
- Family: Partulidae
- Genus: Samoana
- Species: S. thurstoni

Binomial name
- Samoana thurstoni (Cooke & Crampton, 1930)

Species of gastropod

Samoana thurstoni is a species of tropical, air-breathing land snail, a terrestrial, pulmonate, gastropod mollusc in the family Partulidae. This species is endemic to American Samoa. It is threatened by habitat loss.
