= Samoana margaritae =

Conservation status
- Vulnerable (IUCN 3.1)

Scientific classification
- Kingdom: Animalia
- Phylum: Mollusca
- Class: Gastropoda
- Order: Stylommatophora
- Family: Partulidae
- Genus: Samoana
- Species: S. margaritae

Binomial name
- Samoana margaritae Crampton & Cooke, 1953

Species of gastropod

Samoana margaritae, common name the "Polynesian tree snail", is a species of tropical, air-breathing land snail, a terrestrial, pulmonate, gastropod mollusc in the family Partulidae. This species is endemic to Rapa, Austral Islands, French Polynesia.
