= List of non-marine molluscs of American Samoa =

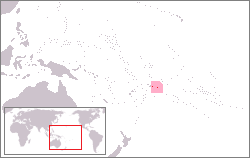
Location of American Samoa

The non-marine molluscs of American Samoa are a part of the fauna of American Samoa.

== Land gastropods ==
Partulidae

- Eua zebrina (Gould, 1847) – endemic
- Samoana abbreviata (Mousson, 1869) – Short Samoan tree snail – endemic
- Samoana conica – endemic
- Samoana thurstoni (Cooke & Crampton, 1930) – endemic

Zonitidae

- Trochomorpha apia (Hombron & Jacquinot, 1852) – endemic

== See also ==
- List of marine molluscs of American Samoa
- List of non-marine molluscs of the Cook Islands
- List of non-marine molluscs of Tonga
- List of non-marine molluscs of Wallis and Futuna
