= P. leptochila =

P. leptochila may refer to:

- Partula leptochila, an extinct snail
- Pterostylis leptochila, a terrestrial orchid
