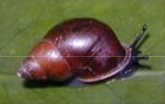
- Photographed on Mount Tohivea, Moorea

Conservation status
- Extinct in the Wild (IUCN 2.3)

Scientific classification
- Kingdom: Animalia
- Phylum: Mollusca
- Class: Gastropoda
- Order: Stylommatophora
- Family: Partulidae
- Genus: Partula
- Species: P. taeniata
- Subspecies: P. t. simulans

Trinomial name
- Partula taeniata simulans Pease, 1866

= Partula taeniata simulans =

Subspecies of snail

Partula taeniata simulans (often incorrectly spelled Partula taeniata sumulans) is a rare subspecies of Partula taeniata. The subspecies declined to one individual in 2010, and now has several hundred individuals surviving in captivity, which are being reintroduced.

== Description ==
Individuals can grow to be 17–18 mm (5/8–3/4 in) in length.
