= Eua globosa =

Fat Eua snail

Conservation status
- Critically endangered, possibly extinct (IUCN 3.1)

Scientific classification
- Kingdom: Animalia
- Phylum: Mollusca
- Class: Gastropoda
- Order: Stylommatophora
- Family: Partulidae
- Genus: Eua
- Species: E. globosa

Binomial name
- Eua globosa Pilsbry & Cooke, 1934

Species of gastropod

Eua globosa is a species of tropical air-breathing land snail, a terrestrial pulmonate gastropod mollusc in the family Partulidae. It is endemic to the island of 'Eua, Tonga.

Eua globosa is the type species of the genus Eua.

The following cladogram shows the phylogenic relations of Eua globosa:

- Partulidae
  - - Partula
    - Samoana
  - - Eua
      - - - Eua zebrina
          - Eua montana
        - Eua expansa
      - Eua globosa
