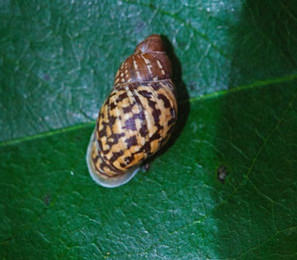

Conservation status
- Endangered (IUCN 3.1)

- Endangered (ESA)

Scientific classification
- Kingdom: Animalia
- Phylum: Mollusca
- Class: Gastropoda
- Order: Stylommatophora
- Family: Partulidae
- Genus: Eua
- Species: E. zebrina

Binomial name
- Eua zebrina (Gould, 1847)

Synonyms
- Partula actor Albers, 1850; Partula tryoni Hartman, 1885; Partula zebrina A. Gould, 1848

= Eua zebrina =

Striped Eua snail

Species of gastropod

Eua zebrina is a species of tropical air-breathing land snail, terrestrial pulmonate gastropod molluscs in the family Partulidae. This species is endemic to American Samoa.

A cladogram showing phylogenic relations of Eua zebrina:

- Partulidae
  - - Partula
    - Samoana
  - - Eua
      - - - Eua zebrina
          - Eua montana
        - Eua expansa
      - Eua globosa
