= Samoana annectens =

Huahine Samoana tree snail

Conservation status
- Data Deficient (IUCN 3.1)

Scientific classification
- Kingdom: Animalia
- Phylum: Mollusca
- Class: Gastropoda
- Order: Stylommatophora
- Family: Partulidae
- Genus: Samoana
- Species: S. annectens

Binomial name
- Samoana annectens Pease, 1864

Species of gastropod

Samoana annectens is a species of tropical, air-breathing land snail, a terrestrial, pulmonate, gastropod mollusc in the family Partulidae. This is one of many species known as the "Polynesian tree snail"; it is endemic to Huahine, French Polynesia.
