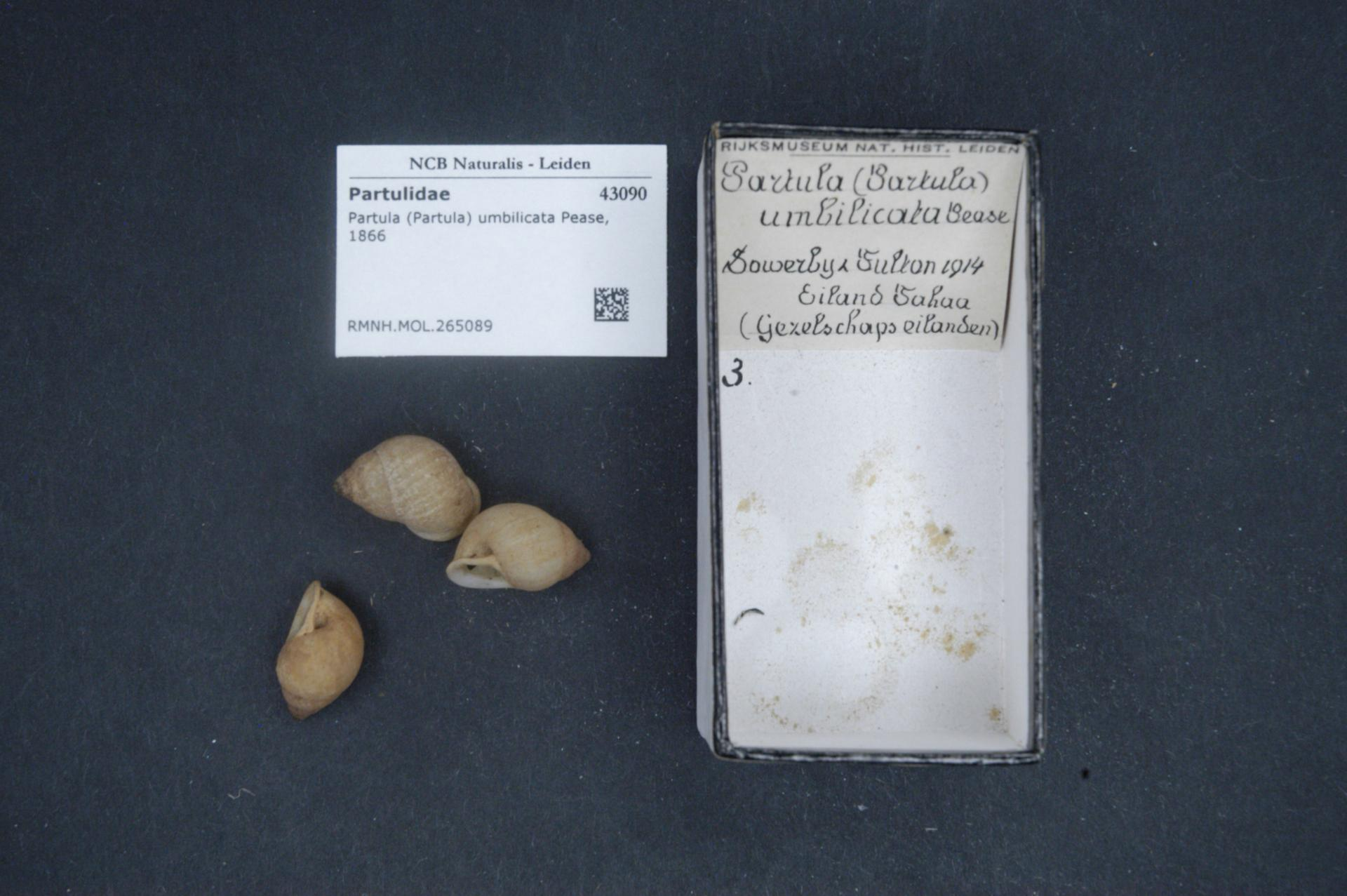

Conservation status
- Extinct (IUCN 3.1)

Scientific classification
- Kingdom: Animalia
- Phylum: Mollusca
- Class: Gastropoda
- Order: Stylommatophora
- Family: Partulidae
- Genus: Partula
- Species: †P. umbilicata

Binomial name
- †Partula umbilicata Pease, 1866

= Partula umbilicata =

Species of gastropod

†Partula umbilicata was a species of air-breathing tropical land snail, a terrestrial pulmonate gastropod mollusk in the family Partulidae. This species was endemic to Tahaa, French Polynesia. It is now extinct.
