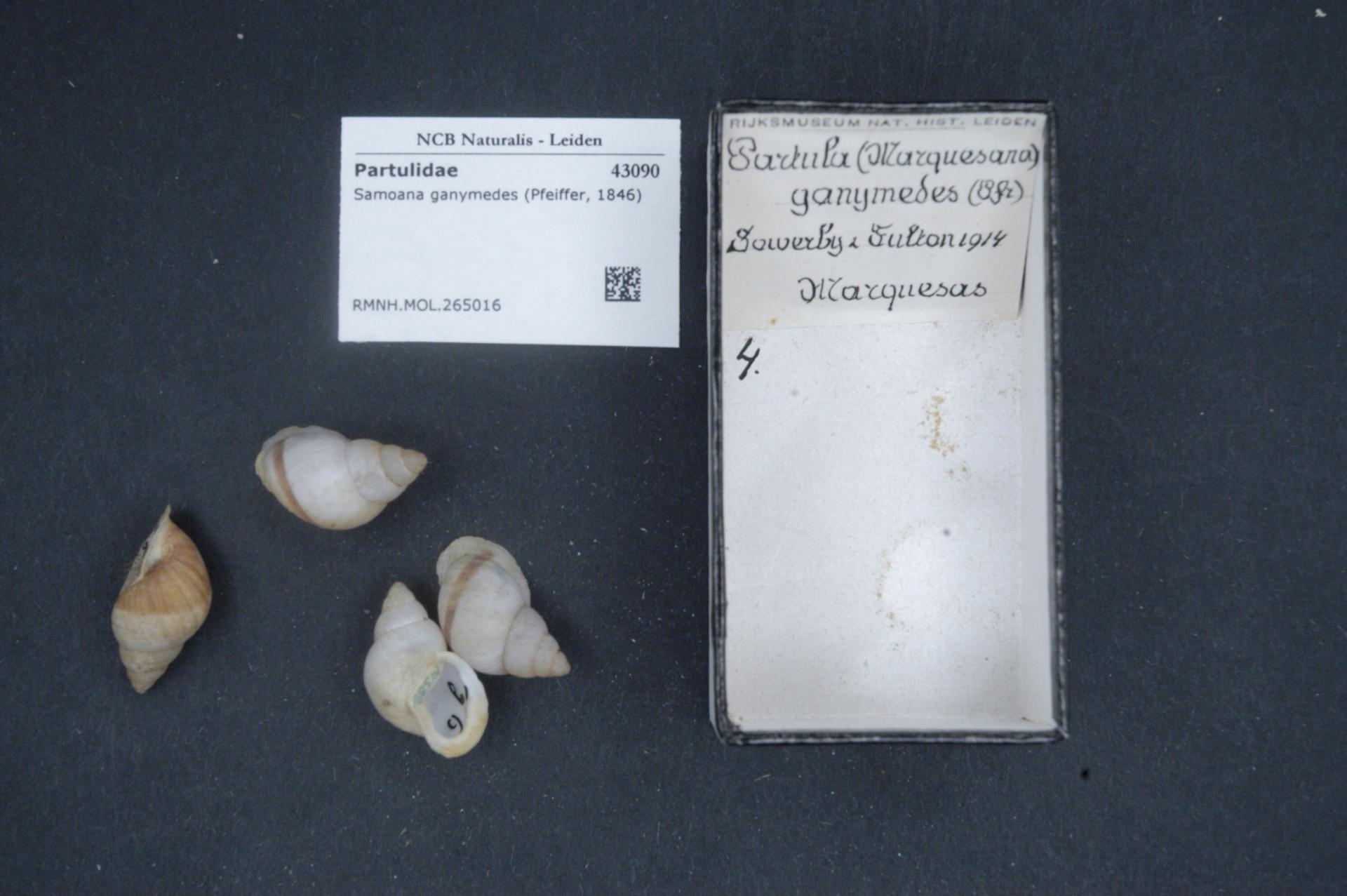
- Samoana ganymedes, also called the Polynesian tree snail

Conservation status
- Data Deficient (IUCN 3.1)

Scientific classification
- Kingdom: Animalia
- Phylum: Mollusca
- Class: Gastropoda
- Order: Stylommatophora
- Family: Partulidae
- Genus: Samoana
- Species: S. ganymedes

Binomial name
- Samoana ganymedes Pfeiffer, 1846

= Samoana ganymedes =

Species of gastropod

Samoana ganymedes, common name the "Polynesian tree snail", is a species of tropical, air-breathing land snail, a terrestrial, pulmonate, gastropod mollusc in the family Partulidae. This species is endemic to Tahuata and Hiva Oa, Marquesas Islands, French Polynesia.
