= Clavus nodulosa =

Scientific classification
- Kingdom: Animalia
- Phylum: Mollusca
- Class: Gastropoda
- Subclass: Caenogastropoda
- Order: Neogastropoda
- Superfamily: Conoidea
- Family: Drilliidae
- Genus: Clavus
- Species: C. nodulosa

Binomial name
- Clavus nodulosa (Pease, 1863)

Synonyms
- Drillia nodulosa Pease, 1863

Species of gastropod

Clavus nodulosa is a species of sea snail, a marine gastropod mollusk in the family Drilliidae.

== Description ==
The shell grows to a length of 11 mm; its diameter is 4.5 mm.

(Original description) The shell is pyramidally oblong. It contains eight whorls. These are concavely depressed above and contain about ten longitudinally nodose ribs. The body whorl is encircled by a row of tuberculous nodules, in continuation of the longitudinal ribs. The aperture is oval. The sinus is round and deep. The short siphonal canal is wide. The color of the shell is reddish brown. The ribs and the base of the columella are whitish.

== Distribution ==
This species occurs in the demersal zone of the tropical Pacific Ocean and in the Indian Ocean along Réunion.
