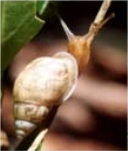
- Samoana attenuata from Mount Tohiea Belvedere on Moorea

Conservation status
- Critically Endangered (IUCN 3.1)

Scientific classification
- Kingdom: Animalia
- Phylum: Mollusca
- Class: Gastropoda
- Order: Stylommatophora
- Family: Partulidae
- Genus: Samoana
- Species: S. attenuata

Binomial name
- Samoana attenuata (Pease, 1864)

Synonyms
- Partula attenuata Samoana solitaria

= Samoana attenuata =

- Samoana attenuata from Haapupuni on Tahiti

Species of gastropod

Samoana attenuata is a species of air-breathing tropical land snail, a terrestrial pulmonate gastropod mollusc in the family Partulidae. This species is endemic to French Polynesia.

== Conservation ==
The slender snail was widespread in Society Islands. But in the late 1980s, carnivorous Euglandina rosea was introduced into Society Islands and this led to Samoana attenuata snails disappearing quickly. Populations on Raiatea were thought to be extinct until 2006.

Presently, the species is living on Raiatea, Tahiti, and Moorea. The species is currently believed to be extirpated from Bora Bora.

The species was one of few species of Partulidae which was native in Bora Bora, the only other being Partula lutea.
