= Gibberula sandwicensis =

Scientific classification
- Kingdom: Animalia
- Phylum: Mollusca
- Class: Gastropoda
- Subclass: Caenogastropoda
- Order: Neogastropoda
- Family: Cystiscidae
- Subfamily: Cystiscinae
- Genus: Gibberula
- Species: G. sandwicensis

Binomial name
- Gibberula sandwicensis (Pease, 1860)

Synonyms
- Marginella pygmaea Garret; Marginella sandwicensis Pease, 1860

Species of gastropod

Gibberula sandwicensis is a species of sea snail, a marine gastropod mollusk in the family Marginellidae, the margin snails.

The spelling with the epithet "sandwichensis" is a misspelling.

== Distribution ==
This species is distributed in the Indian Ocean along Madagascar
