= Gibberula debilis =

Scientific classification
- Kingdom: Animalia
- Phylum: Mollusca
- Class: Gastropoda
- Subclass: Caenogastropoda
- Order: Neogastropoda
- Family: Cystiscidae
- Subfamily: Cystiscinae
- Genus: Gibberula
- Species: G. debilis

Binomial name
- Gibberula debilis (Pease, 1871)

Synonyms
- Marginella debilis Pease, 1871; Marginella oryza Pease, 1860

Species of gastropod

Gibberula debilis is a species of sea snail, a marine gastropod mollusk, in the family Cystiscidae.
