= Daphnella curta =

Scientific classification
- Kingdom: Animalia
- Phylum: Mollusca
- Class: Gastropoda
- Subclass: Caenogastropoda
- Order: Neogastropoda
- Superfamily: Conoidea
- Family: Raphitomidae
- Genus: Daphnella
- Species: D. curta

Binomial name
- Daphnella curta Pease, 1868

Species of gastropod

Daphnella curta is a species of sea snail, a marine gastropod mollusk in the family Raphitomidae.

This is a taxon inquirendum.

== Description ==
The length of the shell attains 4.5 mm, its diameter 2 mm.

(Original description) The abbreviate, white shell is ovate. The short spire is transversely, regularly finely granulosely ridged. Longitudinally it is indistinctly striate. The aperture is rather open and measures about one-half the length of the shell.

== Distribution ==
This marine species occurs off the Tuamotu Islands
