= Samoana diaphana =

- Samoana diaphana from Mount Pihaaiateta on Tahiti.

Conservation status
- Endangered (IUCN 3.1)

Scientific classification
- Kingdom: Animalia
- Phylum: Mollusca
- Class: Gastropoda
- Order: Stylommatophora
- Family: Partulidae
- Genus: Samoana
- Species: S. diaphana

Binomial name
- Samoana diaphana Crampton & Cooke, 1953

Species of gastropod

Samoana diaphana, one of several species also known as the Moorean viviparous tree snail or the Polynesian tree snail, is a species of tropical, air-breathing land snail, a terrestrial, pulmonate, gastropod mollusc in the family Partulidae. This species is endemic to French Polynesia.
