= Partula cytherea =

Conservation status
- Critically endangered, possibly extinct (IUCN 3.1)

Scientific classification
- Kingdom: Animalia
- Phylum: Mollusca
- Class: Gastropoda
- Order: Stylommatophora
- Family: Partulidae
- Genus: Partula
- Species: P. cytherea

Binomial name
- Partula cytherea Cooke & Crampton, 1930

Species of gastropod

Partula cytherea is an extremely rare species of air-breathing tropical land snail, a terrestrial pulmonate gastropod mollusk in the family Partulidae. This species was endemic to Tahiti, French Polynesia.

The species was feared to be extinct, but an isolated population was located on Mt. Marau in 2005.
