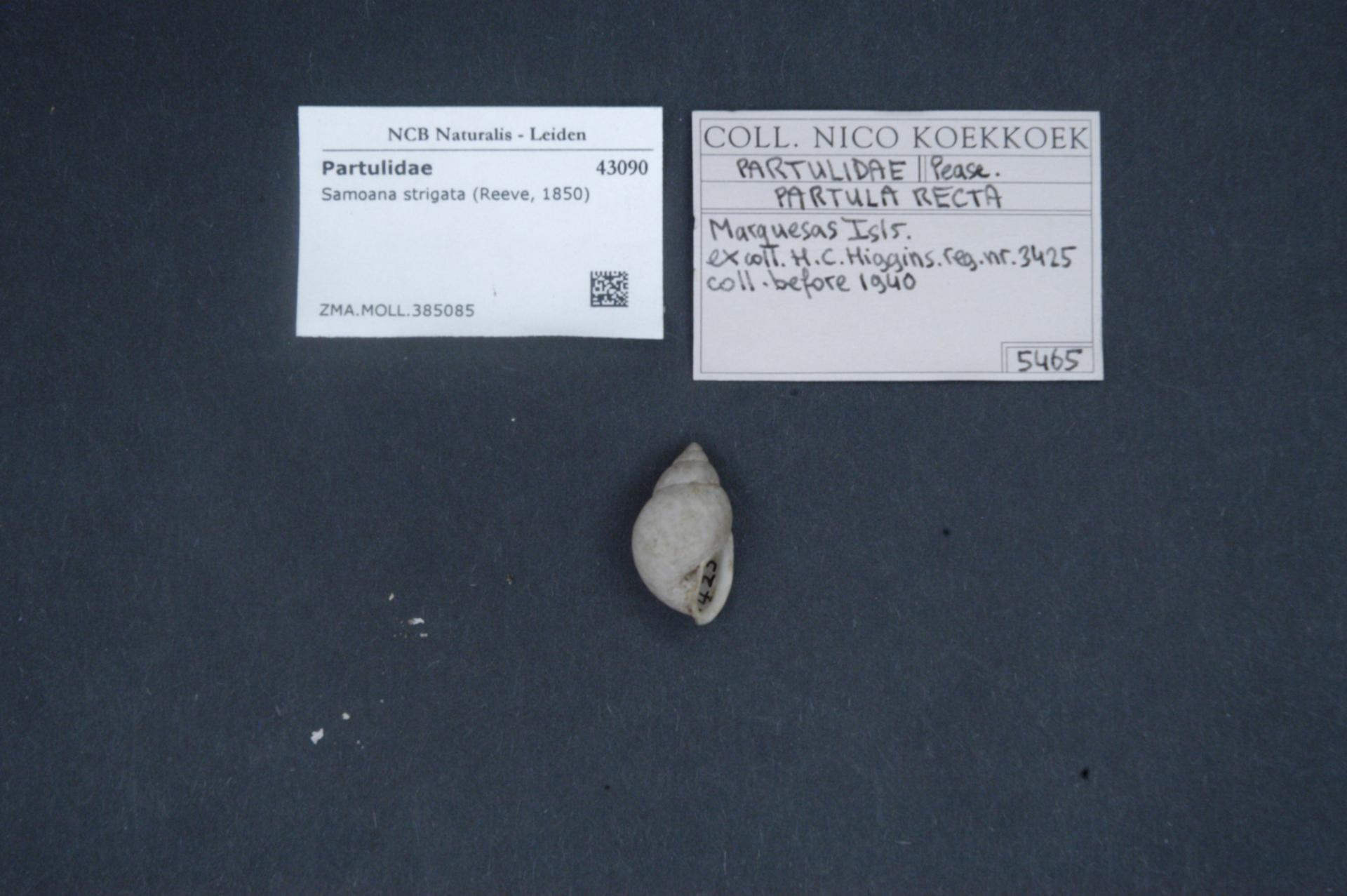

Conservation status
- Endangered (IUCN 3.1)

Scientific classification
- Kingdom: Animalia
- Phylum: Mollusca
- Class: Gastropoda
- Order: Stylommatophora
- Family: Partulidae
- Genus: Samoana
- Species: S. gonochila

Binomial name
- Samoana gonochila (L. Pfeiffer, 1847)

Synonyms
- Bulimus gonochilus Pfeiffer, 1847; Partula recta Pease, 1868; Partula repanda Pfeiffer, 1855; Samoana strigata Pease, 1868

= Samoana gonochila =

Species of gastropod

Samoana gonochila, common name the "Polynesian tree snail", is a species of tropical, air-breathing land snail, a terrestrial, pulmonate, gastropod mollusc in the family Partulidae.

== Distribution ==
This species is endemic to Nuku Hiva and Ua Huka, Marquesas Islands, French Polynesia.
