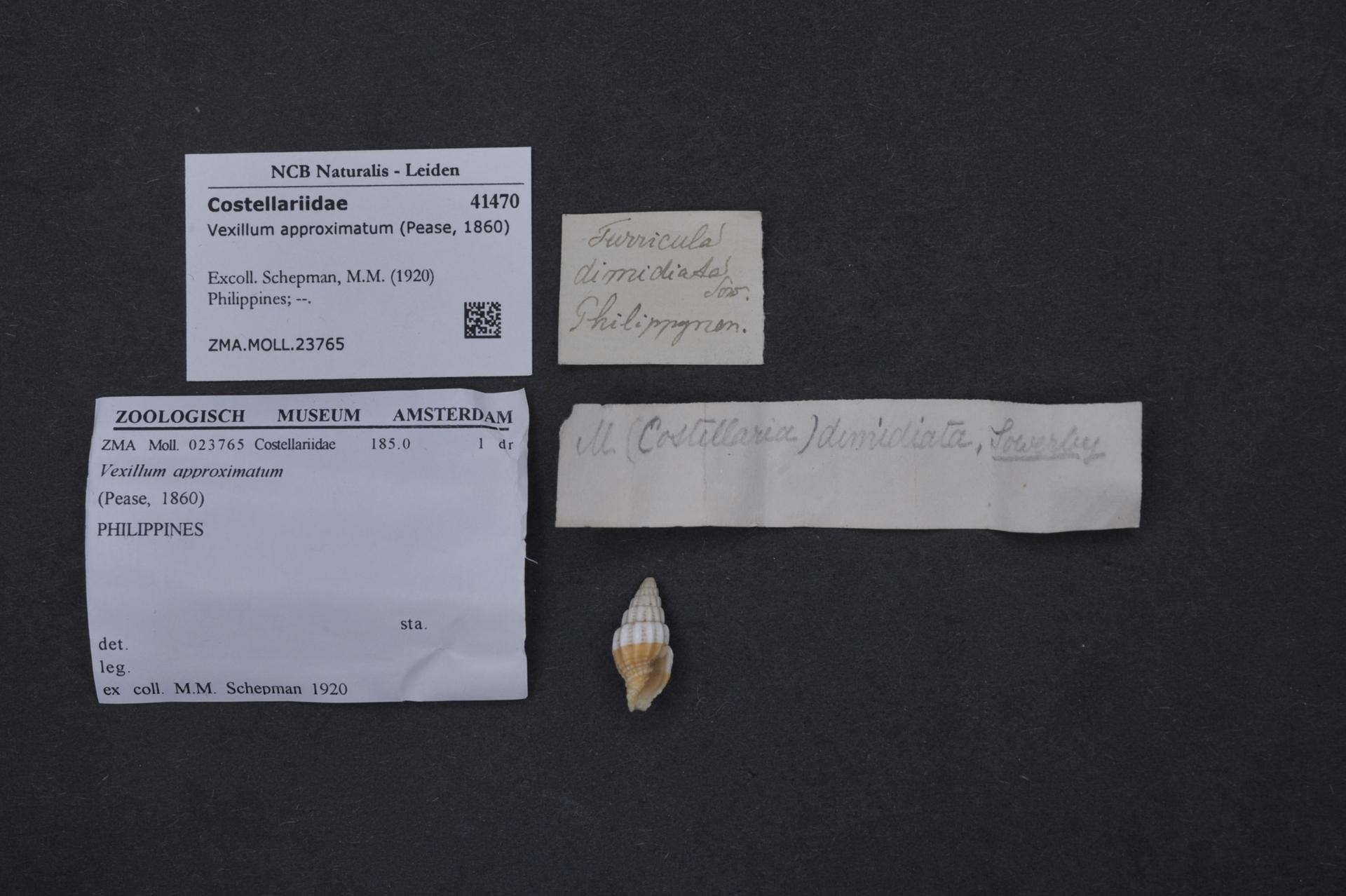

Scientific classification
- Kingdom: Animalia
- Phylum: Mollusca
- Class: Gastropoda
- Subclass: Caenogastropoda
- Order: Neogastropoda
- Superfamily: Turbinelloidea
- Family: Costellariidae
- Genus: Vexillum
- Species: V. approximatum

Binomial name
- Vexillum approximatum (Pease, 1860)

Synonyms
- Mitra dimidiata Sowerby, 1870; Turricula approximata Pease, 1860; Vexillum (Pusia) approximatum (Pease, 1860); Vexillum xenum Pilsbry, 1920

= Vexillum approximatum =

Species of gastropod

Vexillum approximatum is a species of small sea snail, marine gastropod mollusk in the family Costellariidae, the ribbed miters.

== Description ==
The ovate shell is turreted. The whorls are convexly angulated at the sutures, longitudinally ribbed and crossed by impressed striae. The interstices are punctured. The aperture is striated within. The columella is four-plaited. The color of the shell is white, banded and blotched irregularly with chestnut-brown.

== Distribution ==
This marine species occurs off the Philippines and Hawaii.

Fossils have been found in early Miocene strata on Enewetak Atoll, Marshall Islands.
