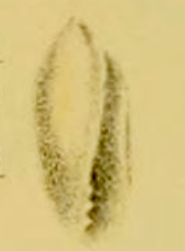
- Original drawing of a shell of Volvarina paumotensis (holotype)

Scientific classification
- Kingdom: Animalia
- Phylum: Mollusca
- Class: Gastropoda
- Subclass: Caenogastropoda
- Order: Neogastropoda
- Family: Marginellidae
- Subfamily: Marginellinae
- Genus: Volvarina
- Species: V. paumotensis

Binomial name
- Volvarina paumotensis (Pease, 1868)

Synonyms
- Marginella paumotensis Pease, 1868 (original combination)

= Volvarina paumotensis =

Species of gastropod

Volvarina paumotensis is a species of sea snail, a marine gastropod mollusk in the family Marginellidae, the margin snails.

== Description ==
The length of the shell attains 5.5 mm, its diameter 2.5 mm.

(Original description) The oblong shell is somewhat cylindrical, polished and smooth. It is white with three faint yellowish bands. The spire is very short. The outer lip is inflexed at the middle and smooth within. The columella is laminately callous at the base and has three plaits.

== Distribution ==
This marine species occurs off the Tuamotu Islands, Polynesia.
