= Samoana bellula =

Conservation status
- Critically Endangered (IUCN 3.1)

Scientific classification
- Kingdom: Animalia
- Phylum: Mollusca
- Class: Gastropoda
- Order: Stylommatophora
- Family: Partulidae
- Genus: Samoana
- Species: S. bellula

Binomial name
- Samoana bellula Hartman

Species of gastropod

Samoana bellula, one of several species commonly known as "Polynesian tree snails", is a species of tropical, air-breathing land snail, a terrestrial, pulmonate, gastropod mollusc in the family Partulidae. This species is endemic to Ua Pou, Marquesas Islands, French Polynesia.
