= Samoana dryas =

Conservation status
- Critically Endangered (IUCN 3.1)

Scientific classification
- Kingdom: Animalia
- Phylum: Mollusca
- Class: Gastropoda
- Order: Stylommatophora
- Family: Partulidae
- Genus: Samoana
- Species: S. dryas

Binomial name
- Samoana dryas Crampton & Cooke, 1953

Synonyms
- Samoana hamadryas Samoana oreas Partula oreas

Species of gastropod

Samoana dryas, common name the Raivavae tree snail, is a species of tropical, air-breathing land snail, a terrestrial, pulmonate, gastropod mollusc in the family Partulidae. This species is endemic to Raivavae, Austral Islands, French Polynesia.
