= Samoana cramptoni =

Conservation status
- Critically endangered, possibly extinct (IUCN 3.1)

Scientific classification
- Kingdom: Animalia
- Phylum: Mollusca
- Class: Gastropoda
- Order: Stylommatophora
- Family: Partulidae
- Genus: Samoana
- Species: S. cramptoni

Binomial name
- Samoana cramptoni Pilsbry & Cooke, 1934

Species of gastropod

Samoana cramptoni is a species of tropical, air-breathing land snail, a terrestrial, pulmonate, gastropod mollusc in the family Partulidae. It is endemic to the island of ʻEua, Tonga.
