= Samoana decussatula =

Conservation status
- Critically Endangered (IUCN 3.1)

Scientific classification
- Kingdom: Animalia
- Phylum: Mollusca
- Class: Gastropoda
- Order: Stylommatophora
- Family: Partulidae
- Genus: Samoana
- Species: S. decussatula

Binomial name
- Samoana decussatula Pfeiffer

Species of gastropod

Samoana decussatula (Pfeiffer, 1850)

Samoana decussatula, common name the "Polynesian tree snail", is a species of tropical, air-breathing land snail, a terrestrial, pulmonate, gastropod mollusc in the family Partulidae. This species is endemic to Hiva Oa, Marquesas Islands, French Polynesia. It has also been recorded from the neighbouring island of Tahuata, but its presence there has not been confirmed.
