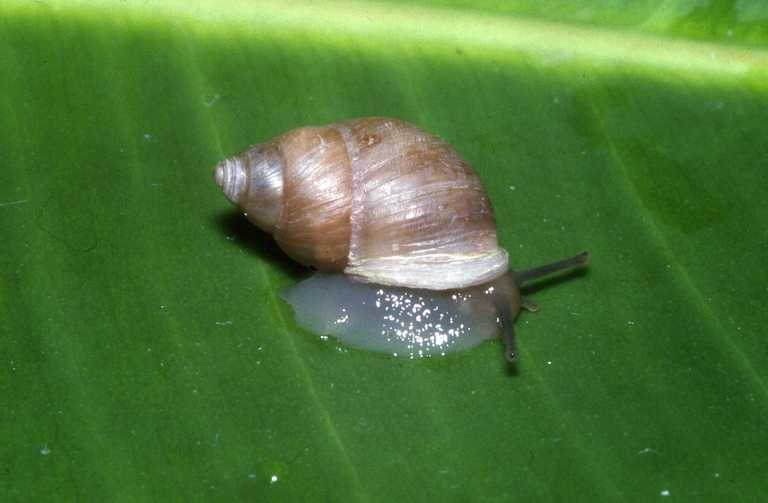
- In captivity
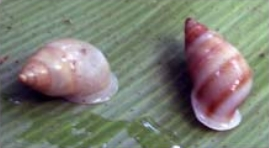
- In the wild, Moruu Valley

Conservation status
- Extinct in the Wild (IUCN 2.3)

Scientific classification
- Kingdom: Animalia
- Phylum: Mollusca
- Class: Gastropoda
- Order: Stylommatophora
- Family: Partulidae
- Genus: Partula
- Species: P. taeniata
- Subspecies: P. t. nucleola

Trinomial name
- Partula taeniata nucleola (Garrett, 1884)

= Partula taeniata nucleola =

Subspecies of mollusc

Partula taeniata nucleola is a subspecies of Partula taeniata endemic to northwestern Moʻorea in French Polynesia. It was estimated that it would go extinct in 1986 or 1987 if no conservation actions were taken. As of 2021, it had one wild population (in Moruu Valley) and was being released as part of a captive-breeding program. Wild individuals from Faatoai Valley have also been genotyped.

It is considered a synonym of Partula nucleola Garrett, 1884, itself a synonym of the accepted name Partula taeniata (Mörch, 1850).
