= Partula atilis =

Conservation status
- Extinct (IUCN 3.1)

Scientific classification
- Kingdom: Animalia
- Phylum: Mollusca
- Class: Gastropoda
- Order: Stylommatophora
- Family: Partulidae
- Genus: Partula
- Species: †P. atilis

Binomial name
- †Partula atilis Crampton, 1956

Species of gastropod

Partula atilis was a species of air-breathing tropical land snail, a terrestrial pulmonate gastropod mollusk in the family Partulidae. This species was endemic to Raʻiātea, French Polynesia, but has not been seen since the 1980s and is believed to have become extinct around 1991–1992 due to predation by the introduced rosy wolf snail (Euglandina rosea). It has been listed as extinct on the International Union for the Conservation of Nature's Red List since 1994.
