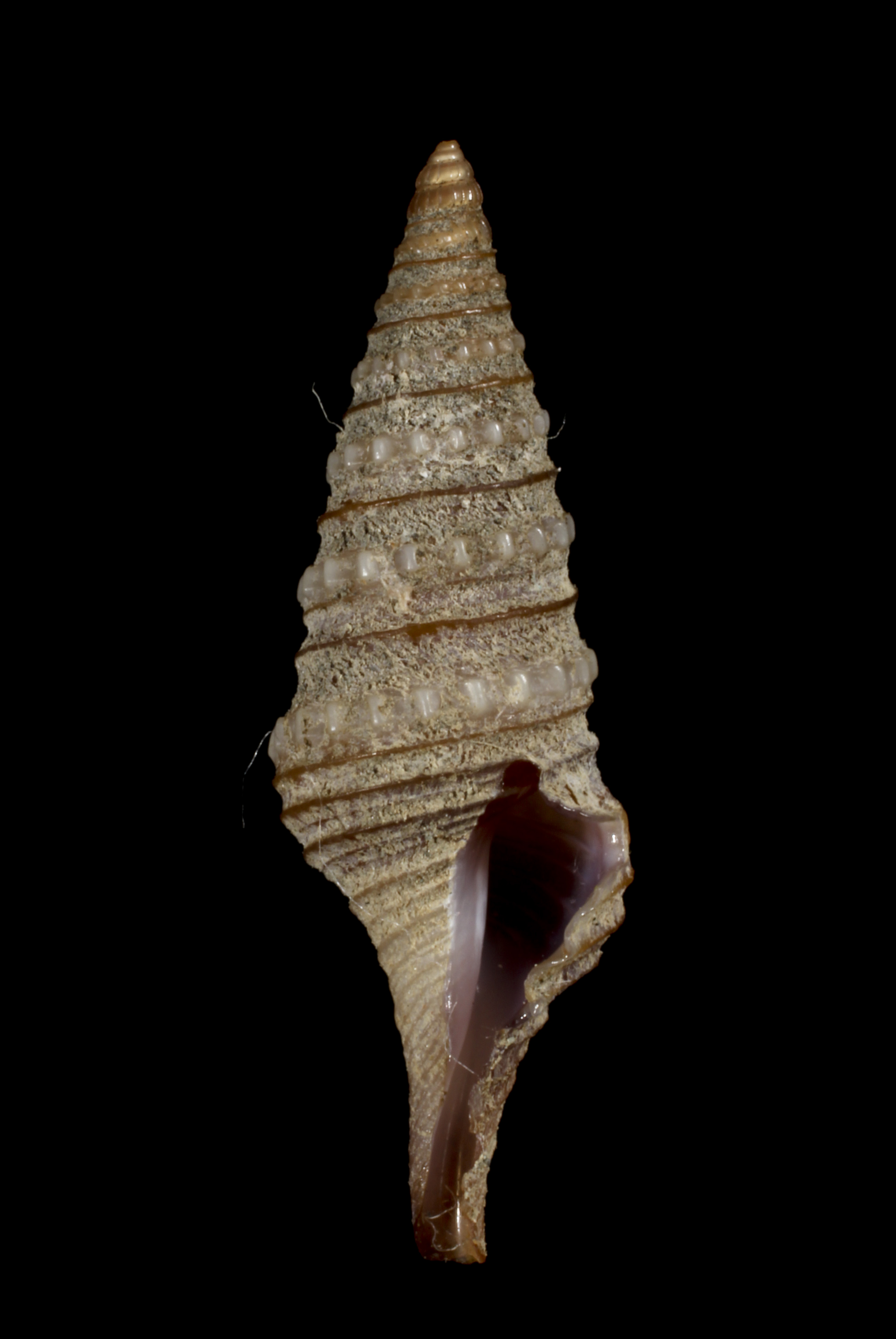
- Eugemmula monilifera shell

Scientific classification
- Kingdom: Animalia
- Phylum: Mollusca
- Class: Gastropoda
- Subclass: Caenogastropoda
- Order: Neogastropoda
- Superfamily: Conoidea
- Family: Turridae
- Genus: Eugemmula
- Species: E. monilifera

Binomial name
- Eugemmula monilifera (Pease, 1860)

Synonyms
- Gemmula monilifera (Pease, 1861); Gemmula (Gemmula) monilifera (Pease, 1861); Pleurotoma (Gemmula) monilifera (Pease, 1861); Turris aelomitra (Dall, 1952) (misidentification); Turris monilifera Pease, 1860; Turritella monilifera (Pease, 1861)

= Eugemmula monilifera =

Species of gastropod

Eugemmula monilifera is a species of sea snail, a marine gastropod mollusk in the family Turridae, the turrids.

== Description ==
The length of the shell varies between 10 mm and 30 mm.

(Original description) The shell is fusiform, turreted, and light brown. Its numerous whorls are encircled by a row of semitransparent, slightly oblong tubercles, disposed in a somewhat imbricated manner. A prominent keel lies between these rows, with a lighter one just below them. The interstices are concave, ornamented with raised striae, and crossed by oblique lines. The body whorl is encircled by raised striae, which are most prominent on its upper part. The aperture is ovate, and the siphonal canal is rather long and slightly recurved.

== Distribution ==
This marine species occurs in the Red Sea, in the Indian Ocean off Durban, South Africa; off Hawaii; off Papua New Guinea and Western Australia
