= Sphendone =

Scientific classification
- Kingdom: Animalia
- Phylum: Mollusca
- Class: Gastropoda
- Order: Stylommatophora
- Family: Partulidae
- Genus: Sphendone
- Species: S. insolita

Binomial name
- Sphendone insolita J. Slapcinsky & F. Kraus

Genus of gastropods

Sphendone insolita, common name the Palau rock snail, is a species of air-breathing tropical land snail, a terrestrial pulmonate gastropod in the family Partulidae. This species is endemic to Palau.

== Taxonomy and naming ==
John Slapcinsky and Fred Kraus described a new species from southern Ngeruktabel Island and nearby Mecherchar, which they deem sufficiently different from all other Partulids to merit being placed in an entirely new genus. This species is named Sphendone insolita, where Sphendone means a sling missile in Greek, a reference to the bullet-shape of the shells of the snails, and insolita means 'unusual' in Latin, in reference to the shape and ecological habits of the snail, both of which are unusual for a Partulid.
