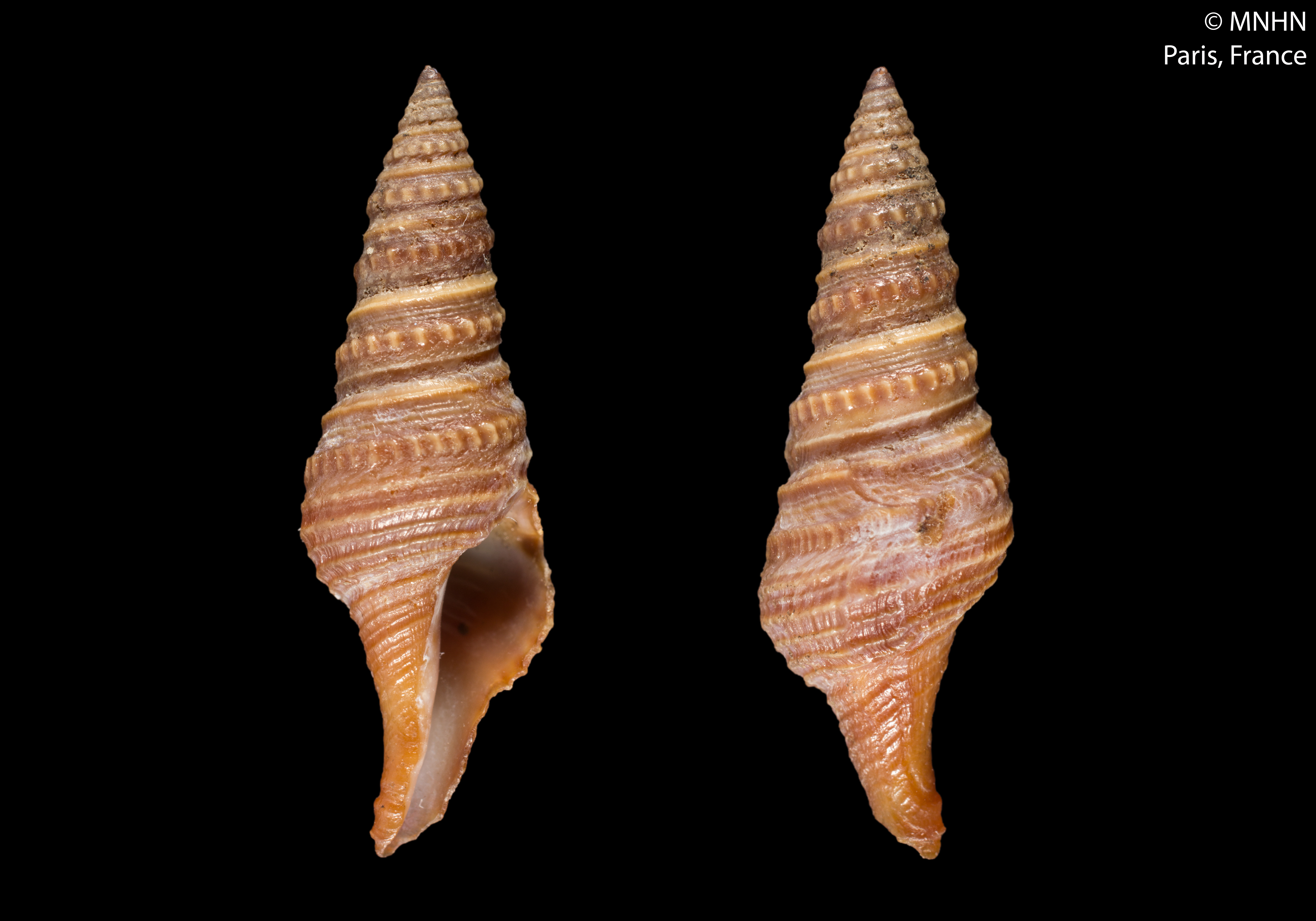
- Shell of Eugemmula hombroni (holotype at MNHN, Paris)

Scientific classification
- Kingdom: Animalia
- Phylum: Mollusca
- Class: Gastropoda
- Subclass: Caenogastropoda
- Order: Neogastropoda
- Superfamily: Conoidea
- Family: Turridae
- Genus: Eugemmula
- Species: E. hombroni

Binomial name
- Eugemmula hombroni Hedley, 1922

Synonyms
- Pleurotoma (Gemmula) padangensis Thiele, 1925; Pleurotoma (Gemmula) fusca Hombron & Jacquinot, 1853; Pleurotoma fusca Hombron & Jacquinot, 1848 (invalid: junior homonym of Pleurotoma fusca C.B. Adams, 1845; Gemmula hombroni is a replacement name)

= Eugemmula hombroni =

Species of gastropod

Eugemmula hombroni is a species of sea snail, a marine gastropod mollusk in the family Turridae, the turrids.

== Description ==
The length of the shell varies between 16 mm and 25 mm. Its a non-broadcast spawner and their lifecycle does not include trocophore stage.

== Distribution ==
This marine species occurs in the Indo-west Pacific, from Andaman Islands to Japan; also off Australia (Northern Territory, Queensland, Western Australia)
