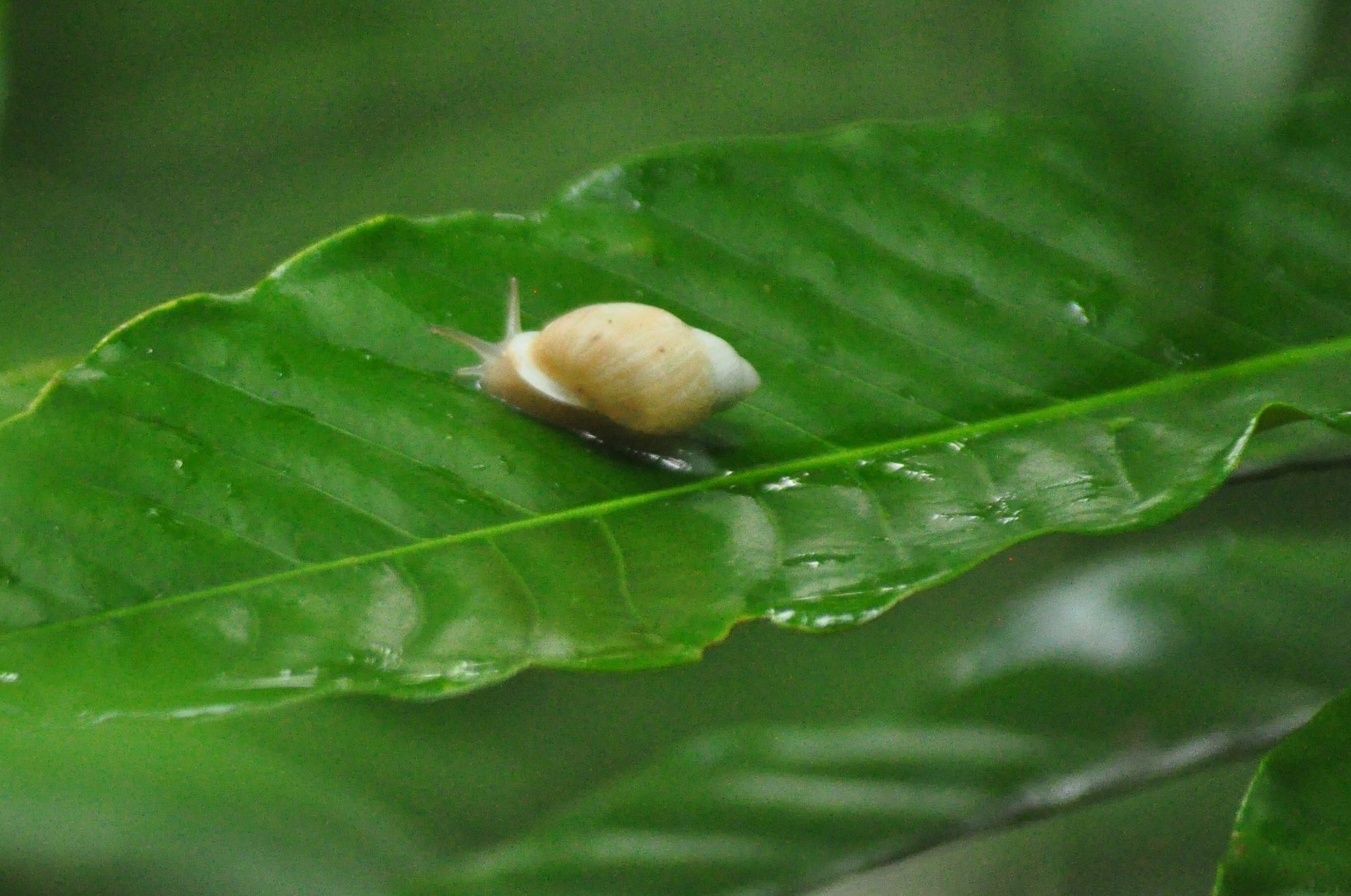

Conservation status
- Critically Endangered (IUCN 3.1)

Scientific classification
- Kingdom: Animalia
- Phylum: Mollusca
- Class: Gastropoda
- Order: Stylommatophora
- Infraorder: Pupilloidei
- Superfamily: Pupilloidea
- Family: Partulidae
- Genus: Samoana
- Species: S. abbreviata

Binomial name
- Samoana abbreviata (Mousson, 1869)

Synonyms
- Partula abbreviata Mousson, 1869

= Samoana abbreviata =

Species of gastropod

Samoana abbreviata, the short Samoan tree snail, is a species of tropical, air-breathing, land snail, a terrestrial, pulmonate, gastropod mollusk in the family Partulidae.

== Description ==
The shell of Samoana abbreviata reaches up to 22.6 mm in length, with a height of up to 21 mm and a width of 14 mm. It is dextral and generally yellowish-green in coloration.

== Taxonomy ==
Samoana abbreviata was originally described as Partula abbreviata by Albert Mousson in 1869. It was subsequently transferred to the genus Samoana, and Partula abbreviata is now treated as its original combination.

== Distribution ==
Samoana abbreviata is endemic to the island of Tutuila in American Samoa, where it occurs at elevations between 150 and 430 m. Living populations have been recorded from Alava–Maugaloa Ridge, Faiga Ridge, the Vatia Powerline Trail, Toa Ridge, and Polauta Ridge. Empty shells have also been found on Maugaloa Ridge, Pagatatua Ridge, and Levaga Ridge, indicating a historically broader distribution. The species has an estimated area of occupancy of less than 5 km².

== Conservation ==
Samoana abbreviata was not observed alive between 1940 and 1998, leading several authors to consider it possibly extinct. Alan Solem (1975) and Stephen E. Miller (1993) both regarded the species as tentatively extinct. In 1994, the United States Fish and Wildlife Service included the species as a candidate for listing under the Endangered Species Act, although it was considered probably extinct. The International Union for Conservation of Nature subsequently classified it as Data Deficient in 1996 due to insufficient information on its status.

During surveys conducted in 1998, researchers rediscovered living populations on Tutuila, recording 15 live individuals across Alava–Maugaloa Ridge, Faiga Ridge, the Vatia Powerline Trail, Toa Ridge, and Polauta Ridge. Empty shells were also found at several additional localities. The species was the rarest of the three partulid tree snails recorded on Tutuila and was considered to persist in extremely low numbers, indicating that it remained highly endangered despite its rediscovery.
