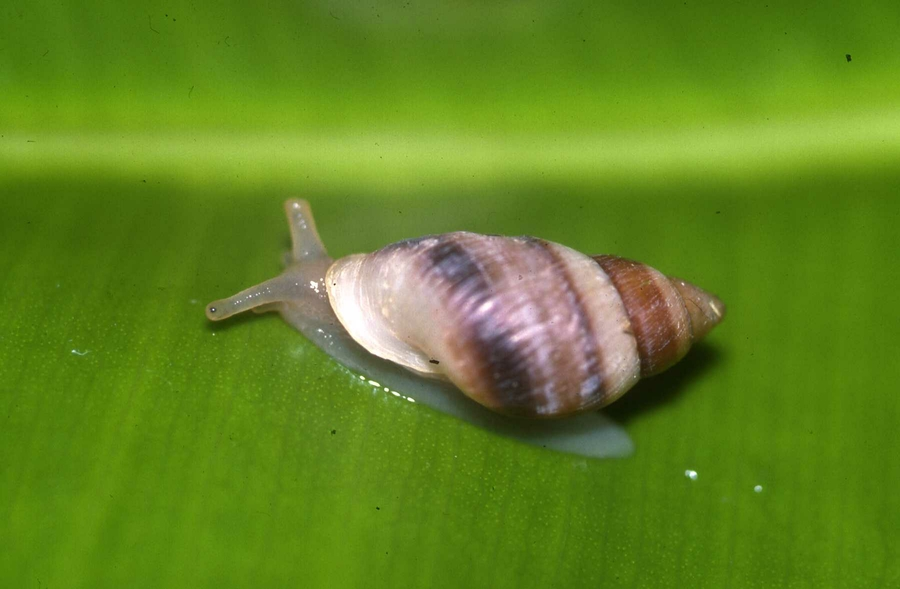

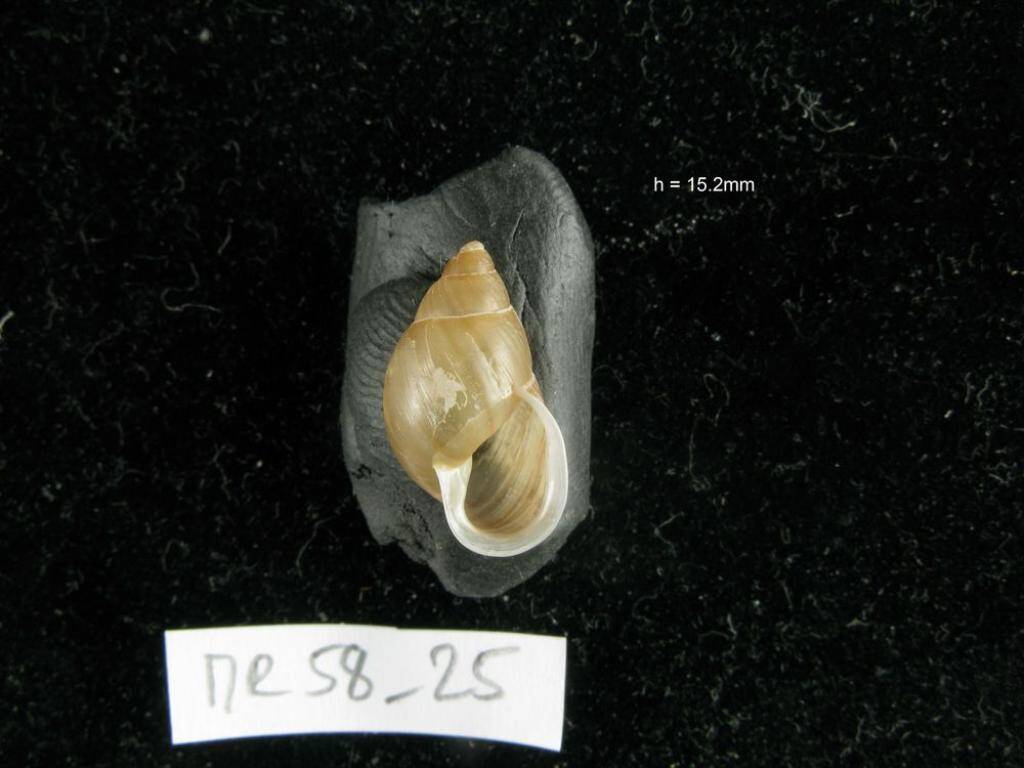
- Shell of Partula taeniata

Conservation status
- Critically Endangered (IUCN 3.1)

Scientific classification
- Kingdom: Animalia
- Phylum: Mollusca
- Class: Gastropoda
- Order: Stylommatophora
- Family: Partulidae
- Genus: Partula
- Species: P. taeniata

Binomial name
- Partula taeniata Mörch, 1850

= Partula taeniata =

Species of gastropod

Partula taeniata, also called the Moorean viviparous tree snail, is a species of terrestrial gastropod in the Partulidae family. It is endemic to French Polynesia.

This species was considered to be extinct in the wild, but intensive field surveys have recently detected surviving wild populations.

== Conservation status ==
The species is listed as Critically Endangered in the 2022 and 2024 IUCN Red List of Threatened Species. Previously it was incorrectly listed as extinct on the IUCN Red List of Threatened Species from 1988 to 1994 and as Extinct in the wild in the 1996 IUCN Red List, before being corrected to Critically Endangered in 2009, although two subspecies survive in captivity and one still exists in the wild.

In 2010, a single Partula taeniata spp. simulans was transferred to the Edinburgh Zoo; the subspecies now has several hundred individuals surviving in captivity.

== Subspecies ==
Listing of subspecies in the 2011 IUCN Red List of Threatened Species (not up to date):

- Partula taeniata elongata Pease, 1866 - extinct in the wild (rediscovered in 2003)
- Partula taeniata nucleola "Pease" Schmeltz, 1874 - extinct in the wild (rediscovered)
- Partula taeniata simulans Pease, 1866 - extinct in the wild
- Partula taeniata taeniata Mörch, 1850 - extinct

== Gallery ==
=== Partula taeniata elongata ===
Maatea Valley population

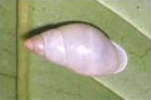
Haumi Valley population (possibly extinct)

=== Partula taeniata nucleola ===
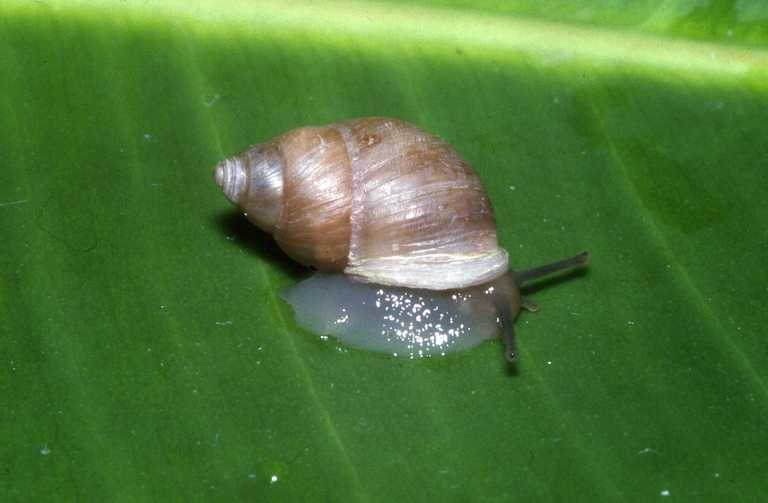
Captive population

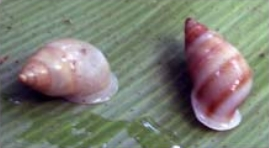
Moruu Valley population

=== Partula taeniata simulans ===
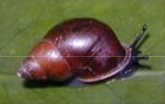
Mount Tohiea population

=== Partula taeniata (unidentified subspecies) ===
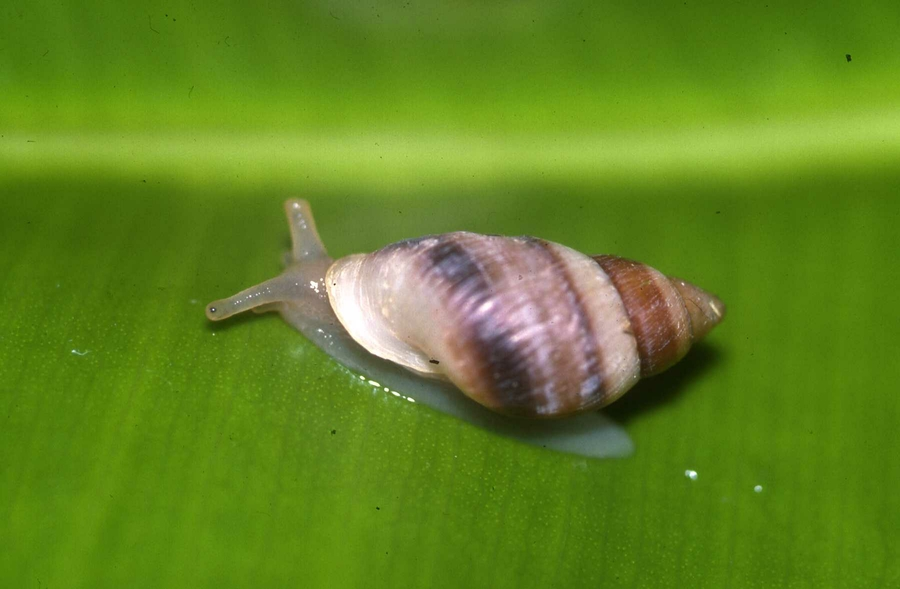
Captive population

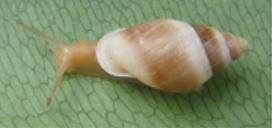
Opunohu Bay population

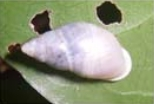
Morioahu Valley population
