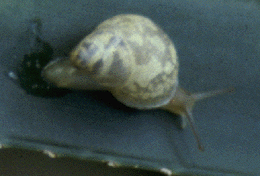

Conservation status
- Critically Endangered (IUCN 3.1)

- Endangered (ESA)

Scientific classification
- Kingdom: Animalia
- Phylum: Mollusca
- Class: Gastropoda
- Order: Stylommatophora
- Family: Partulidae
- Genus: Samoana
- Species: S. fragilis

Binomial name
- Samoana fragilis (Férussac, 1821)

= Samoana fragilis =

Species of gastropod

Samoana fragilis is a species of tropical, air-breathing land snail, a terrestrial, pulmonate, gastropod mollusc in the family Partulidae. This species is known by the common name fragile tree snail and is endemic to the islands of Guam and Rota.
