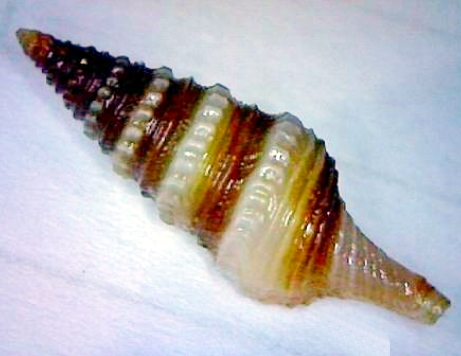
- Shell of Eugemmula championi

Scientific classification
- Kingdom: Animalia
- Phylum: Mollusca
- Class: Gastropoda
- Subclass: Caenogastropoda
- Order: Neogastropoda
- Superfamily: Conoidea
- Family: Turridae
- Genus: Eugemmula
- Species: E. championi

Binomial name
- Eugemmula championi (Kilburn, 1983)

Synonyms
- Gemmula (Gemmula) championi Kilburn, 1983; Gemmula championi Kilburn, 1983 superseded combination; Gemmula pulchella Shuto, 1961 sensu Kuroda et al., 1971

= Eugemmula championi =

Species of gastropod

Eugemmula championi is a species of sea snail, a marine gastropod mollusk in the family Turridae, the turrids.

== Description ==
The length of the shell attains 20 mm.

== Distribution ==
This marine species occurs off Tugela Bank, east of Durban, Rep. South Africa.
