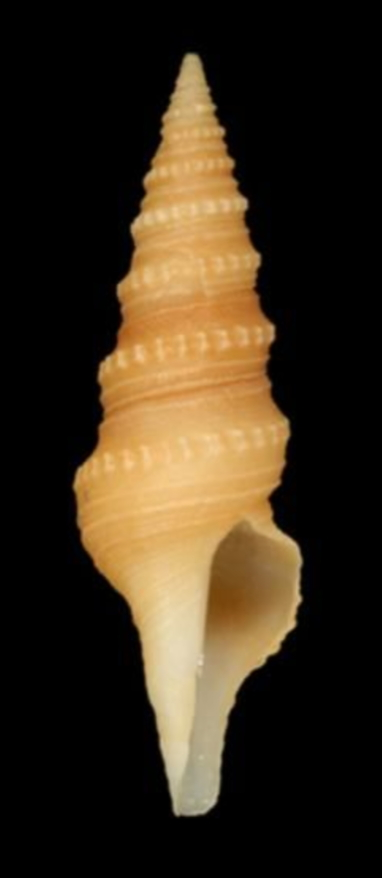
- Shell of Eugemmula hawleyi (syntype in the Australian Museum)

Scientific classification
- Kingdom: Animalia
- Phylum: Mollusca
- Class: Gastropoda
- Subclass: Caenogastropoda
- Order: Neogastropoda
- Superfamily: Conoidea
- Family: Turridae
- Genus: Eugemmula
- Species: E. hawleyi

Binomial name
- Eugemmula hawleyi Iredale, 1931

Synonyms
- Gemmula hawleyi (Iredale, 1931); Gemmula (Gemmula) hawleyi (Iredale, 1931)

= Eugemmula hawleyi =

Species of gastropod

Eugemmula hawleyi is a species of sea snail, a marine gastropod mollusk in the family Turridae, the turrids.

== Distribution ==
This marine species is endemic to Australia and occurs off New South Wales.
