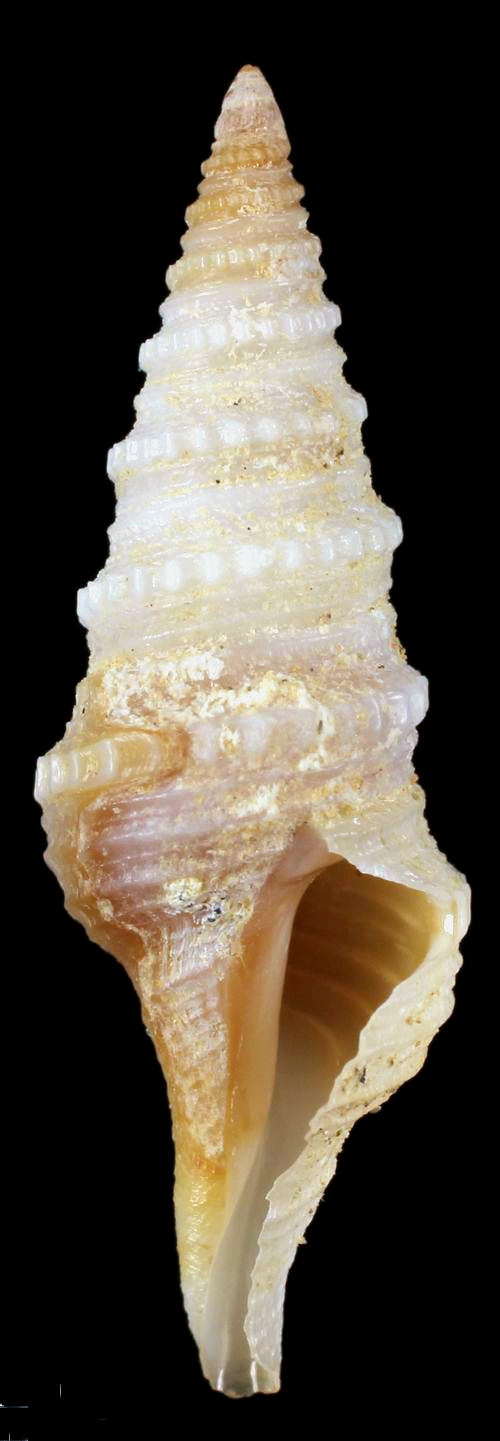
- Shell of Eugemmula amabilis (specimen at MNHN, Paris)

Scientific classification
- Kingdom: Animalia
- Phylum: Mollusca
- Class: Gastropoda
- Subclass: Caenogastropoda
- Order: Neogastropoda
- Superfamily: Conoidea
- Family: Turridae
- Genus: Eugemmula
- Species: E. amabilis

Binomial name
- Eugemmula amabilis (Weinkauff, 1875)

Synonyms
- Gemmula amabilis (Weinkauff, 1875) superseded combination; Pleurotoma amabilis Weinkauff, 1875 (original combination)

= Eugemmula amabilis =

Species of gastropod

Eugemmula amabilis is a species of sea snail, a marine gastropod mollusk in the family Turridae, the turrids.

== Description ==
The length of the shell attains 40 mm.

(Original description in German) The pale yellowish-brown, fusiform shell is rather solid. It is spirally girdled with sutures sculpted with incremental striae. The first cingulum (the spiral ornamentation) is distinctly nodose. The carina (the keel-like structure) is produced, covered with white nodules. The conical spire has an acute apex and shows eleven carinated whorls. The evanescent suture is oblique; the last one is convex. The siphonal canal is narrow and long. The aperture is pear-shaped. It is marginally and internally ribbed. The outer lip is produced below.

== Distribution ==
This species occurs in the Red Sea and the Gulf of Aden.
