= Samoana burchi =

- Samoana burchi from Mount Atara on Tahiti.

Conservation status
- Critically Endangered (IUCN 3.1)

Scientific classification
- Kingdom: Animalia
- Phylum: Mollusca
- Class: Gastropoda
- Order: Stylommatophora
- Family: Partulidae
- Genus: Samoana
- Species: S. burchi

Binomial name
- Samoana burchi Kondo, 1973

Species of gastropod

Samoana burchi is a species of land snail, a terrestrial gastropod mollusc in the Partulidae family. This species is endemic to Tahiti, French Polynesia.

== Distribution ==
The species occurs in two distinct but rather fragmented montane-forest populations on Mount Aorai and Atara.
