= Eugemmula padangensis =

Scientific classification
- Kingdom: Animalia
- Phylum: Mollusca
- Class: Gastropoda
- Subclass: Caenogastropoda
- Order: Neogastropoda
- Superfamily: Conoidea
- Family: Turridae
- Genus: Eugemmula
- Species: E. padangensis

Binomial name
- Eugemmula padangensis (Thiele, 1925)

Synonyms
- Pleurotoma (Gemmula) padangensis Thiele, 1925 superseded combination

Species of gastropod

Eugemmula padangensis is a species of sea snail, a marine gastropod mollusk in the family Turridae, the turrids.

== Description ==
The length of the shell attains 11.5 mm, its diameter 2.4 mm.

== Distribution ==
This marine species is endemic to Indonesia and occurs off western Sumatra.
