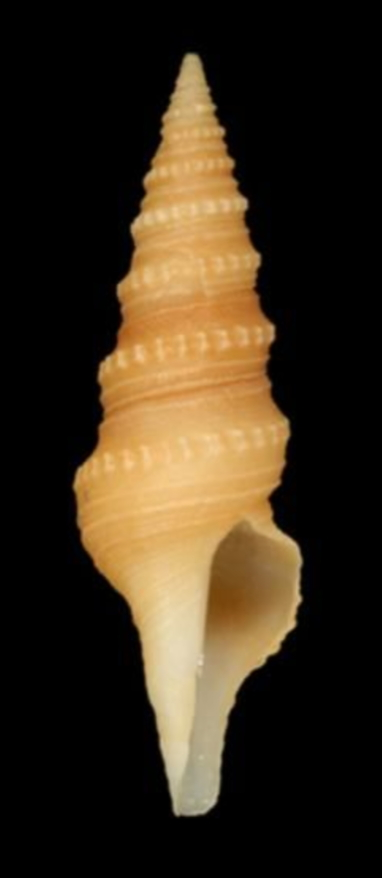
- Shell of Eugemmula hawleyi

Scientific classification
- Kingdom: Animalia
- Phylum: Mollusca
- Class: Gastropoda
- Subclass: Caenogastropoda
- Order: Neogastropoda
- Superfamily: Conoidea
- Family: Turridae
- Genus: Eugemmula; Iredale, 1931

Type species
- Eugemmula hawleyi Iredale, 1931

= Eugemmula =

Genus of gastropods

Eugemmula, common name the gem turrids, is a genus of sea snails, marine gastropod mollusks in the family Turridae, the turrids.

== Species ==
- Eugemmula amabilis (Weinkauff, 1875)
- Eugemmula championi (Kilburn, 1983)
- Eugemmula hawleyi Iredale, 1931
- Eugemmula hombroni (Hedley, 1922)
- Eugemmula monilifera (Pease, 1860)
- Eugemmula padangensis (Thiele, 1925)
