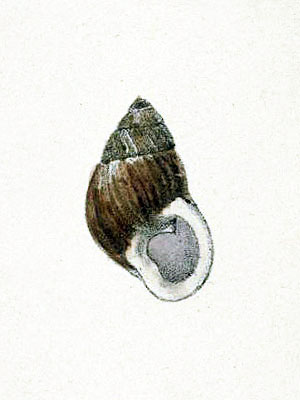

Conservation status
- Extinct (IUCN 3.1)

Scientific classification
- Kingdom: Animalia
- Phylum: Mollusca
- Class: Gastropoda
- Order: Stylommatophora
- Family: Partulidae
- Genus: Partula
- Species: †P. diminuta

Binomial name
- †Partula diminuta Adams, 1851

Synonyms
- Partula filosa Pfeiffer, 1851; Partula lineolata Pease, 1868

= Partula diminuta =

Extinct species of gastropod

Partula diminuta was a species of air-breathing land snail, a terrestrial pulmonate gastropod mollusk in the family Partulidae. It was endemic to Tahiti in the Society Islands of French Polynesia. The species was officially declared extinct by the International Union for Conservation of Nature in June 2024.
