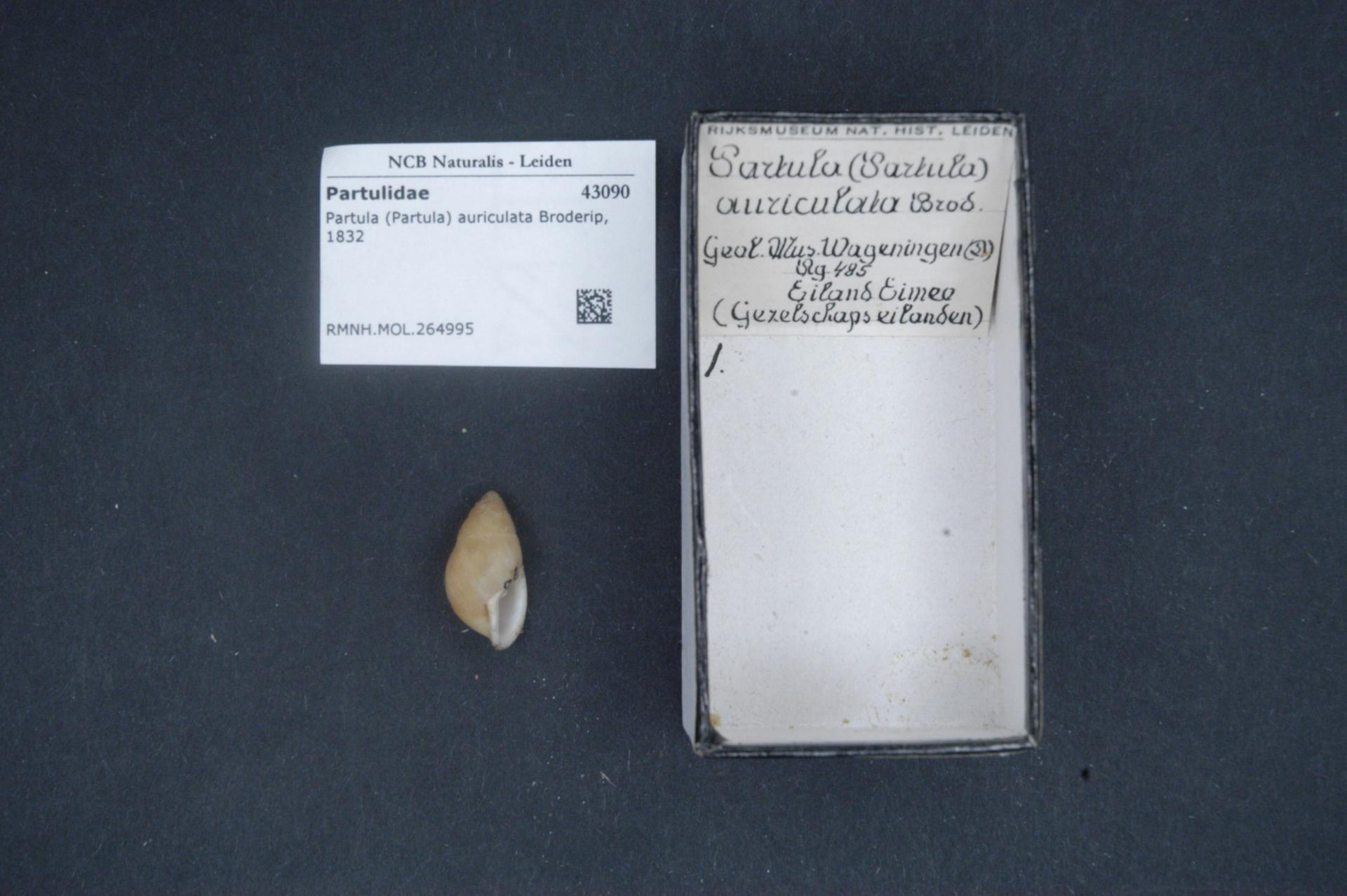

Conservation status
- Extinct (IUCN 3.1)

Scientific classification
- Kingdom: Animalia
- Phylum: Mollusca
- Class: Gastropoda
- Order: Stylommatophora
- Family: Partulidae
- Genus: Partula
- Species: †P. auriculata

Binomial name
- †Partula auriculata Broderip, 1832

= Partula auriculata =

Species of gastropod

Partula auriculata was a species of air-breathing tropical land snail, a terrestrial pulmonate gastropod mollusk in the family Partulidae.

== Distribution ==
This species was endemic to northern Raiatea, French Polynesia. It is now extinct.
