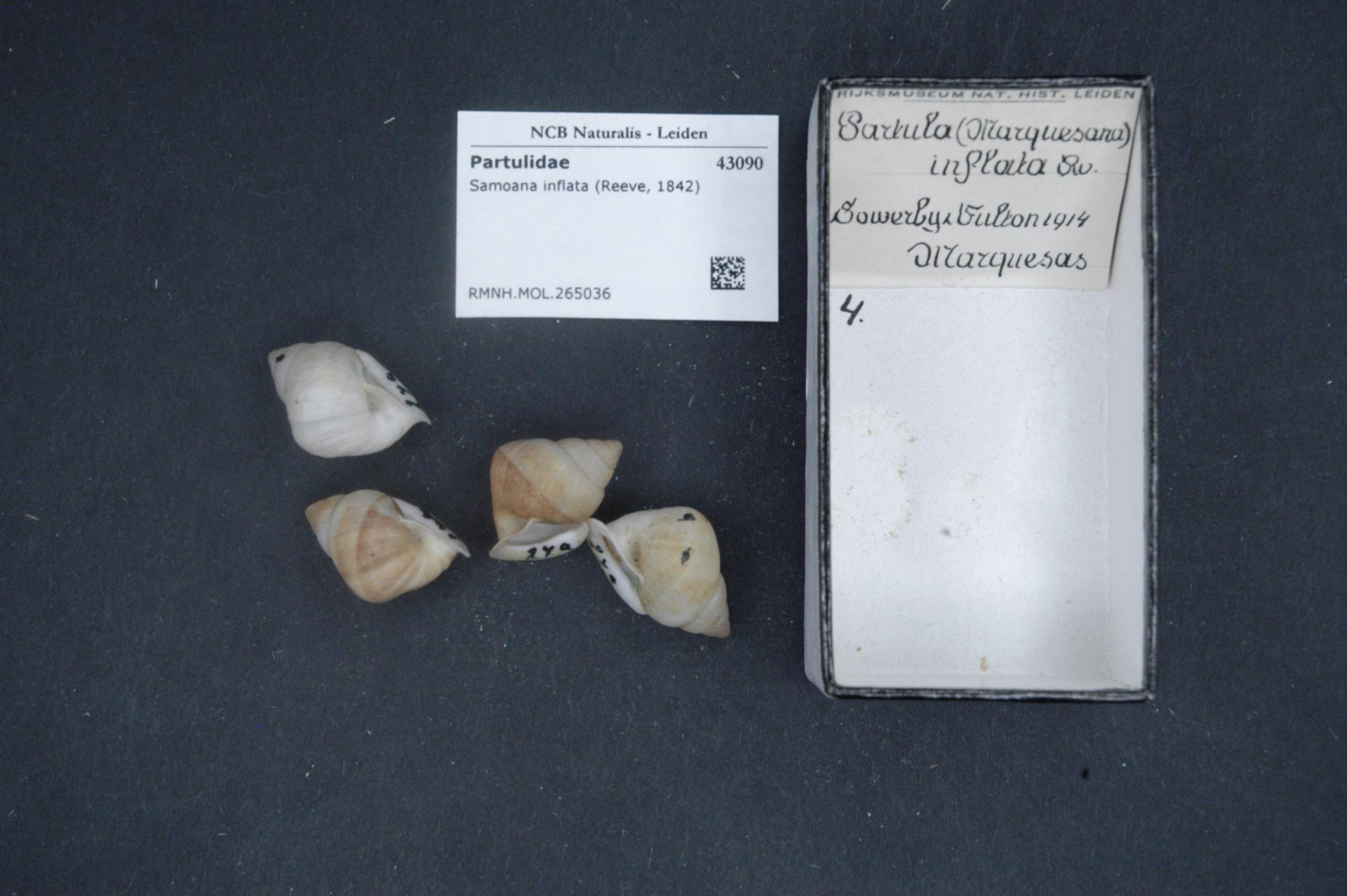

Conservation status
- Extinct (1990s or 2000s) (IUCN 3.1)

Scientific classification
- Kingdom: Animalia
- Phylum: Mollusca
- Class: Gastropoda
- Order: Stylommatophora
- Family: Partulidae
- Genus: Samoana
- Species: †S. inflata

Binomial name
- †Samoana inflata (Reeve, 1842)

Synonyms
- Bulimus thersites L.Pfeiffer, 1842; Partula inflata Reeve, 1842

= Samoana inflata =

Extinct species of gastropod

Samoana inflata was a species of air-breathing land snail, a terrestrial pulmonate gastropod mollusk in the family Partulidae. It was endemic to Hiva Oa and Tahuata in the Marquesas Islands and went extinct in the 1990s or 2000s.
