= Conus peasei =

Scientific classification
- Kingdom: Animalia
- Phylum: Mollusca
- Class: Gastropoda
- Subclass: Caenogastropoda
- Order: Neogastropoda
- Superfamily: Conoidea
- Family: Conidae
- Genus: Conus
- Species: C. peasei

Binomial name
- Conus peasei (Brazier, 1877)

Synonyms
- Conus neglectus Pease, 1861; Lithoconus peasei Brazier, 1877

Species of gastropod

Conus peasei is a species of sea snail, a marine gastropod mollusk, in the family Conidae, the cone snails and their allies.
