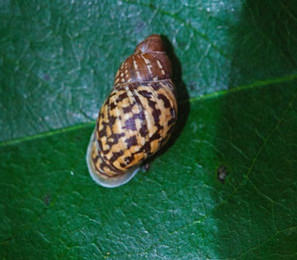
- E. zebrina

Scientific classification
- Kingdom: Animalia
- Phylum: Mollusca
- Class: Gastropoda
- Order: Stylommatophora
- Family: Partulidae
- Genus: Eua; Pilsbry & Cooke, 1934

Type species
- Eua globosa Pilsbry & Cooke 1934

= Eua (gastropod) =

Genus of gastropods

Eua is a genus of air-breathing land snails, terrestrial pulmonate gastropod mollusks in the family Partulidae.

== Species ==
Species within the genus Eua include:

- Eua expansa
- Eua globosa
- Eua montana
- Eua zebrina

A cladogram showing phylogenic relations of Eua species:

- - - Eua zebrina
    - Eua montana
  - Eua expansa
- Eua globosa
