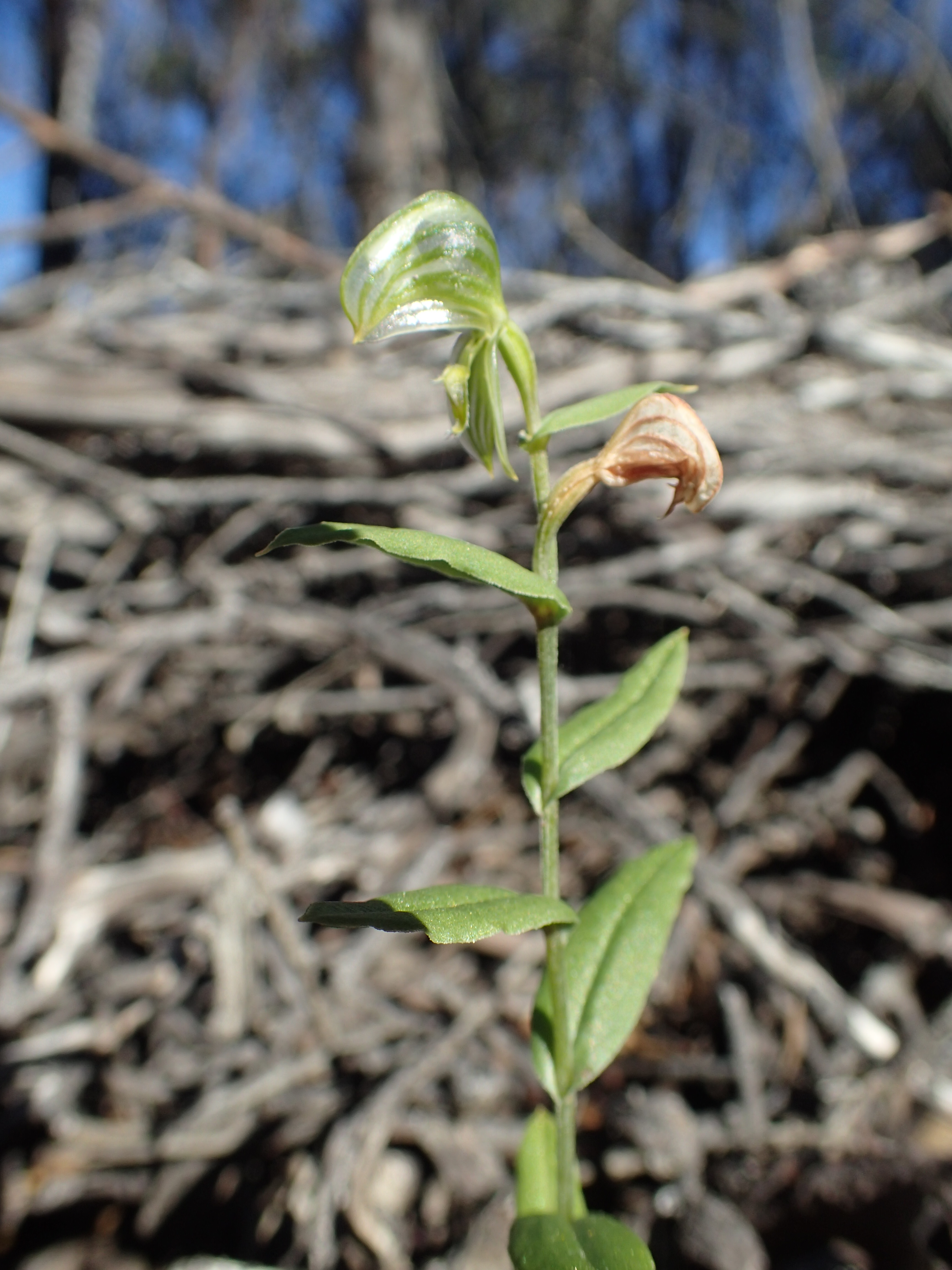
- Pterostylis leptochila growing south of Ravensthorpe

Scientific classification
- Kingdom: Plantae
- Clade: Tracheophytes
- Clade: Angiosperms
- Clade: Monocots
- Order: Asparagales
- Family: Orchidaceae
- Subfamily: Orchidoideae
- Tribe: Cranichideae
- Genus: Pterostylis
- Species: P. leptochila

Binomial name
- Pterostylis leptochila M.A.Clem. & D.L.Jones

Synonyms
- Oligochaetochilus leptochilus (M.A.Clem. & D.L.Jones) Szlach.

= Pterostylis leptochila =

Ravensthorpe rufous greenhood

Species of orchid

Pterostylis leptochila, commonly known as the Ravensthorpe rufous greenhood or narrow-lipped rustyhood is a plant in the orchid family Orchidaceae and is endemic to the south-west of Western Australia. Both flowering and non-flowering plants have a relatively large rosette of leaves. Flowering plants also have up to five large translucent white flowers with olive green and brown lines and markings and a narrow, insect-like labellum.

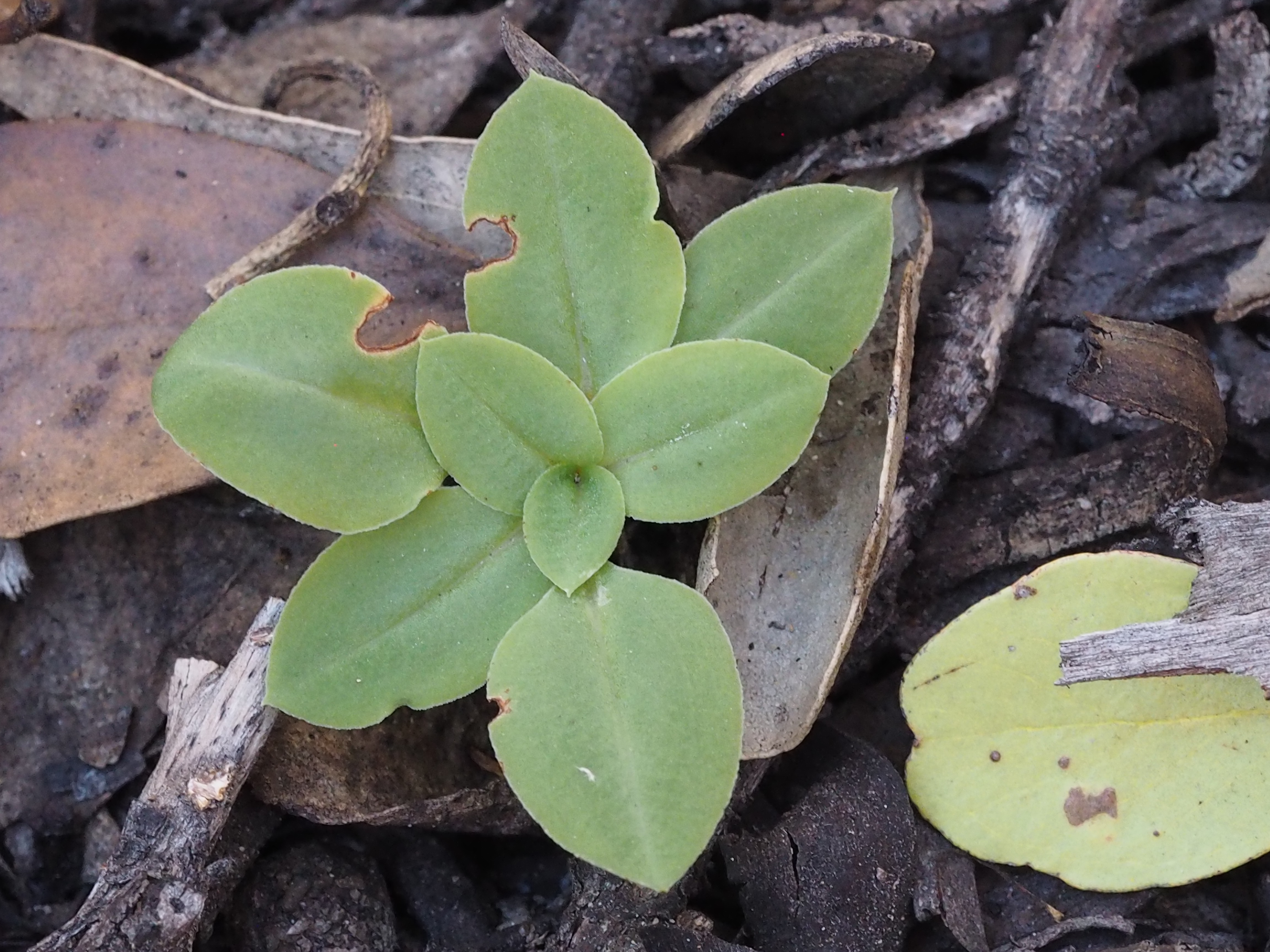
leaf rosette

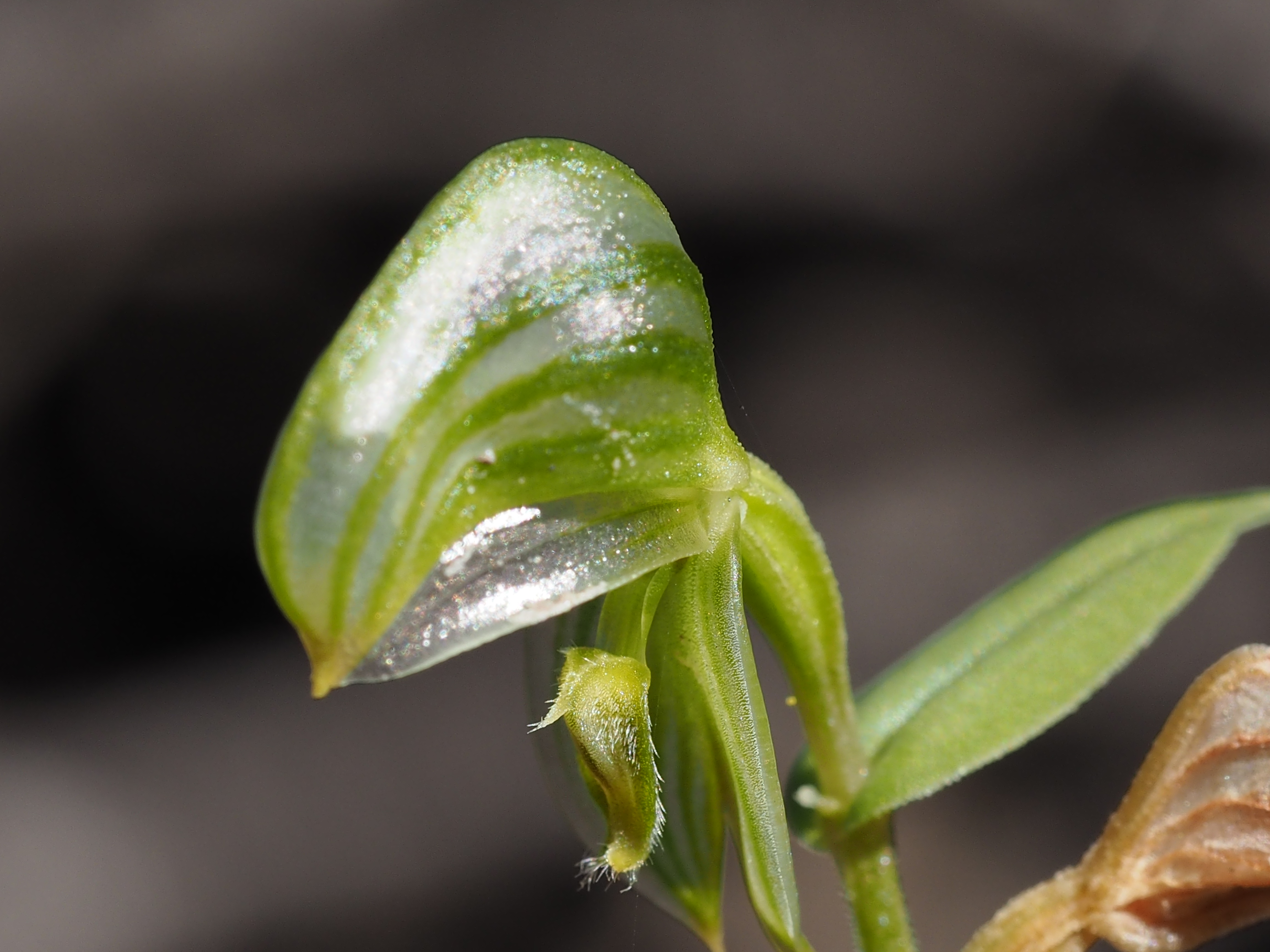
labellum detail

== Description ==
Pterostylis leptochila is a terrestrial, perennial, deciduous, herb with an underground tuber and a rosette of between six and ten leaves. The leaves are 18–35 mm (0.7–1 in) long and 7–12 mm (0.3–0.5 in) wide. Flowering plants have a rosette at the base of the flowering stem but the leaves are usually withered by flowering time. Up to five or more translucent white, olive green and brown flowers, 23–27 mm (0.9–1 in) long and 7–8 mm (0.28–0.31 in) wide are borne on a flowering spike 150–250 mm (6–10 in) tall. The dorsal sepal and petals form a hood or "galea" over the column with the dorsal sepal having a narrow tip 5–7 mm (0.2–0.3 in) long. The lateral sepals turn downwards, slightly wider than the galea and suddenly taper to narrow tips 10–15 mm (0.4–0.6 in) long which turn forward and spread apart from each other. The labellum is fleshy, greenish-brown and insect-like, 5–6 mm (0.20–0.24 in) long, about 2 mm (0.08 in) wide and covered with short hairs. Flowering occurs from September to November.

== Taxonomy and naming ==
Pterostylis leptochila was first formally described in 1989 by Mark Clements and David Jones from a specimen collected near Ravensthorpe and the description was published in Australian Orchid Research. The specific epithet (leptochila) is derived from the Ancient Greek words leptos meaning "fine" or "small" and cheilos meaning "lip" or "rim" referring to the narrow labellum of this orchid.

== Distribution and habitat ==
The Ravensthorpe rufous greenhood grows in rocky soil in woodland and shrubland between Jerramungup and Ravensthorpe in the Esperance Plains and Mallee biogeographic regions.

== Conservation ==
Pterostylis leptochila is classified as "not threatened" by the Western Australian Government Department of Parks and Wildlife.
