= Partula jackieburchi =

Conservation status
- Critically endangered, possibly extinct (IUCN 3.1)

Scientific classification
- Kingdom: Animalia
- Phylum: Mollusca
- Class: Gastropoda
- Order: Stylommatophora
- Family: Partulidae
- Genus: Partula
- Species: P. jackieburchi

Binomial name
- Partula jackieburchi Kondo, 1980

Synonyms
- Samoana jackieburchi Y. Kondo, 1981 (original combination)

Species of gastropod

Partula jackieburchi is a possibly extinct species of tropical, air-breathing land snail, a terrestrial, pulmonate, gastropod mollusk in the family Partulidae.

This species is endemic to Tahiti, Society Islands, French Polynesia.

== Taxonomy ==
The taxonomy of this species has changed several times and remains unclarified and disputed. It has been recombined as Partula jackieburchi and in 1986 was referred to as Partula otaheitana rubescens.

== Extinction ==
This species is believed to have become extinct after the introduction of the carnivorous wolf snail to Tahiti in 1977. No living individuals were found during searches in the 1980s and the 1990s. In 2003-2005, an extensive survey was conducted on Tahiti Nui, and no living specimens of this species were found.
