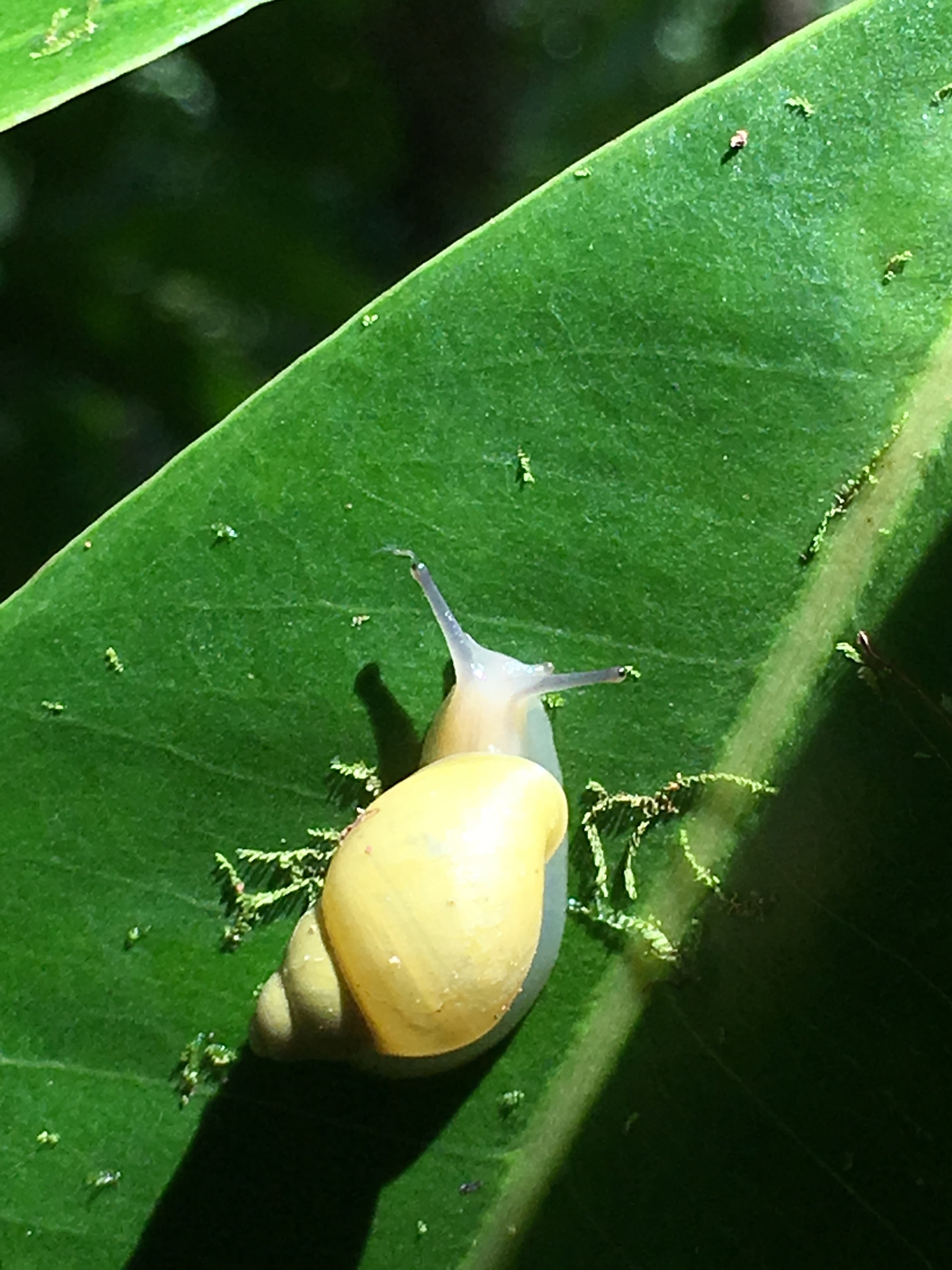
- Samoana conica

Scientific classification
- Kingdom: Animalia
- Phylum: Mollusca
- Class: Gastropoda
- Order: Stylommatophora
- Infraorder: Pupilloidei
- Superfamily: Pupilloidea
- Family: Partulidae
- Genus: Samoana; Pilsbry, 1909

Type species
- Partula canalis Mousson, 1865

Synonyms
- Aega Hartman, 1881; Evadne Hartman, 1881; Latia Hartman, 1881 (unavailable; a junior homonym of Latia Gray, 1850 [Latiidae]); Partula (Aega) Hartman, 1881 (invalid: junior homobnym of Aega Leach, 1815 [Crustacea]; Marquesana is a replacement name); Partula (Evadne) Hartman, 1881 (invalid: junior homonym of Evadne Lovén, 1836 [Cnidaria]; Samoana is a replacement name); Partula (Latia) Hartman, 1881 (invalid: junior homonym of Latia Gray, 1850 [Gastropoda]; Marquesana is a replacement name; Partula (Marquesana) Pilsbry, 1909; Partula (Samoana) Pilsbry, 1909 (original rank); Samoana (Marquesana) Pilsbry, 1909 · alternate representation; Samoana (Samoana) Pilsbry, 1909 · alternate representation

= Samoana =

Genus of gastropods

Samoana is a genus of tropical, air-breathing, land snails, terrestrial pulmonate gastropod molluscs in the family Partulidae.

== Species ==
Species within the genus Samoana include:

- Samoana abbreviata (Mousson, 1869), (short Samoan tree snail)
- Samoana alabastrina (L. Pfeiffer, 1857)
- Samoana annectens (Pease, 1865)
- Samoana attenuata (Pease, 1865)
- Samoana bellula (Hartman, 1885)
- Samoana burchi Y. Kondo, 1973
- Samoana conica (A. Gould, 1847)
- Samoana cramptoni Pilsbry & C. M. Cooke, 1934
- Samoana decussatula (L. Pfeiffer, 1850)
- Samoana diaphana (Crampton & C. M. Cooke, 1953) (Moorean viviparous tree snail)
- Samoana dryas (Crampton & C. M. Cooke, 1953) (Raivavae tree snail)
- Samoana fragilis (Férussac, 1821) (fragile tree snail)
- Samoana ganymedes (L. Pfeiffer, 1846)
- Samoana gonochila (L. Pfeiffer, 1847)
- Samoana inflata (Reeve, 1842)
- Samoana margaritae (Crampton & C. M. Cooke, 1933)
- Samoana medana Y. Kondo & J. B. Burch, 1989
- Samoana minuta (L. Pfeiffer, 1857)
- Samoana pilsbryi Gerlach, 2016 (Pilsbry's tree snail)
- Samoana stevensoniana (Pilsbry, 1909)
- Samoana thurstoni (Crampton & C. M. Cooke, 1930)

Synonyms

- Samoana canalis (Mousson, 1865): synonym of Samoana conica (A. Gould, 1847)
- Samoana hamadryas Crampton & Cooke, 1953: synonym of Samoana dryas Crampton & Cooke, 1953
- Samoana jackieburchi Y. Kondo, 1981: synonym of Partula jackieburchi (Y. Kondo, 1981) (original combination)
- Samoana magdalinae (Hartman, 1885): synonym of Samoana minuta (Pfeiffer, 1857)
- Samoana meyeri (Burch, 2007): synonym of Partula meyeri Burch, 2007
- Samoana oreas Crampton & Cooke, 1953: synonym of Samoana dryas Crampton & Cooke, 1953
- Samoana strigata (Pease, 1868): synonym of Samoana gonochila (Pfeiffer, 1847)

A cladogram showing the phylogenic relations of Samoana and three of its investigated species:

- Partulidae
  - - Partula
    - - Samoana
        - - Samoana diaphana
          - Samoana burchi
        - Samoana attenuata
  - Eua

== Description ==
The genus Samoana was defined by American malacologist Henry Augustus Pilsbry in Manual of Conchology in 1909:

The shell is very openly umbilicate, dextral or sinistral, with flatly reflexed lip and no teeth. Type P. canalis. Samoan Is., species 53 to 58.

In 1909, Pilsbry assigned six species to the genus Samoana.
