= Henry Crampton =

American paleontologist (1875–1956)

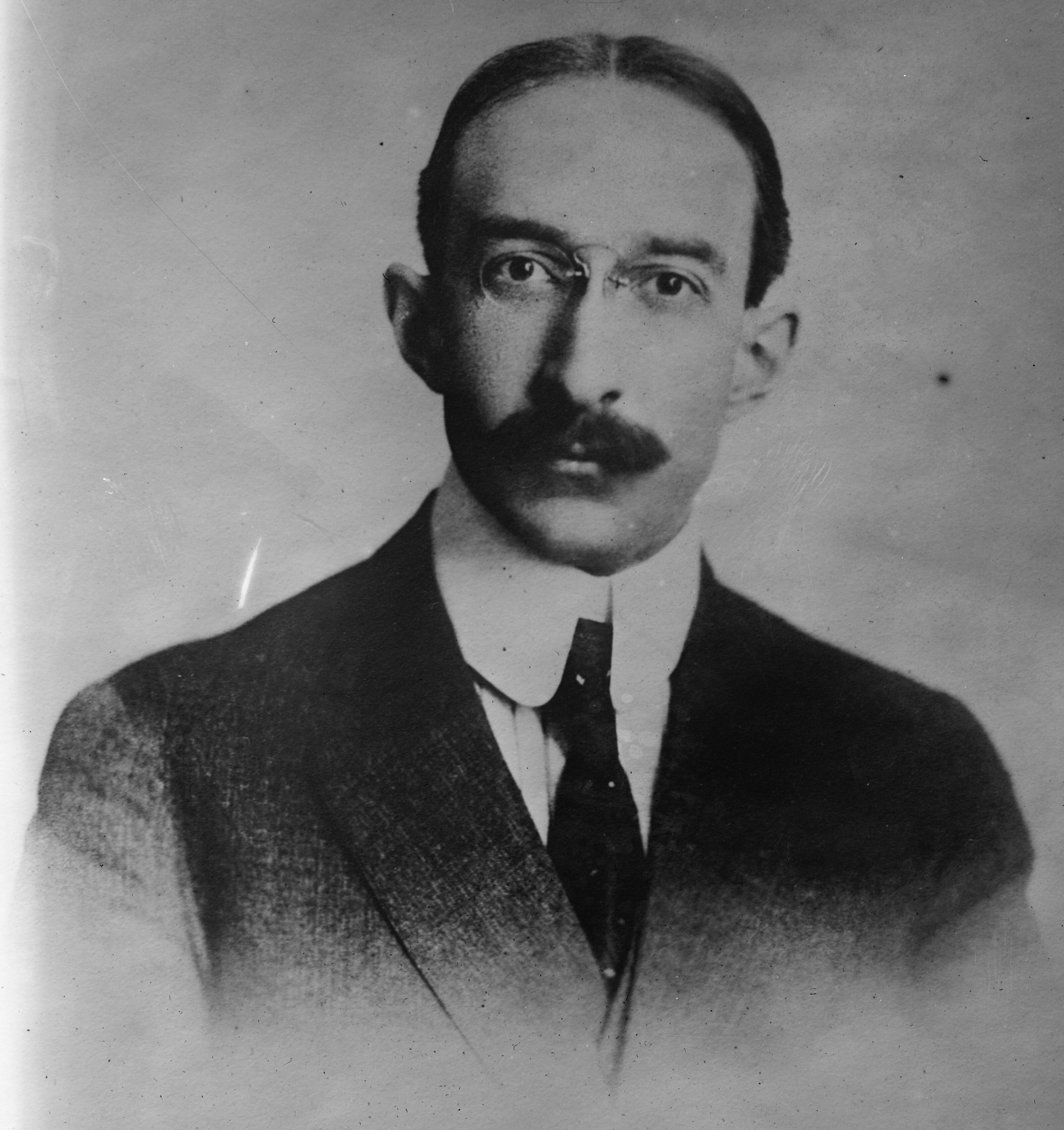
- Born: Henry Edward Crampton Jr. January 5, 1875; New York City, New York, U.S.
- Died: February 26, 1956 (aged 81); New York City, New York, U.S.
- Education: Columbia College (PhD)
- Spouse: Marian Maud Tully (m. 1896)
- Children: 2
- Scientific career
- Workplaces: Columbia University; Massachusetts Institute of Technology; American Museum of Natural History

Henry Edward Crampton (January 5, 1875 – February 26, 1956) was an American evolutionary biologist and malacologist who specialized in land snails. Crampton undertook the first major study of evolution in nature in his research in the Society Islands. Crampton made twelve separate expeditions over the course of his career to Moorea near Tahiti to study the land snail genus Partula, while years more were spent measuring and cataloguing his specimens. In all, he dedicated nearly half-a-century to the study. Crampton taught as a professor at Columbia University and Barnard College from 1904 to 1943. He also worked as a curator at the American Museum of Natural History.

== Early life ==
Henry Edward Crampton Jr. was born on January 5, 1875, in New York City to Dorcas Matilda (née Miller) and Henry Edward Crampton, a surgeon in New York City. He attended the College of the City of New York and graduated from Columbia College (later Columbia University) in 1893. He received his Doctor of Philosophy from Columbia in 1899.

== Career ==
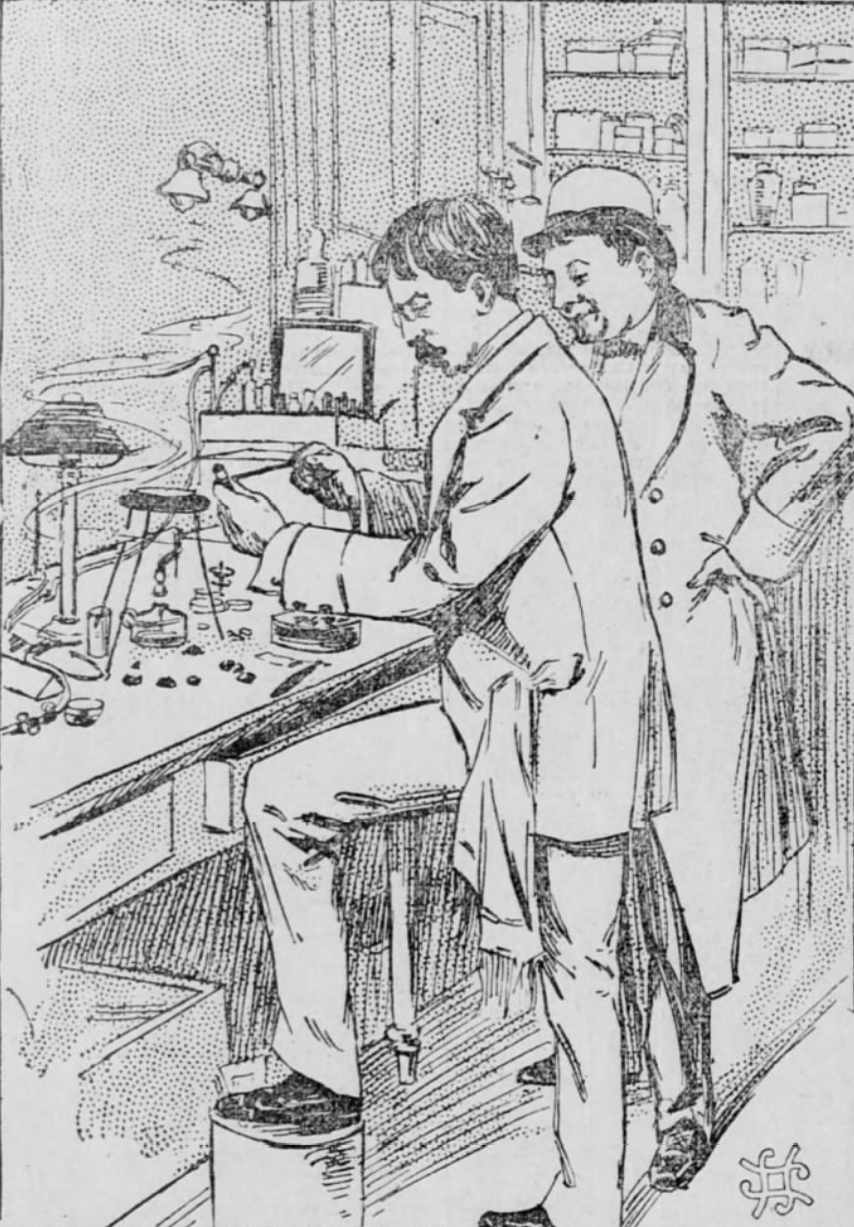
Drawing of Crampton experimenting with insects (1898)

After graduating in 1893, Crampton became an assistant in biology at Columbia University. He stayed in that role until 1895, when he became an instructor of biology at the Massachusetts Institute of Technology. The following year, 1896, he returned to Columbia as a lecturer. Crampton became a faculty member at Barnard College in 1899. By 1904, Crampton became a professor of zoology at Barnard College and Columbia University. He served as acting provost at Barnard in 1918 and 1919. He remained a professor until 1943.

Crampton was the curator of invertebrate zoology at the American Museum of Natural History. Stephen Jay Gould has cited Crampton as an inspiration, both for his evolutionary observations on Partula, and the enormous dedication and effort required to undertake them. He was also the inspiration for future work on Partula by Bryan Clarke, James Murray and Michael Johnson. This research was central to much of the development of the science of genetics. He also worked at the Carnegie Institute's Station for Experimental Evolution at Cold Spring Harbor Laboratory and Bishop Museum in Honolulu.

Crampton's monographs remain some of the most remarkable publications on any species, for their meticulous detail and the beautiful illustrations they contain. His work on the Society Islands species was never finished, his monographs covering only those of Tahiti and Moorea. The volumes on Huahine, Raiatea, Tahaa and Bora Bora were never finished. This work is being revived, and the centenary of his first volume (Tahiti in 1916) is to be marked by the publication of a new monograph on all the Partulidae.

During World War I, Crampton worked with Hollis Godfrey to organize the Council of National Defense, and served as the vice chairman of the Committee on Engineering and Education.

He also served as president of the New York Academy of Sciences and as secretary of the American Eugenics Society. He was also a member of the Washington Academy of Sciences, New York Zoological Society, American Society of Naturalists and The Explorers Club. In 1929, he received an honorary degree in science from Columbia.

== Personal life and death ==
Crampton married Marian Maud Tully on October 27, 1896, in New York City. Together, they had two children: Henry and Ann. Henry E. Crampton Jr. married Harriet Jessup, the granddaughter of Reverend Jessup, founder of the American University of Beirut.

Crampton died on February 26, 1956, at NewYork-Presbyterian Hospital in New York City.

== Selected bibliography ==
- Crampton H. E. 1916. The Doctrine of Evolution Its Basis and Its Scope. New, York, Columebia University Press.
- Crampton H. E. 1916. Studies on the variation, distribution and evolution of the genus Partula. The species inhabiting Tahiti. Carnegie Institution of Washington, 228: 1-311.
- Crampton H. E. 1925. Studies on the variation, distribution and evolution of the genus Partula. The species of the Mariana Islands, Guam and Saipan. Carnegie Institution of Washington, 228a: 1-116.
- Cooke C. M. & Crampton H. E. (1930) "New species of Partula". B. P. Bishop. Mus. Occ. Papers 9: 3-5.
- Crampton H. E. 1932. Studies on the variation, distribution and evolution of the genus Partula. The species inhabiting Moorea. Carnegie Institution of Washington, 410: 1-335.

== Bibliography ==
- Gould, Stephen Jay [1993] (2007) "Unenchanted Evening," Eight Little Piggies. Vintage Books. ISBN 978-0-09-950744-4
- Finding aid to the Henry Crampton papers at Columbia University.
