= William Harper Pease =

American conchologist and malacologist (1824–1871)

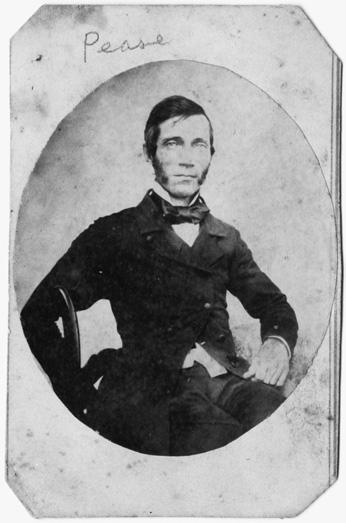
- circa 1860
- Born: 1824
- Died: 1871 (aged 46–47)
- Occupation: Zoologist, malacologist

William Harper Pease (1824–1871) was a 19th-century American conchologist, shell collector and malacologist. He described many species of Indo-Pacific marine mollusks from the Cuming collection.

He moved in 1849 to Honolulu, from where he continued his research

One of the genera he described and named was the sea slug genus: Philinopsis Pease, 1860

Several species were named in his honor : Favartia peasei (Tryon, 1880), Conus peasei J. Brazier, 1877, Amygdalum peasei W. Newcomb, 1870 and Hypselodoris peasei (Bergh, 1880)

For many years, no image of Pease was known, until a 2021 paper revealed that two cartes-de-visite (one shown above) had been discovered in the Bishop Museum Archives, Honolulu.

== Bibliography ==
- Pease, W. H. (1860). Descriptions of new species of Mollusca from the Sandwich Islands. Proceedings of the Zoological Society of London, pt. 28, pp. 18–36.
- Pease, W. H. (1861). Descriptions of new species of Mollusca from the Pacific Islands. Proceedings of the Zoological Society of London. 1861 pp. 242–247.
- Pease, W. H. (1863). [Letter. On errors and omissions in former communications.]. Proceedings of the Zoological Society of London. 1863 p. 510.
- Pease, W. H. (1866). Remarks on nudibranchiata inhabiting the Pacific islands, with descriptions of two new genera. American Journal of Conchology 2(2): 204–208.
- Pease, W. H. (1871). Descriptions of new species of Nudibranchiate Mollusca inhabiting Polynesia. No.2. American Journal of Conchology. 7 (1): 11–19
