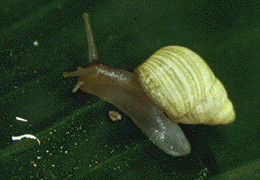
- Partula radiolata

Scientific classification
- Kingdom: Animalia
- Phylum: Mollusca
- Class: Gastropoda
- Order: Stylommatophora
- Suborder: Helicina
- Infraorder: Pupilloidei
- Superfamily: Pupilloidea
- Family: Partulidae; Pilsbry, 1900

= Partulidae =

Family of gastropods

Partulidae is a family of air-breathing land snails, terrestrial gastropod mollusks in the superfamily Pupilloidea.

The family is endemic to Pacific islands.

== Genera ==
The Partulidae are divided into five genera:

- Eua has four species, confined to Tonga and Samoa.
- Palaopartula Pilsbry, 1909- has three species, restricted to the Palau.
- Partula Pilsbry, 1909 - has about 100 species, distributed from New Guinea to the Society Islands.
- Samoana Pilsbry, 1909 - has about 23 species, distributed in Polynesia and the Mariana Islands.
- Sphendone has a single species from the Palau.

This cladogram shows the phylogenic relationships of genera in the family Partulidae:

- Partulidae
  - - Partula
    - Samoana
    - Palaopartula
  - Eua
  - Sphendone

== Synonyms ==
- Aega Hartman, 1881: synonym of Samoana (Marquesana) Pilsbry, 1909 represented as Samoana Pilsbry, 1909
- Astraea Hartman, 1881: synonym of Partula A. Férussac, 1821
- Clytia Hartman, 1881: synonym of Partula A. Férussac, 1821
- Echo Hartman, 1881: synonym of Partula (Leptopartula) Pilsbry, 1909: synonym of Partula A. Férussac, 1821
- Evadne Hartman, 1881: synonym of Samoana Pilsbry, 1909
- Harmonia Hartman, 1881: synonym of Partula (Marianella) Pilsbry, 1909: synonym of v
- Helena Hartman, 1881: synonym ofPartula A. Férussac, 1821
- Latia Hartman, 1881: synonym of Samoana (Marquesana) Pilsbry, 1909 represented as Samoana Pilsbry, 1909 (unavailable; a junior homonym of Latia Gray, 1850 [Latiidae])
- Marianna Pilsbry, 1909: synonym of Partula (Marianella) Pilsbry, 1909: synonym of Partula A. Férussac, 1821
- Matata Hartman, 1881: synonym of Partula A. Férussac, 1821
- Nenia Hartman, 1881: synonym of Partula A. Férussac, 1821
- Oenone Hartman, 1881: synonym of Partula A. Férussac, 1821
- Pasithea Hartman, 1881: synonym of Partula A. Férussac, 1821(junior synonym)
- Rennellia Clench, 1941: synonym of Partula A. Férussac, 1821 (junior synonym)
- Scilistylus Iredale, 1941: synonym ofPartula A. Férussac, 1821
- Sterope Hartman, 1881: synonym of Partula (Melanesica) Pilsbry, 1909: synonym of Partula A. Férussac, 1821

== Anatomy ==
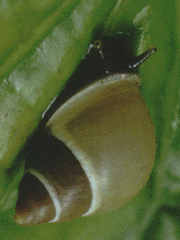
Partula gibba

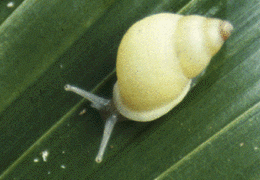
Partula langfordi

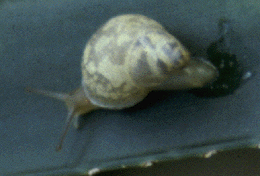
Samoana fragilis

In this family, the number of haploid chromosomes lies between 26 and 30 (according to the values in this table).

== Significance ==
The Partulidae represent a significant species radiation and were important in the development of modern evolutionary studies through the work of Henry Crampton in the early 20th century and later by Bryan Clarke, James Murray and Michael Johnson.

== Status ==
Most Partulidae species have declined since 1974 and a very large proportion are extinct. The main threat to their survival has been the introduction of the predatory snail Euglandina rosea.
