= Timeline of extinctions in the 20th century =

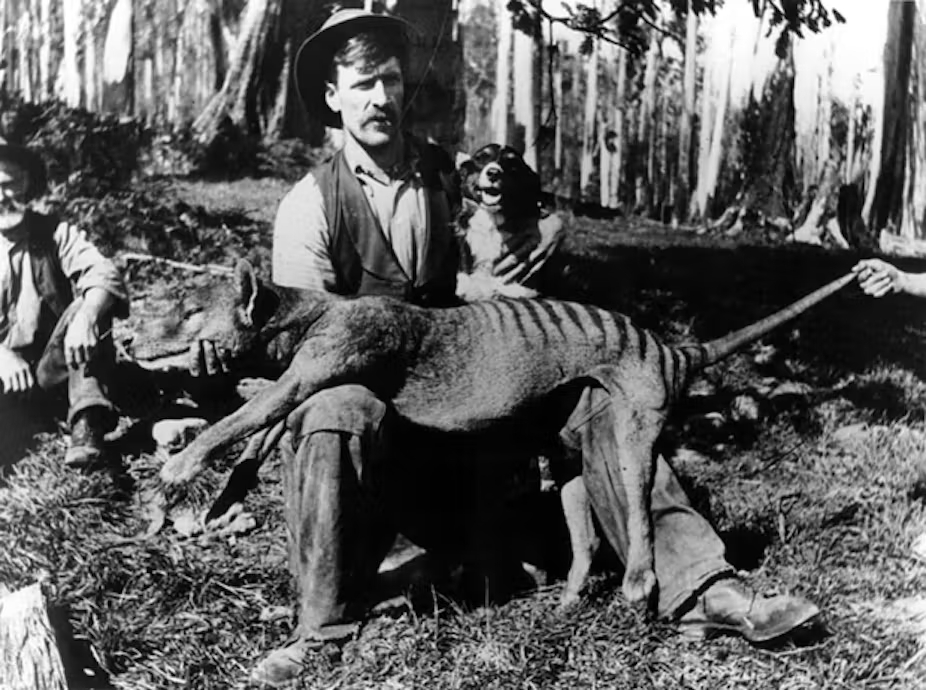
Tasmanian hunter with a thylacine kill, 1921.

This timeline of extinctions is a chronological list of biological species, subspecies, and other evolutionary significant units recorded to have disappeared during the course of the 20th century.

Following the parent timeline of extinctions in the Holocene, the entries included range from 1900 to 1999, even though the 20th century is properly established to have lasted from 1 January 1901 to 31 December 2000. For extinctions in 2000, see timeline of extinctions in the Holocene#21st century.

The list is incomplete by necessity, since the majority of extinctions are thought to be undocumented, and for many others there isn't a definitive, widely accepted last, or most recent record. According to the species-area theory, the present rate of extinction may be up to 140,000 species per year.

== Timeline ==
=== 1900s ===
Last record	Common name	Binomial name	Former range	Declared extinct	Causes	Picture
c. 1900	Caucasian moose	Alces alces caucasicus	Northern Caucasus and Transcaucasian shore of the Black Sea		Hunting. The subspecies' validity is questioned because moose from Russia recolonized the Caucasian moose's former range naturally over the 20th century.	
c. 1900	Saint Croix racer	Borikenophis sanctaecrucis	Saint Croix, United States Virgin Islands		Undetermined.	
c. 1900	Gravenche	Coregonus hiemalis	Lake Geneva, Swiss-French border	2008 (IUCN)	Eutrophication and overfishing.	
c. 1900	Northeastern black rhinoceros	Diceros bicornis brucii	Horn of Africa to eastern Sudan and Bahr el Ghazal		Hunting and habitat loss.	
c. 1900		Genophantis leahi	Maui, Oahu, Molokai and Hawaii (island), Hawaii, United States	1994 (IUCN)	Undetermined.	
c. 1900-1950	Lord Howe long-eared bat	Nyctophilus howensis	Lord Howe Island, Australia	2020 (IUCN)	Possibly predation by introduced owls and rats.	
1900
1900	Light-loving noctuid moth	Agrotis photophila	Oahu, Hawaii, United States	1986 (IUCN)	Undetermined.	
1900	Koʻolau spurwing long-legged fly	Campsicnemus mirabilis	Mount Tantalus, Hawaii, United States	1986 (IUCN)	Predation by the introduced ant Pheidole megacephala.	
1900		Coloceras hemiphagae	Norfolk Island, Australia		Extinction of their host, the Norfolk pigeon.	
1900		Coloceras restinctus	Norfolk Island, Australia		Extinction of their host, the Norfolk pigeon.	
1900	Leafshell	Epioblasma flexuosa	Tennessee, Cumberland, and Ohio River systems, United States	1983 (IUCN)	Undetermined.	
1900		Eugenia scheffleri	Usambara Mountains, Tanzania		Possibly deforestation for agriculture.	
1900	Norfolk pigeon	Hemiphaga novaeseelandiae spadicea	Norfolk Island, Australia		Hunting.	
1900	Oʻahu ʻākepa	Loxops wolstenholmei	Oahu mountains, Hawaii, United States		Probably habitat destruction, introduced predators and avian diseases.	
1900-1905	Oahu treesnails	Achatinella buddii	Koolau Mountains and Niu Valley, Hawaii, United States	1990 (IUCN)	Undetermined.	
1900-1905	Oahu treesnails	Achatinella caesia	Palolo, Hawaii, United States	1990 (IUCN)	Undetermined.	
1900-1905	Oahu treesnails	Achatinella decora	Koolau Mountains, Hawaii	1990 (IUCN)	Undetermined.	
1900-1905	Kona giant looper moth	Scotorythra megalophylla	Hawaii, United States	1996 (IUCN)	Undetermined.	
1900-1905	Koʻolau giant looper moth	Scotorythra nesiotes	Hawaii, United States	1996 (IUCN)	Undetermined.	
1900–1909	Oahu treesnail	Achatinella thaanumi	Waiʻanae, Hawaii, United States	1990 (IUCN)	Undetermined.	
1900–1909	Skadar nase	Chondrostoma scodrense	Lake Skadar, Albania-Montenegro border		Undetermined.	
1900–1909		Leucocharis loyaltiensis	New Caledonia	1994 (IUCN)	Undetermined.	
1900–1909		Leucocharis porphyrocheila	New Caledonia	1994 (IUCN)	Undetermined.	
1901	Car Nicobar sparrowhawk (Note: Unconfirmed report from 1977 (Hume, 2017).)	Accipiter butleri butleri	Car Nicobar, Nicobar Islands, India	1995	Habitat destruction.	
1901	Pig-footed bandicoot (Note: Unconfirmed reports from natives until the 1950s (IUCN).)	Chaeropus ecaudatus or C. yirratji	Interior Australia	1982 (IUCN)	Predation by feral cats and red foxes.	
1901		Delonix tomentosa	Ankara plateau, western Madagascar		Habitat fragmentation and slash and burn agriculture.	
1901	Tennessee riffleshell	Epioblasma propinqua	Tennessee, Cumberland, Wabash, and Ohio River systems, United States	1983 (IUCN)	Undetermined.	
1901		Eulophia grandidieri	Mahatsara, Toamasina, Madagascar		Undetermined.	
1901	Esperance dog weed	Opercularia acolytantha	North of Esperance, Western Australia		Undetermined.	
1901	Greater ʻamakihi	Viridonia sagittirostris	Wailuku river, Hawaiʻi Island, United States	1988 (IUCN)	Habitat destruction for sugarcane agriculture.	
1901-1902	Long-tailed hopping mouse	Notomys longicaudatus	Northwestern New South Wales, Australia	2016 (IUCN)	Predation by cats, foxes, hawks, and owls.	
1902	Pied raven	Corvus corax varius morpha leucophaeus	Faroe Islands, Denmark		Hunting.	
1902		Hunteria hexaloba	Libreville, Gabon		Habitat destruction.	
1902	Rocky Mountain locust	Melanoplus spretus	Rocky Mountains and North American Prairie	2014 (IUCN)	Breeding habitat loss due to irrigation and cattle ranching.	
1902	Auckland merganser	Mergus australis	South, Stewart, and Auckland Island, New Zealand	1910; 1988 (IUCN)	Hunting and predation by introduced animals.	
1902		Oeceoclades seychellarum	Cascade Estate, Mahé, Seychelles	1997 (IUCN)	Habitat degradation caused by human settlement and invasive plants.	
1902	North Island piopio (Note: Unconfirmed reports until 1970 (IUCN).)	Turnagra tanagra	North Island, New Zealand	1988 (IUCN)	Possibly habitat destruction, hunting, and predation by introduced cats and rats.	
1903		Agelanthus rondensis	Eastern Rondo Plateau, Tanzania		Undetermined.	
1903	Guadalupe caracara	Caracara lutosa	Guadalupe Island, Mexico	1988 (IUCN)	Extermination campaign.	
1903		Cynorkis rolfei	Vatomandry, Toamasina, Madagascar		Undetermined.	
1903	Stumptooth minnow	Stypodon signifer	Southern Coahuila, Mexico	1983 (IUCN)	Habitat degradation and pollution.	
1903–1906	Maiden's bush-pea	Pultenaea maidenii	South-western side of the Victoria Range in the Grampians, Victoria, Australia	2000	Undetermined.	
1904	Madeiran wood pigeon	Columba palumbus maderensis	Madeira, Portugal	1924	Undetermined.	
1904	Choiseul pigeon	Microgoura meeki	Choiseul, Solomon Islands	1994 (IUCN)	Predation by feral dogs and cats.	
1904		Ixodes nitens	Christmas Island, Australia		Extinction of its host, the Maclear's rat.	
1904	Maclear's rat	Rattus macleari	Christmas Island, Australia	2016 (IUCN)	Possibly disease spread by introduced black rats.	
1904	Neuchâtel charr	Salvelinus neocomensis	Lake Neuchâtel, Switzerland	2008 (IUCN)	Eutrophication caused by pollution and agriculture.	
1904		Xenopsylla nesiotes	Christmas Island, Australia		Extinction of its host, the Maclear's rat.	
1905	Japanese wolf (Note: Unconfirmed reports between 1910 and 1996.)	Canis lupus hodophilax	Honshū, Shikoku and Kyūshū, Japan		Hunting and a rabies-like epidemic.	
1905		Gibbus lyonetianus	Mauritius	1994 (IUCN)	Undetermined.	
1905	South Island piopio (Note: Unconfirmed reports until 1963 (IUCN).)	Turnagra capensis capensis	South Island, New Zealand	1988 (IUCN)	Possibly habitat destruction and predation by introduced rats.	
1906	Chatham bellbird	Anthornis melanocephala	Chatham Islands, New Zealand	1938; 1988 (IUCN)	Possibly habitat destruction, predation by rats and cats, and overhunting by collectionists.	
1906	Guadalupe flicker	Colaptes auratus rufipileus	Guadalupe Island, Mexico	1922	Habitat destruction and predation by introduced goats and cats.	
1906	Cebu blackish cuckooshrike (Note: Unconfirmed record in 2000 (Hume).)	Coracina coerulescens altera	Cebu, Philippines		Deforestation.	
1906	Cebu bar-bellied cuckooshrike (Note: Unconfirmed record in 2000 (Hume).)	Coracina striata cebuensis	Cebu, Philippines		Deforestation.	
1906	Cebu dark-throated oriole	Oriolus steerii assimilis	Cebu, Philippines		Deforestation.	
1906	South-western barred bandicoot	Perameles myosuros	Southern Western Australia, Australia	2022 (IUCN)	Predation by introduced cats and foxes.	
1907		Argocoffeopsis lemblinii	Agnieby Valley, Ivory Coast		Undetermined.	
1907	Black mamo	Drepanis funerea	Molokai and Maui, Hawaii, United States	1988 (IUCN)	Habitat destruction by introduced cattle and deer, and predation by introduced rats and mongooses.	
1907	Huia (Note: Unconfirmed sighting in 1963.)	Heteralocha acutirostris	North Island, New Zealand	1988 (IUCN)	Hunting and deforestation of old growth forests to make pastures for livestock.	
1907		Poecilobothrus majesticus	Walton-on-the-Naze, Essex, England	2022 (IUCN)	Undetermined.	
1907	Huia louse	Rallicola extinctus	North Island, New Zealand	1990	Extinction of its host.	
1908	Assumption rail	Dryolimnas cuvieri abbotti	Assumption Island, Seychelles	1937	Hunting, habitat destruction, and predation by introduced rats.	
1908	Siquijor hanging parrot	Loriculus philippensis siquijorensis	Siquijor, Philippines		Possibly deforestation and capture for the pet trade.	
1908		Persoonia laxa	Sydney's Northern Beaches, Australia	2020 (IUCN)	Probably habitat destruction.	
1908	Dawson's caribou	Rangifer tarandus dawsoni	Graham Island, British Columbia, Canada	2016 (IUCN)	Hunting, habitat loss via clearcutting, and competition with black-tailed deer. mtDNA studies suggest it is not different enough to warrant separate subspecies status.	
1908		Rhynchosia ledermannii	Bamenda Highlands, Babju, Cameroon		Deforestation caused by agriculture and firewood collection.	
1908	Alejandro Selkirk firecrown	Sephanoides fernandensis leyboldi	Alejandro Selkirk Island?, Juan Fernández Archipelago, Chile		Probably deforestation, predation and erosion caused by introduced cats, rats, goats, and rabbits, and competition of introduced plants with the nesting tree Luma apiculata.	
1908	Sloane's urania	Urania sloanus	Jamaica	1908	Habitat loss and natural disasters.	
1908	Robust white-eye	Zosterops strenuus	Lord Howe Island, Australia		1928; 1988 (IUCN)	
1909		Cyanea cylindrocalix	Hawaii, United States	2003 (IUCN)	Undetermined.	
1909		Cyrtandra olona	Wahiawa Mountains, Kauai, Hawaii, United States	2016 (IUCN)	Likely habitat degradation and predation by introduced ungulates and plants.	
1909	Cumberland leafshell	Epioblasma stewardsonii	Tennessee and Coosa River systems, United States	1983 (IUCN)	Undetermined.	
1909	Bogotá sunangel	Heliantelus zusii	Northern Andes?		Possibly deforestation.	

=== 1910s ===
Last record	Common name	Binomial name	Former range	Declared extinct	Causes	Picture
c. 1910	Oʻahu deceptor bush cricket	Leptogryllus deceptor	Oahu, Hawaii, United States		Undetermined.	
c. 1910	Yellowfin cutthroat trout	Oncorhynchus clarki macdonaldi	Twin Lakes, Colorado, United States		Hybridization with rainbow trout and competition with lake trout, both introduced.	
1910	Southwestern thick-billed grasswren	Amytornis textilis macrourus	Southwest Australia		Drought and overgrazing by livestock and introduced mammals.	
1910	Roper River scrub robin	Drymodes superciliaris colcloughi	Northern Territory, Australia		Undetermined.	
1910	Slender-billed grackle	Quiscalus palustris	Lerma River and Xochimilco, Mexico	1986 (IUCN)	Draining of marshlands.	
after 1910	Maui hau kuahiwi	Hibiscadelphus wilderianus	Maui, Hawaii, United States	1978 (IUCN)	Undetermined.	
1911	Laysan noctuid moth	Agrotis laysanensis	Laysan, Hawaii, United States		Undetermined.	
1911	Iwo Jima rail (Note: Unconfirmed sighting in 1925 (Hume).)	Amaurornis cinerea brevipes	Naka Iwo Jima and Minami Iwo Jima, Bonin Islands, Japan		Habitat clearance for agriculture and predation by introduced cats and rats.	
1911	Minute noctuid moth	Helicoverpa minuta	Hawaii, United States	1986 (IUCN)	Undetermined.	
1911	Shing-keng	Hopea shingkeng	Arbor Hills, Arunachal Pradesh, India (Note: Reports from Tibet are erroneous (IUCN).)	1998 (IUCN)	Possibly deforestation.	
1911	Laysan dropseed noctuid moth	Hypena laysanensis	Laysan, Hawaii, United States	1986 (IUCN)	Undetermined.	
1911		Rhyncogonus bryani	Laysan, Hawaii, United States	1994 (IUCN)	Habitat destruction caused by introduced rabbits grazing.	
1911	New Caledonian buttonquail	Turnix novaecaledoniae	New Caledonia		Hunting, habitat degradation and predation by introduced animals.	
1912	Maui agrotis noctuid moth	Agrotis cremata	Oahu and Maui, Hawaii, United States		Undetermined.	
1912	Procellaris agrotis noctuid moth	Agrotis procellaris	Laysan, Hawaii, United States		Undetermined.	
1912	Namoi Valley thick-billed grasswren	Amytornis textilis inexpectatus	Central New South Wales, Australia		Undetermined.	
1912	Waiautoa forget-me-not	Myosotis laingii	South Marlborough, New Zealand		Undetermined.	
1912	Guadalupe storm petrel	Oceanodroma macrodactyla	Guadalupe Island, Mexico		Predation by feral cats, and habitat degradation by goat grazing.	
1912	Bornean Baillon's crake	Porzana pusilla mira	Borneo		Deforestation?	
1912	Orkney charr	Salvelinus inframundus	Heldale Water and possibly Hoglinns Water, Hoy, Orkney	2024 (IUCN)	Possibly habitat degradation due to construction, predation or competition with introduced brown trout.	
1913	Laysan millerbird	Acrocephalus familiaris familiaris	Laysan, Hawaii, United States	1923	Habitat destruction by introduced rabbits.	
1913		Angraecum sterrophyllum	Antananarivo, Madagascar		Undetermined.	
1913	New Caledonian lorikeet (Note: Unconfirmed report in 1976 (IUCN).)	Charmosyna diadema	New Caledonia	1998	Undetermined.	
1913		Panicum pearsonii	Great Karasberg, Namibia		Undetermined.	
1913	Achatinellid land snail	Partulina montagui	Hawaii, United States	1986 (IUCN)	Undetermined.	
1914	Passenger pigeon (Note: In captivity. Last confirmed sighting in the wild in 1901. Unconfirmed sightings in the wild between 1902 and 1907.)	Ectopistes migratorius	Eastern North America	1986 (IUCN)	Hunting and habitat loss.	
1914	Laughing owl (Note: Unidentified calls heard in 1960 could be of this species.)	Ninox albifacies	New Zealand	1986 (IUCN)	Competition or predation by introduced stoats and cats.	
1914	Achatinellid land snail	Partulina crassa	Lanai, Hawaii, United States	1986 (IUCN)	Undetermined.	
1914	Guadeloupe ameiva	Pholidoscelis cineraceus	Guadeloupe and nearby islands	2015 (IUCN)	Predation by introduced mammals like mongooses.	
1914-1929	Bering cackling goose	Branta hutchinsii asiatica	Commander and Kuril Islands, Russia; possibly migratory to Japan		Hunting and predation by introduced Arctic foxes.	
c. 1915	Kenai Peninsula wolf	Canis lupus alces	Kenai Peninsula, Alaska, United States		Extermination campaign.	
1916	Tau bei qi mu	Alnus henryi	Tanshui, Taiwan		Undetermined.	
1916		Cyperus rockii	Waialae stream, western Kauai, Hawaii, United States	2016 (IUCN)	Likely invasive plants and animals.	
1916		Risiocnemis laguna	Paete, Luzon, Philippines		Urbanization.	
1917	Cayenne nightjar	Antrostomus maculosus	Northwestern French Guiana		Undetermined.	
1917		Cyanea giffardii	Glenwood, Puna, Hawaii, United States	1998 (IUCN)	Undetermined.	
1917	Waitakere scurvy grass	Lepidium amissum	Coastal Waitākere Ranges, New Zealand		Possibly artificial habitat alteration.	
1917	Maui upland damselfly	Megalagrion jugorum	Maui, Hawaii, United States	2020 (IUCN)	Undetermined.	
1917	Rodrigues day gecko	Phelsuma edwardnewtonii	Rodrigues	2015 (IUCN)	Possibly deforestation and predation by introduced rats and cats.	
1918	Dirk Hartog thick-billed grasswren	Amytornis textilis carteri	Dirk Hartog Island, Western Australia		Predation by introduced rats.	
1918	Lord Howe starling	Aplonis fusca hulliana	Lord Howe Island, Australia	1928; 1988 (IUCN)	Predation by introduced black rats.	
1918	Carolina parakeet (Note: In captivity. Last confirmed sighting in the wild in 1910, with unconfirmed reports until the 1930s (IUCN).)	Conuropsis carolinensis	Eastern and central United States	1940 (IUCN)	Hunting, habitat loss, and competition with introduced bees.	
1918	Rück's blue flycatcher	Cyornis ruckii	Medan?, Indonesia		Possibly deforestation.	
1918	Lānaʻi hookbill	Dysmorodrepanis munroi	Lana'i, Hawaii, United States	1940 (IUCN)	Habitat destruction for pineapple agriculture, and predation by introduced cats and rats.	
1918	Tarpan (Note: In captivity. Last seen in the wild in 1879 (Jezierski and Jaworski, 2008).)	Equus ferus ferus	Europe		Hunting and hybridization with domestic horses.	
1918–1952	Bernard's wolf	Canis lupus bernardi	Banks Island, Canada	1993 (IUCN)	Undetermined. (Note: It was suggested that Bernard's wolf should be merged with the extant arctic wolf or other wolves from the continent.)	
1919		Bulbophyllum minax	Fianarantsoa, Madagascar		Undetermined.	
1919	Appalachian Barbara's buttons	Marshallia grandiflora	Henderson and Polk counties, North Carolina, United States	2020	Undetermined.	

=== 1920s ===
Last record	Common name	Binomial name	Former range	Declared extinct	Causes	Picture
c. 1920	Florida black wolf	Canis rufus floridanus	Southeastern United States		Hunting and habitat loss.	
1920	True fera	Coregonus fera	Lake Geneva	2008 (IUCN)	Eutrophication and overfishing.	
1920		Euphorbia boinensis	Ankarafantsika and Mount Tsitondroina, Boeny, Madagascar		Habitat degradation by fire.	
1920-1929	Assumption Island coucal	Centropus toulou assumptionis	Assumption Island, Seychelles		Guano mining.	
1921		Euphorbia pirahazo	Ambongo and Bemarivo, Madagascar		Collection for rubber.	
1921	Astley's leiothrix	Leiothrix astleyi	China		Undetermined.	
1921		Myoporum rimatarense	Rimatara, Austral Islands, French Polynesia		Logging.	
Before 1922	Mangareva kingfisher	Todiramphus gambieri gambieri	Mangareva, Gambier Islands, French Polynesia		Undetermined.	
1922	Oahu treesnail	Achatinella lehuiensis	Lehui, Hawaii, United States	1996 (IUCN)	Undetermined.	
1922	Lilac leek-orchid	Prasophyllum colemaniarum	Bayswater, Victoria, Australia		Undetermined.	
1922	Red-moustached fruit dove	Ptilinopus mercierii	Marquesas Islands, French Polynesia	1994 (IUCN)	Predation by introduced great horned owls, rats, and cats.	
1923		Acacia kingiana	Wagin, Western Australia		Undetermined.	
1923	Kerr's noctuid moth	Agrotis kerri	French Frigate Shoals, Hawaii, United States	1996 (IUCN)	Likely habitat loss and predation by introduced ants.	
1923	Norfolk Island starling	Aplonis fusca fusca	Norfolk Island, Australia	1968; 1988 (IUCN)	Undetermined.	
1923		Bulbophyllum tampoketsense	Antananarivo, Madagascar		Overcollection and deforestation.	
1923	Laysan honeycreeper	Himatione fraithii	Laysan, Hawaii, United States	2016 (IUCN)	Habitat destruction by introduced rabbits.	
1923	Nazareno	Monteverdia lineata	Western Cuba	2010; 2020 (IUCN)	Possibly habitat degradation.	
1924	Sicilian wolf (Note: Last unconfirmed killing in 1938, and unconfirmed sighting in 1970 (Angelici & Rossi, 2018).)	Canis lupus cristaldii	Sicily, Italy		Hunting.	
1924	Round combshell	Epioblasma personata	Tennessee, Wabash, and Ohio River systems, United States		Undetermined.	
1924	Lord Howe fantail	Rhipidura fuliginosa cervina	Lord Howe Island, Australia	1928	Probably predation by introduced rats.	
1924	Lord Howe thrush	Turdus poliocephalus vinitinctus	Lord Howe Island, Australia	1999	Introduction of black rats.	
1924	California grizzly bear	Ursus arctos californicus	California, United States		Hunting. DNA evidence does not support its status as a separate subspecies.	
1925	Microreas agrotis noctuid moth	Agrotis microreas	Hawaii Island, Hawaii, United States		Undetermined.	
1925	Bubal hartebeest	Alcelaphus buselaphus buselaphus	North Africa and Southern Levant		Hunting.	
1925		Angraecum muscicolum	Tsinjoarivo, Bongolava, Madagascar		Undetermined.	
1925		Angraecum perhumile	Tsinjoarivo, Bongolava, Madagascar		Undetermined.	
1925		Angraecum rigidifolium	Mandraka, Antananarivo, Madagascar		Undetermined.	
1925		Bulbophyllum sanguineum	Toamasina, Madagascar		Undetermined.	
1925		Macledium pretoriense	Pretoria, South Africa		Urbanization.	
1926	Poko noctuid moth	Agrotis crinigera	Hawaii, United States	1996 (IUCN)	Undetermined.	
1926		Benthamia nigro-vaginata	Fianarantsoa, Madagascar		Undetermined.	
1926	Anthony's woodrat	Neotoma bryanti anthonyi	Isla Todos Santos, Mexico	2008 (IUCN)	Predation by feral cats.	
1927	Thick-billed ground dove	Alopecoenas salamonis	Solomon Islands	2005 (IUCN)	Probably habitat destruction, hunting, and predation by introduced cats and rats.	
1927	Caucasian wisent	Bison bonasus caucasicus	Caucasus Mountains	1988 (IUCN)	Hunting. Hybrid descendants exist in captivity, and have been reintroduced to the wild.	
1927	Snake River sucker	Chasmistes muriei	Snake River, United States		Hybridization with the Utah sucker after dams changed the river's flow.	
1927	Syrian wild ass	Equus hemionus hemippus	Near East		Hunting.	
1927	Bia	Exyrias volcanus	Taal Lake, Philippines		Overfishing, pollution, habitat degradation, and invasive species among others.	
1927	Confused moth	Helicoverpa confusa	Hawaii, United States	1986 (IUCN)	Undetermined.	
1927	Hawaii yellowwood	Ochrosia kilaueaensis	Hawaiʻi, Hawaii, United States	2020 (IUCN)	Habitat degradation by introduced plants, goats, and fires.	
1927	Samar Bay owl	Phodilus badius riverae	Samar Island, Philippines		Undetermined.	
1927		Pseudophilautus malcolmsmithi	Sri Lanka	2004 (IUCN)	Habitat loss.	
1927		Pseudophilautus rugatus	Taralanda, Sri Lanka	2004 (IUCN)	Possibly habitat loss due to agriculture.	
1927		Pseudophilautus zimmeri	Point de Galle, Sri Lanka	2004 (IUCN)	Urbanization.	
1927	Yellow-bellied goby	Silhouettea flavoventris	Taal Lake, Philippines		Overfishing, pollution, habitat degradation, and invasive species among others.	
1927	Cry pansy	Viola cryana	Cry, Yonne, France	2011 (IUCN)	Overcollection by botanists and limestone quarrying.	
1927-1928	Paradise parrot	Psephotellus pulcherrimus	Eastern Australia	1994 (IUCN)	Probably habitat degradation.	
1928		Bulbophyllum hirsutiusculum	Fianarantsoa, Madagascar		Undetermined.	
1928	Utah Lake sculpin	Cottus echinatus	Utah Lake, Utah, United States		Increased water pollution and salinity caused by agriculture, and introduced fishes. The last individuals may have been killed by drought in the 1930s.	
1928		Cyanea arborea	Northwestern Haleakala, Maui, Hawaii, United States	1998 (IUCN)	Undetermined.	
1928	Lord Howe gerygone	Gerygone insularis	Lord Howe Island, Australia	1936; 1988 (IUCN)	Predation by introduced rats.	
1928	Eastwood's long-tailed seps	Tetradactylus eastwoodae	Limpopo, South Africa	1996 (IUCN)	Habitat loss.	
1928	Nullarbor barred bandicoot	Perameles papillon	Nullarbor Plain, Australia	2025 (IUCN)	Predation by feral cats and red foxes, habitat degradation, and changes in the fire regime.	
1929		Acalypha wilderi	Northwestern Rarotonga, Cook Islands	2014 (IUCN)	Deforestation for agriculture and housing development. Doubts exist about it being distinct from still living A. raivavensis and A. tubuaiensis; if indeed the same, the older name A. wilderi prevails.	
1929	St. Kitts bullfinch	Melopyrrha grandis	Saint Kitts	1972	Deforestation?	
1929	Makira woodhen (Note: Unconfirmed report in 2002 (Hume, 2017).)	Pareudiastes silvestris	Makira, Solomon Islands		Probably predation by introduced cats and rats.	
1929		Scleria chevalieri	Western Senegal	2020 (IUCN)	Draining of wetland habitat.	
1929	Mount Holland thomasia	Thomasia gardneri	Near Mount Holland, Western Australia		Undetermined.	

=== 1930s ===
Last record	Common name	Binomial name	Former range	Declared extinct	Causes	Picture
c. 1930	Western rufous bristlebird	Dasyornis broadbenti littoralis	Southwestern Australia		Burning of shrublands for pasture and predation by introduced cats.	
c. 1930	New Zealand grayling	Prototroctes oxyrhynchus	New Zealand	1986 (IUCN)	Possibly over-exploitation, deterioration of the freshwater habitat through clearance of forest cover resulting in increased light penetration, raised water temperature, and invasive salmonids.	
1930–1939		Centaurea pseudoleucolepis	Kammenye Mogily, Donetsk, Ukraine	2011 (IUCN)	Undetermined. Possibly a hybrid rather than a valid species.	
1930–1939	Tahiti rail	Hypotaenidia pacifica	Tahiti and Mehetia?, French Polynesia	1988 (IUCN)	Probably predation by introduced cats and rats.	
1930–1939	Nuku Hiva monarch (Note: Unconfirmed sightings in 1975 (IUCN).)	Pomarea nukuhivae	Nuku Hiva, Marquesas Islands, French Polynesia	1974; 2004 (IUCN)	Probably habitat destruction and predation by introduced species.	
1930	Amastrid land snails	Carelia anceophila	Olokele Trail, Kauai, Hawaii, United States	1990 (IUCN)	Undetermined.	
1930	Amastrid land snails	Carelia cumingiana	Hawaii, United States	1990 (IUCN)	Undetermined.	
1930	Amastrid land snails	Carelia glossema	Olokele, Kauai, Hawaii, United States	1990 (IUCN)	Undetermined.	
1930	Amastrid land snails	Carelia knudseni	Kauai, Hawaii, United States	1990 (IUCN)	Undetermined.	
1930	Amastrid land snails	Carelia paradoxa	Kauai, Hawaii, United States	1990 (IUCN)	Undetermined.	
1930	Amastrid land snails	Carelia periscelis	Kauai, Hawaii, United States	1990 (IUCN)	Undetermined.	
1930	Amastrid land snails	Carelia tenebrosa	Kauai, Hawaii, United States	1990 (IUCN)	Undetermined.	
1930	Amastrid land snails	Carelia turricula	Kauai, Hawaii, United States	1990 (IUCN)	Undetermined.	
1930	St Kilda house mouse	Mus musculus muralis	St Kilda, Scotland		Complete evacuation of St Kilda's human population, which it depended on.	
1930	Darwin's Galápagos mouse	Nesoryzomys darwini	Santa Cruz, Galápagos Islands, Ecuador	1994 (IUCN)	Competition, predation, and exotic pathogens from introduced black rats.	
1930	Silver trout	Salvelinus agassizi	Dublin Pond and Christine Lake, New Hampshire, United States	1986 (IUCN)	Overfishing and introduction of exotic fish.	
1931	Roque Chico de Salmor giant lizard	Gallotia simonyi simonyi	Roque Chico de Salmor, off El Hierro, Canary Islands		Hunting and capture for the exotic pet trade.	
1931	Lesser bilby (Note: Date of last collection. Aboriginal Australians claimed it survived until around 1960, and a skull estimated to be over 15 years old was found in an owl nest in 1967 (IUCN).)	Macrotis leucura	Deserts of Australia	1982 (IUCN)	Probably predation by introduced cats and red foxes, and changes to the fire regime.	
1931	Stephens Island ground beettle	Mecodema punctellum	Stephens Island, New Zealand	1994 (IUCN)	Possibly forest clearance.	
1931	Bunker's woodrat	Neotoma bryanti bunkeri	Coronados Islands, Mexico	2008 (IUCN)	Depletion of food resources and predation by feral cats.	
1932		Angraecum mahavense	Ambohipiraka, Antsiranana, Madagascar		Undetermined.	
1932	Roosevelt's giant anole	Anolis roosevelti	Virgin Islands		Possibly deforestation.	
1932		Euphrasia mendoncae	Bragança, Portugal	2011 (IUCN)	Undetermined. Could be synonimous with E. minima.	
1932	Lake Mackay hare-wallaby	Lagorchestes asomatus	Between Mount Farewell and Lake Mackay, Northern Territory; possibly Great Sandy, Gibson, and Tanami Deserts	1982 (IUCN)	Predation by introduced cats and red foxes, possibly also changes to the fire regime after the removal of the Australian aboriginal population.	
1932	Western Lewin's rail	Lewinia pectoralis clelandii	Southwest Australia	1980s	Drainage and burning of wetlands for agriculture and settlement.	
1932	Natuna Bay owl	Phodilus badius arixuthus	Bunguran Island, Indonesia		Undetermined.	
1932	Heath hen	Tympanuchus cupido cupido	East Coast of the United States		Hunting, predation by feral cats, wildfires, and histomoniasis transmitted by domestic poultry.	
before 1933		Zonites siphnicus	Sifnos, Sikinos, and Folegandros, Greece	2017 (IUCN)	Undetermined.	
1933	Desert bettong	Bettongia anhydra	Tanami Desert and Nullarbor Plain, Australia	2016 (IUCN)	Probably predation by feral cats and foxes, and changes to the fire regime.	
1933	Wolseley conebush	Leucadendron spirale	Breede River Valley, South Africa	2020 (IUCN)	Habitat destruction for timber plantations and agriculture, competition with invasive plants.	
1933	Lesser stick-nest rat (Note: Unconfirmed sightings between 1970 and 2008 (IUCN).)	Leporillus apicalis	Central Australia	2016 (IUCN)	Predation by introduced species and habitat destruction for agriculture.	
1933		Pseudophilautus eximius	Dimbula, Sri Lanka	2004 (IUCN)	Possibly habitat loss.	
1933		Rhipidoglossum orientalis	Nguru Mountains, Tanzania		Undetermined.	
1933		Tridactyle sarcodantha	Uluguru Mountains, Tanzania		Deforestation for agriculture.	
1934	Lost shark	Carcharhinus obsoletus	Southern South China Sea		Fishing.	
1934		Delissea subcordata	Koʻolau Mountains, Oahu, Hawaii, United States	2015 (IUCN)	Likely invasive weeds, ungulates, rats, and slugs.	
1934	Hawaiʻi ʻōʻō	Moho nobilis	Hawaiʻi Island, Hawaii, United States	1988 (IUCN)	Possibly habitat loss and disease.	
1934	Indefatigable Galápagos mouse	Nesoryzomys indefessus	Santa Cruz and Baltra, Galápagos Islands, Ecuador	2002 (IUCN)	Introduction of black rats.	
1934	Aguelmame Sidi Ali trout	Salmo pallaryi	Lake Aguelmame Sidi Ali, Morocco	2006 (IUCN)	Introduction of the common carp.	
1935	Desert rat-kangaroo (Note: Unconfirmed sightings between 1977 and 2011 (IUCN).)	Caloprymnus campestris	Central Australia	1994 (IUCN)	Predation by introduced red foxes and cats.	
1935	Mogollon mountain wolf	Canis lupus mogollonensis	Arizona, United States		Hunting. (Note: The subspecific differences between the Mogollon mountain wolf, Southern Rocky Mountain wolf, and surviving Great Plains wolf and Mexican wolf have been denied on morphological grounds.)	
1935	Southern Rocky Mountain wolf	Canis lupus youngi	Southern Rocky Mountains		Hunting.	
1935		Lepisanthes unilocularis	Seashore of Foluo, southwest Hainan, China	1998 (IUCN)	Undetermined.	
1935	Ratas Island lizard	Podarcis lilfordi rodriquezi	Ratas Island off Mahón, Gymensian Islands, Spain		Explosion of Ratas Island during the rebuilding of Port Mahon.	
1935		Senecio navugabensis	Lake Navugabo, southwestern Uganda		Undetermined.	
1935		Triaspis schliebeni	Lake Lutamba, Lindi District, Tanzania		Possibly habitat loss caused by agriculture.	
1935		Uvaria decidua	Mlinguru, south of Lindi, Tanzania		Undetermined.	
1936	Ryukyu wood pigeon	Columba jouyi	Ryukyu, Japan	1988 (IUCN)	Possibly deforestation.	
1936	Virgin Islands screech owl (Note: Unconfirmed reports in 1985 (Hume, 2017).)	Megascops nudipes newtoni	Virgin Islands		Deforestation for agriculture.	
1936	Thylacine (Note: In captivity (IUCN). Last dated in New Guinea in 3050 BCE, in mainland Australia in 1277-1229 BCE, and in Tasmania in 1931. Unconfirmed sightings between 1937 and 2000.)	Thylacinus cynocephalus	Australia and New Guinea	1983 (IUCN)	Competition with humans and dingos, extermination campaign (in Tasmania).	
1936	Raiatean banded tree snail	Partula cuneata	Raiatea, Society Islands, French Polynesia	1994 (IUCN)	Predation by introduced rosy wolfsnails.	
1936	Pohnpei ground partula snail	Partula guamensis	Pohnpei, Micronesia	2024 (IUCN)	Predation by the introduced flatworm Platydemus manokwari, brown rats, black rats, Polynesian rats, and rosy wolfsnails.	
1937		Delissea sinuata	Oʻahu, Hawaii, United States	2025 (IUCN)	Invasive species.	
1937		Neostethus ctenophorus	Laguna de Bay, Luzon, Philippines		Likely pollution.	
1937	Bali tiger (Note: Unconfirmed sighting in 1972 (Rossi, 2020).)	Panthera tigris balica	Bali, Indonesia		Hunting and habitat loss. (Note: Genetics do not support a subspecific differentiation with the living Sumatran tiger.)	
1937	Lānaʻi ʻalauahio	Paroreomyza montana montana	Lana'i, Hawaii, United States	1937	Habitat degradation.	
1937	Marquesas swamphen	Porphyrio paepae	Hiva Oa and Tahuata, Marquesas, French Polynesia	2014 (IUCN)	Probably hunting and predation by rats and cats.	
c. 1937		Barbus microbarbis	Lake Luhondo, Rwanda	2006 (IUCN)	Possibly predation by introduced Tilapia and Haplochromis in the 1950s.	
1938	Oahu treesnail	Achatinella spaldingi	Waianae Mountains, Hawaii, United States	1990 (IUCN)	Undetermined.	
1938		Acianthus ledwardii	Burleigh Heads, Queensland, Australia		Undetermined.	
1938		Banara wilsonii	Puerto Padre, Cuba	2020 (IUCN)	Habitat destruction for sugarcane cultivation.	
1938	McGregor's house finch	Carpodacus mexicanus mcgregori	San Benito Island, Mexico		Undetermined.	
1938		Colparion madgei	Mauritius	1994 (IUCN)	Undetermined.	
1938	Tobias' caddisfly	Hydropsyche tobiasi	Main River and the Rhine up to Cologne, Germany	1983 (IUCN)	Pollution.	
1938	Grand Cayman oriole (Note: Unconfirmed sighting in 1967 (Hume, 2017).)	Icterus leucopteryx bairdi	Grand Cayman, Cayman Islands		Deforestation.	
1938	Pahranagat spinedace	Lepidomeda altivelis	Pahranagat Valley, Nevada, United States	1986 (IUCN)	Competition and predation by introduced common carps, mosquitofish, and American bullfrogs.	
1938	Bougainville black-faced pitta	Pitta anerythra pallida	Bougainville Island, Papua-New Guinea		Undetermined.	
1938	Eastern cougar (Note: Unconfirmed sighting in 1992. Bolgiano, C. & Roberts, J. (2005) The Eastern Cougar: Historic Accounts, Scientific Investigations, and New Evidence. Stackpole Books, 246 pages.)	Puma concolor couguar	Eastern North America	2011	Hunting. (Note: Genetics do not support subspecies differentiation between the eastern cougar and living cougars in Florida and Western North America; if placed under a single subspecies, this would have the name P. c. couguar because of being older.)	
1938	Little spotted kiwi louse	Rallicola pilgrimi	New Zealand		Parasite of the little spotted kiwi, extinct when the last birds were relocated to predator-free islands as part of conservation efforts.	
1938	Grass Valley speckled dace	Rhynichthys osculus reliquus	Lander County, Nevada, United States		Introduction of the rainbow trout.	
1938	Daito varied tit	Sittiparus varius orii	Kitadaitōjima, Okinawa, Japan	1984–1986	Habitat destruction for agriculture and military infrastructure.	
1938	Schomburgk's deer (Note: In captivity. Last seen in the wild in 1932 (IUCN).)	Rucervus schomburgki	Central Thailand	1994 (IUCN)	Hunting.	
1938	Grand Cayman thrush	Turdus ravidus	Grand Cayman, Cayman Islands	1965; 1988 (IUCN)	Probably habitat loss.	
1938	Mount Kenya potto	Perodicticus ibeanus stockleyi	Mount Kenya, Kenya		Most likely habitat loss for agriculture.	
1939		Cyperus chionocephalus	Ethiopia		Livestock grazing, firewood collection, and agriculture.	
1939	New Caledonian nightjar	Eurostopodus exul	Northwestern New Caledonia		Undetermined.	
1939	Toolache wallaby (Note: In captivity. Last confirmed wild sighting in 1924; unconfirmed sightings between 1943 and the 1970s (IUCN).)	Notamacropus greyi	Southeastern Australia	1983 (IUCN)	Habitat loss to agriculture, hunting, and predation by introduced red fox.	
1939		Roystonea stellata	Baracoa, eastern Cuba	2020 (IUCN)	Habitat destruction for coffee cultivation.	

=== 1940s ===
Last record	Common name	Binomial name	Former range	Declared extinct	Causes	Picture
c. 1940	Sugarspoon	Epioblasma arcaeformis	Cumberland and Tennessee river systems, United States	1983 (IUCN)	Damming.	
1940	Lesser ʻakialoa	Akialoa obscura	Hawaiʻi Island, Hawaii, United States	1994 (IUCN)	Possibly deforestation and introduced disease-carrying mosquitos.	
1940	Cascade mountain wolf	Canis lupus fuscus	Continental Cascadia		Hunting.	
1940	Cape Verde giant skink (Note: In captivity. Last recorded in the wild in 1915 (Mateo et al., 2020). Unconfirmed recent remains found in 2005 (IUCN).)	Chioninia coctei	Western Barlavento Islands, Cape Verde	1996 (IUCN)	Hunting, capture for the exotic pet trade, predation by feral dogs and cats.	
1940		Pseudophilautus dimbullae	Dimbula, Sri Lanka	2004 (IUCN)	Possibly habitat loss.	
1940	Las Vegas dace	Rhinichthys deaconi	Las Vegas Valley, Nevada, United States	1965; 1986 (IUCN)	Habitat destruction.	
1940	Javan lapwing (Note: Unconfirmed record in 2002 (Hume).)	Vanellus macropterus	Java, Indonesia		Hunting and habitat loss to agriculture.	
1940-1949	Cebu white-bellied woodpecker	Dryocopus javensis cebuensis	Cebu, Philippines		Deforestation.	
1940-1949	Lord Howe boobook	Ninox novaeseelandiae albaria	Lord Howe Island, Australia		Deforestation, predation by introduced black rats, and predation or competition with southern boobooks, barn owls, and masked owls (all introduced to control the invasive rat population).	
1940-1949		Stellaria elatinoides	New Zealand		Habitat destruction and possibly invasive weeds.	
c. 1941	Arabian ostrich (Note: Unconfirmed sighting in 1966 (Boug & Islam, 2018).)	Struthio camelus syriacus	Arabian Peninsula and the Near East		Hunting.	
1941	Mukojima white-eye	Apalopteron familiare familiare	Mukojima, Nakodo-jima, and probably Chichi-jima, Bonin Islands		Deforestation.	
1941	Xerces blue	Glaucopsyche xerces	San Francisco Peninsula, California, United States	1996 (IUCN)	The absence of Lotus and Lupinus plants in the area due to human development.	
1942		Angraecum serpens	Toamasina, Madagascar		Undetermined.	
1942	Texas gray wolf	Canis lupus monstrabilis	Texas, United States		Hunting. (Note: The Texas gray wolf has been at times included within either the living Great Plains wolf or the Mexican wolf on morphological grounds.)	
1942		Hymenodictyon seyrigii	Toliara, Madagascar		Habitat destruction caused by graphite mining and wildfires.	
1942	Moss-land silver-studded blue	Plebejus argus masseyi	Lancashire and Cumbria, England		Undetermined.	
1942		Polystachya rugosilabia	Nguru Mountains, Tanzania		Habitat loss to cardamom cultivation.	
1942	Chapin's crombec	Sylvietta leucophrys chapini	Lendu Plateau, Democratic Republic of the Congo		Deforestation.	
1942	Norfolk triller	Lalage leucopyga leucopyga	Norfolk Island, Australia	1999	Habitat loss and predation by introduced black rats.	
1943		Eriocaulon inundatum	Senegal coast	2020 (IUCN)	Habitat destruction for salt mining.	
1943	Cebu hanging parrot (Note: In captivity. Last confirmed sighting in the wild in 1929, a dubious one in 2004 (Hume, 2017).)	Loriculus philippensis chrysonotus	Cebu, Philippines		Deforestation.	
1943	Barbary lion (Note: Unconfirmed sighting in 1956 (Rossi, 2020).)	Panthera leo leo	North Africa		Habitat loss from desertification and human activities, followed by extermination campaign. (Note: Hybrid descendants are believed to exist in captivity. However, genetics do not support subspecies differentiation with living wild lions in Asia, West and Central Africa, which would be named P. l. leo if placed within a single subspecies.)	
1943	Desert bandicoot (Note: Unconfirmed sightings in the 1960s (IUCN).)	Perameles eremiana	Central Australia	1982 (IUCN)	Predation by cats and foxes, competition with European rabbits, and changes to the fire regime after the British colonization of Australia.	
1943		Polystachya acuminata	Usambara Mountains, Tanzania		Deforestation for logging and agriculture.	
1943–1962		Polystachya canaliculata	Nguru Mountains, Tanzania		Deforestation.	
1944	American ivory-billed woodpecker (Note: Unconfirmed recordings in 2008.)	Campephilus principalis principalis	Southern United States		Logging and hunting.	
1944		Disperis egregia	East Usambara Mountains, Tanzania		Habitat degradation caused by logging and the invasive umbrella tree (Maesopsis eminii).	
1944	Bismarck red-necked crake	Rallina tricolor convicta	New Ireland and New Hannover islands, Bismarck Archipelago, Papua New Guinea		Undetermined.	
1944–1945	Laysan rail	Zapornia palmeri	Laysan, Hawaii, United States	1988 (IUCN)	Habitat destruction by introduced rabbits and guinea pigs, and predation by introduced rats.	
1944-1947	Aruba amazon	Amazona barbadensis canifrons	Aruba		Persecution by farmers and exotic pet trade.	
Before 1945	Amastrid land snails	Carelia lirata	Kauai, Hawaii, United States		Undetermined.	
Before 1945	Amastrid land snails	Carelia mirabilis	Kauai, Hawaii, United States		Undetermined.	
Before 1945	Amastrid land snails	Carelia necra	Kauai, Hawaii, United States		Undetermined.	
Before 1945	Amastrid land snails	Carelia pilsbryi	Kauai, Hawaii, United States		Undetermined.	
Before 1945	Achatinellid land snails	Perdicella fulgurans	East Maui, Hawaii, United States		Undetermined.	
Before 1945	Achatinellid land snails	Perdicella maniensis	West Maui, Hawaii, United States		Undetermined.	
Before 1945	Achatinellid land snails	Perdicella zebra	East Maui, Hawaii, United States		Undetermined.	
Before 1945	Achatinellid land snails	Perdicella zebrina	East Maui, Hawaii, United States		Undetermined.	
1945	Oahu treesnail	Achatinella papyracea	Oahu, Hawaii, United States	1990 (IUCN)	Undetermined.	
1945	Cyprus dipper	Cinclus cinclus olympicus	Cyprus		Undetermined.	
1945	Wake Island rail	Hypotaenidia wakensis	Wake Island, United States	1988 (IUCN)	Hunting and destruction caused by fighting in World War II.	
After 1945	Oahu treesnail	Achatinella juncea	Koolau Mountains, Hawaii, United States		Undetermined.	
1946	Amastrid land snail	Amastra subsoror	West Maui, Hawaii, United States		Undetermined.	
1946		Argyroxiphium virescens (Note: Hybrid descendants survived until 1996 (IUCN).)	Haleakalā crater, Maui, Hawaii, United States	2003 (IUCN)	Predation by introduced goats, pigs, and cattle.	
1946	Achatinellid land snail	Auriculella uniplicata	West Maui, Hawaii, United States		Undetermined.	
1946		Cyanea sessilifolia	Ko'olau Mountains, Oahu, Hawaii, United States	2016 (IUCN)	Competition with introduced plants, habitat degradation and predation by introduced animals.	
1946	Mount Alifana partula (Note: Survival to the early 1980s proposed on the basis of empty shells found in 1989 (IUCN).)	Partula salifana	Guam, United States	1994 (IUCN)	Predation by introduced rosy wolfsnails and New Guinea flatworms.	
1946	Pallid beach mouse	Peromyscus polionotus decoloratus	Volusia and Flagler Counties, Florida, United States		Habitat loss.	
1946	Emma's giant rat	Uromys emmae	Owi Island, Indonesia		Undetermined.	
1947		Cyrtandra crenata	Koolau Mountains, Oahu, Hawaii, United States		Habitat degradation by introduced pigs and goats, predation by introduced rats, slugs, and snails; and competition with introduced plants.	
1947		Mimosa kitrokala	Taolagnaro, southeastern Madagascar		Undetermined.	
1947		Pseudophilautus zal	Sri Lanka	2004 (IUCN)	Possibly habitat loss due to agriculture.	
1948	Ash Meadows killifish	Empetrichthys merriami	Ash Meadows, Nevada, United States	1986 (IUCN)	Predation by introduced American Bullfrogs and red swamp crayfish.	
1948–1949	Pink-headed duck (Note: Unconfirmed sighting in 2011 (IUCN).)	Rhodonessa caryophyllacea	Northeast India, Bangladesh, and northern Myanmar		Trophy hunting and habitat loss to agriculture.	
1949	Sinú parakeet	Pyrrhura subandina	Sinú Valley, Córdoba, Colombia		Possibly hunting and habitat loss.	

=== 1950s ===
Last record	Common name	Binomial name	Former range	Declared extinct	Causes	Picture
c. 1950	Little Swan Island hutia	Geocapromys thoracatus	Little Swan Island, Honduras	1996 (IUCN)	Introduced rats.	
1950		Dorstenia bicaudata	East Usambara and Uluguru Mountains, Tanzania		Undetermined.	
1950		Lepidium obtusatum	Coastal Waitākere Ranges and Wellington, New Zealand		Habitat destruction as a consequence of gravel extraction, weed invasion, and overcollection by botanists.	
1950	Hokkaidō otter	Lutra lutra whiteleyi	Hokkaidō and southern Kuril Islands		Hunting.	
1950		Sanicula kauaiensis	Kauai, Hawaii, United States	2016 (IUCN)	Likely introduced plants and animals.	
1950		Stereospermum zenkeri	Yaounde, Cameroon		Urbanization.	
1950–1959	Negros spotted imperial pigeon	Ducula carola nigrorum	Negros and Siquijor, Philippines		Undetermined.	
1950–1959		Eriocaulon jordanii	Sierra Leone coast	2020 (IUCN)	Possibly habitat destruction for rice cultivation.	
1950–1959	White-headed Polynesian ground dove	Pampusana erythroptera albicollis	Hao, Hiti, and possibly Tahanea, French Polynesia		Predation by introduced cats and rats.	
1950–1959	San Martín Island woodrat	Neotoma bryanti martinensis	Isla San Martín, Mexico	2008 (IUCN)	Predation by feral cats.	
1950–1959	Amirante turtle dove	Nesoenas picturata aldabrana	Amirante Islands, Seychelles		Hybridization with the Malagasy turtle dove.	
1950–1959	Moroccan guineafowl	Numida meleagris sabyi	Between the Oum er Rbia and Sebou rivers of Morocco		Habitat destruction and hunting.	
1950–1959		Tristramella magdelainae	Damascus, Syria	2006 (IUCN)	Possibly drought, pollution, and water extraction.	
1950–1959	Tawi-tawi buttonquail	Turnix sylvaticus suluensis	Jolo and Tawi-tawi, Sulu, Philippines		Possibly deforestation and predation by introduced animals.	
1951	Oahu treesnail	Achatinella valida	Koolau Mountains, Hawaii, United States	1990 (IUCN)	Undetermined.	
1951		Afrocyclops pauliani	Antananarivo, Madagascar	1996 (IUCN)	Undetermined.	
1951	Amastrid land snails	Amastra crassilabrum	Oahu, Hawaii, United States	1994 (IUCN)	Undetermined.	
1951	Amastrid land snails	Carelia kalalauensis	Kauai, Hawaii, United States	1990 (IUCN)	Undetermined.	
1951		Cynorkis sylvatica	Marivorahona, Antsiranana, Madagascar		Undetermined.	
1951	Queen of Sheba's gazelle	Gazella bilkis	Taiz, Yemen		Hunting.	
1951		Podocarpus perrieri	Eastern coast of Madagascar		Deforestation.	
1951	Japanese sea lion (Note: Unconfirmed sightings in 1974 and 1975 (IUCN).)	Zalophus japonicus	Japanese Islands and Korea	1994 (IUCN)	Hunting for blubber and oil, and commercial fishing.	
1952	Oahu treesnail	Achatinella elegans	Koolau Mountains, Hawaii, United States	1996 (IUCN)	Undetermined.	
1952	Niceforo's pintail	Anas georgica niceforoi	Central Colombia		Possibly hunting and habitat degradation.	
1952	Amastrid land snails	Carelia cochlea	Kalihiwai, Hawaii, United States	1990 (IUCN)	Undetermined.	
1952	Amastrid land snails	Carelia dolei	Kauai, Hawaii, United States	1990 (IUCN)	Undetermined.	
1952	Amastrid land snails	Carelia evelynae	Kauai, Hawaii, United States	1990 (IUCN)	Undetermined.	
1952	Amastrid land snails	Carelia olivacea	Kauai, Hawaii, United States		Undetermined.	
1952	Deepwater cisco	Coregonus johannae	Lakes Michigan and Huron	1986 (IUCN)	Overfishing, predation by introduced lampreys, and hybridization with more common ciscoes.	
1952	Caribbean monk seal (Note: Unconfirmed sighting in 1962.)	Neomonachus tropicalis	Caribbean Sea, Bahamas, and Gulf of Mexico	1994 (IUCN); 2005	Hunting for meat, blubber and oil, and habitat destruction from commercial fishing.	
1952	San Benedicto rock wren	Salpinctes obsoletus exsul	San Benedicto, Revillagigedo Islands, Mexico		Eruption of the El Boquerón vent.	
1952	New Mexico sharp-tailed grouse	Tympanuchus phasianellus hueyi	New Mexico (and Colorado?), United States		Aridification and habitat destruction.	
1953	Ilin Island cloudrunner (Note: In Ilin. Last dated in Mindoro in 50 BCE (Louys et al., 2021).)	Crateromys paulus	Mindoro and Ilin Islands, Philippines		Deforestation?	
1953	Raycraft Ranch killifish	Empetrichthys latos concavus	Pahrump Valley, Nevada, United States		Predation by introduced carps and bullfrogs.	
1953		Faramea chiapensis	Selva Negra, Chiapas, Mexico	2020 (IUCN)	Deforestation for agriculture.	
1953		Plectranthus scopulicola	West Usambara, Tanzania		Possibly habitat loss caused by agriculture.	
1953	Negros fruit dove	Ptilinopus arcanus	Negros Island, Philippines		Deforestation?	
1953		Schizothorax saltans	Talas River basin, Kazakhstan	2020 (IUCN)	Water extraction, pollution, and fisheries.	
1954	Maravillas red shiner	Cyprinella lutrensis blairi	Maravillas Creek, Texas, United States	1987	Introduction of plains killifish.	
1954	Plateau chub	Evarra eigenmanni	Chalco and Xochimilco-Tlahuac channels, Valley of Mexico	1986 (IUCN)	Habitat destruction and pollution.	
1954	Adams mistletoe	Trilepidea adamsii	From the Waipoua River to the Waikato and Coromandel Peninsula in the North Island; Great Barrier Island, and Waiheke Island, New Zealand		Possibly habitat loss, over-collecting, loss of pollinators and dispersers, and predation by introduced common brushtail possums.	
1955	Beyşehir bleak	Alburnus akili	Lake Beyşehir, Turkey	2006 (IUCN)	Predation by introduced zanders and possibly hybridization with the Sakarya bleak.	
1955		Aspidostemon inconspicuus	Menagisy forest, Toamasina, Madagascar		Deforestation caused by slash-and-burn agriculture.	
1955	Itombwe nightjar (Note: Unconfirmed recording in 1997 (Hume, 2017).)	Caprimulgus prigoginei	Central Africa?		Deforestation?	
1955	Goff's pocket gopher	Geomys pinetis goffi	Eastern Florida, United States		Habitat destruction.	
1956	Coosa elktoe	Alasmidonta mccordi	Coosa River, Alabama, United States	2000 (IUCN)	Impoundment of the Coosa River.	
1956	Gong shan hua	Betula gynoterminalis	Drungzu Nusu Zizhixian, near Gongshan, China		Possibly forest clearing and habitat loss.	
1956	Imperial woodpecker	Campephilus imperialis	North-Central Mexico		Hunting and habitat loss.	
1956	Levuana moth	Levuana iridescens	Viti Levu, Fiji	1994 (IUCN)	Introduction of the parasitic fly Bessa remota by coconut farmers, as a form of biological pest control. (Note: However, it's been argued that L. iridescens was not actually native to Fiji and that lack of post-1956 records is the result of diminished enthomological research after Fiji's independence.)	
1956	Crescent nail-tail wallaby	Onychogalea lunata	Western and central Australia	1982 (IUCN)	Predation by introduced foxes and feral cats, human-induced habitat degradation.	
1957		Cyanea copelandii ssp. copelandii	Southeastern Mauna Loa, Hawaii, United States	2003 (IUCN)	Predation by introduced rats and ungulates, and extinction of its pollinators, the Hawaiian honeycreepers.	
1957		Cyanea linearifolia	Wahiawa Mountains, Kauai, Hawaii, United States	2016 (IUCN)	Probably invasive species.	
1957		Disperis bosseri	Ankaratra, Antananarivo, Madagascar		Undetermined.	
1957	Thicktail chub	Gila crassicauda	California Central Valley and San Francisco Bay, United States	1986 (IUCN)	Habitat destruction for agriculture and introduced fish.	
1957	Diels' currant bush	Leptomeria dielsiana	Scott River, Western Australia		Undetermined.	
1957	Scioto madtom	Noturus trautmani	Big Darby Creek, Ohio, United States	2013 (IUCN)	Undetermined.	
1957	Hainan ormosia	Ormosia howii	Hainan and Guangdong, China	1998 (IUCN)	Possibly deforestation for agriculture.	
1957	Puebla deer mouse	Peromyscus mekisturus	Puebla, Mexico		Habitat destruction due to agriculture or climate change.	
1958	Oahu treesnail	Achatinella juddii	Koolau Mountains, Hawaii, United States	1996 (IUCN)	Undetermined.	
1958	New Britain thicketbird	Cincloramphus grosvenori	New Britain, Papua New Guinea		Undetermined.	
1958	Pahrump Ranch poolfish	Empetrichthys latos pahrump	Nye County, Nevada, United States		Habitat destruction by excessive water pumping.	
1958	Blue walleye	Sander vitreus glaucus	Lake Erie, Ontario, and Niagara River	1983	Overfishing and hybridization with walleye.	
1959		Acalypha dikuluwensis	Katanga Copperbelt, Democratic Republic of the Congo	2012 (IUCN)	Habitat destruction caused by surface mining.	
1959		Aeranthes albidiflora	Fianarantsoa, Madagascar		Undetermined.	
1959	Rennell Island teal	Anas gibberifrons remissa	Rennell Island, Solomon Islands		Competition with introduced Tilapia.	

=== 1960s ===
Last record	Common name	Binomial name	Former range	Declared extinct	Causes	Picture
1960	New Caledonian owlet-nightjar (Note: Unconfirmed sightings and calls heard in 1998 (IUCN).)	Aegotheles savesi	Southwestern New Caledonia		Undetermined.	
1960	Achatinellid land snail	Auriculella expansa	West Maui, Hawaii, United States		Undetermined.	
1960	Superb cyanea	Cyanea superba ssp. regina	Koolau Mountains, Oahu, Hawaii, United States	1998 (IUCN)	Competition with introduced plants and predation by feral pigs.	
1960	Candango mouse	Juscelinomys candango	Brasília, Brazil	2008 (IUCN)	Urban sprawl.	
1960-1969	Savoy whitefish	Coregonus bezola	Lac du Bourget, France	2008 (IUCN)	Eutrophication of the lake caused by pollution.	
1960-1969	Techirghiol stickleback	Gasterosteus crenobiontus	Lake Techirghiol, Romania	2008 (IUCN)	Hybridization with the three-spined stickleback; the springs it inhabited were separated from the latter's habitat by a hypersaline lake acting as barrier between the species, until irrigation works transformed the lake into a brackish one that was invaded by migratory three-spined sticklebacks.	
1960-1969		Pantanodon madagascariensis	Mahambo, Madagascar	2004 (IUCN)	Introduced Gambusia.	
1960-1969	Syr Darya sturgeon	Pseudoscaphirhynchus fedtschenkoi	Syr Darya river		Draining of the Aral Sea.	
1961	Northern white-winged apalis	Apalis chariessa chariessa	Lower Tana river, Kenya		Deforestation.	
1961		Cynorkis bimaculata	Manjakatompo, Antananarivo, Madagascar		Undetermined.	
1961		Dryophthorus distinguendus	Hawaii, United States	1986 (IUCN)	Possibly habitat loss and invasive species.	
1961	Viesca mud turtle	Kinosternon hirtipes megacephalum	Southwestern Coahuila, Mexico		Drainage of habitat.	
1961	Semper's warbler (Note: Unconfirmed sighting in 2015 (IUCN).)	Leucopeza semperi	St Lucia mountains		Predation by introduced Javan mongooses.	
1961		Lijndenia brenanii	Usambara Mountains, Tanzania		Habitat degradation caused by overcollection, logging, gold mining, and introduced Maesopsis.	
1961	Durango shiner	Notropis aulidion	Tunal river, Durango, Mexico	1990 (IUCN)	Pollution and introduced species.	
1961	Zacatecas Worthen's sparrow	Spizella wortheni browni	Northwest Zacatecas, Mexico	1991	Habitat destruction caused by agriculture, overgrazing, cattle-induced erosion, and decline of native herbivores.	
1961–1963	Kākāwahie	Paroreomyza flammea	Molokai, Hawaii, United States	1979; 1994 (IUCN)	Probably habitat destruction and introduced disease.	
1962	Du Toit's torrent frog	Arthroleptides dutoiti	Kenya-Uganda border	Assessed as extinct in 1994, but upgraded to Critically Endangered in 2004.	Possibly habitat degradation and chytridiomycosis.	
1962	Red-bellied gracile opossum	Cryptonanus ignitus	Jujuy, Argentina	2008 (IUCN)	Habitat loss to agriculture and industry development.	
1962	Gloomy tube-nosed bat	Murina tenebrosa	Tsushima Island and possibly Yakushima, Japan		Undetermined.	
1962		Ptychochromis onilahy	Onilahy River, Madagascar	2004 (IUCN)	Overfishing, deforestation leading to increased sedimentation, and competition with introduced tilapias.	
1962	Tacoma pocket gopher	Thomomys mazama tacomensis	Puget Sound and Olympic Peninsula, Washington, United States	2000 (IUCN)	Habitat destruction due to residential development and gravel mining.	
1963	Oahu treesnail	Achatinella abbreviata	Koolau Mountains, Hawaii, United States	1990 (IUCN)	Undetermined.	
1963		Angraecum rubellum	Moramanga, Toamasina, Madagascar		Undetermined.	
1963	Campo Grande tree frog	Boana cymbalum	São Paulo, Brazil	2023 (IUCN)	The only two known locations have been completely lost to urban development. If it survived in the nearby Serra da Paranapiacaba it may have been lost to pollution and chytridiomycosis during the 1970s or 1980s.	
1963	Saint Helena darter	Sympetrum dilatatum	Saint Helena	1996-2021 (IUCN)	Probably deforestation and predation by extinct aquatic carnivores including the African clawed frog.	
1964	Hawaii chaff flower	Achyranthes atollensis	The atolls Kure, Midway, Pearl and Hermes, and Laysan of the Northwestern Hawaiian Islands, United States	2003 (IUCN)	Habitat loss due to the construction of military installations.	
1964		Barbodes disa	Lake Lanao, Mindanao, Philippines	2020 (IUCN)	Overfishing and predation by introduced tank goby and ornate sleeper.	
1964	Katapa-tapa	Barbodes flavifuscus	Lake Lanao, Mindanao, Philippines	2020 (IUCN)	Overfishing and predation by introduced tank goby and ornate sleeper.	
1964	Kandar	Barbodes lanaoensis	Lake Lanao, Mindanao, Philippines	2020 (IUCN)	Overfishing and predation by introduced tank goby and ornate sleeper.	
1964	Bitungu	Barbodes pachycheilus	Lake Lanao, Mindanao, Philippines	2020 (IUCN)	Overfishing and predation by introduced tank goby and ornate sleeper.	
1964		Barbodes palata	Lake Lanao, Mindanao, Philippines	2020 (IUCN)	Overfishing and predation by introduced tank goby and ornate sleeper.	
1964	Bagangan	Barbodes resimus	Lake Lanao, Mindanao, Philippines	2020 (IUCN)	Overfishing and predation by introduced tank goby and ornate sleeper.	
1964		Bulbophyllum erythroglossum	Toamasina, Madasgacar		Undetermined.	
1964	South Island snipe	Coenocorypha iredalei	South and Stewart islands, New Zealand	2014 (IUCN)	Predation by introduced animals.	
1964	Lake Ontario kiyi	Coregonus kiyi orientalis	Lake Ontario		Overfishing, introduction of exotic species, eutrophication, and water pollution.	
1964	Goldman's yellow rail	Coturnicops noveboracensis goldmani	Lerma River, Mexico		Undetermined.	
1964	Achatinellid land snail	Newcombia philippiana	Hawaii, United States		Undetermined.	
1964	Rio Grande bluntnose shiner	Notropis simus simus	Upper Rio Grande		Possibly habitat degradation and introduced species.	
1964	Laysan weevil	Oodemas laysanensis	Laysan, Hawaii, United States	1986 (IUCN)	Possibly habitat degradation caused by introduced rabbits and plants.	
1964	Crested shelduck (Note: Unconfirmed sighting in 1971 (IUCN).)	Tadorna cristata	Primorye, Hokkaido, and Korea; Northeastern China?		Undetermined.	
1965		Euphorbia neospinescens	Chunya District, Tanzania		Agricultural expansion and charcoal burning.	
1965	Santo Stefano lizard	Podarcis siculus sanctistephani	Santo Stefano Island, Italy		Introduced epidemic and predation by introduced snakes and feral cats.	
1966–1967		Aplothorax burchelli	Saint Helena		Undetermined.	
1967	Oahu treesnail	Achatinella dimorpha	Koʻolau Range, Hawaii, United States		Undetermined.	
1967		Anisopappus burundiense	Central Burundi		Habitat destruction caused by agriculture.	
1967	Narrow catspaw	Epioblasma lenior	Tennessee River system, United States	1983–2000 (IUCN)	Damming.	
1967	Saint Helena earwig	Labidura herculeana	Saint Helena	2014 (IUCN)	Predation by introduced animals.	
1967	New Zealand greater short-tailed bat	Mystacina robusta	New Zealand	1988 (IUCN)	Predation by introduced Polynesian and black rats.	
1968		Belgrandiella boetersi	Tiefsteinschlucht, Austria		Likely groundwater abstraction and habitat degradation.	
1968	San Clemente wren	Thryomanes bewickii leucophrys	San Clemente, Channel Islands of California, United States		Vegetation destruction by introduced goats and sheep.	
1968	Guam flying fox	Pteropus tokudae	Guam	2004 (IUCN)	Hunting and predation by the introduced brown tree snake.	
1969	Nightingale reed warbler	Acrocephalus luscinius	Guam	2023 (IUCN)	Habitat loss from drainage and burning of wetlands, pesticide use, and predation by introduced cats and rats.	
1969	Kauaʻi ʻakialoa	Akialoa stejnegeri	Kauaʻi, Hawaii, United States	2016 (IUCN)	Possibly habitat destruction and introduced disease.	
1969	Kouprey (Note: Unconfirmed sightings in 1982-1983.)	Bos sauveli	Southern Vietnam to Yunnan, China		Hunting.	
1969	Blackfin cisco	Coregonus nigripinnis	Lakes Michigan and Huron	1996 (IUCN)	Overfishing, predation by introduced sea lampreys, and hybridization with other ciscoes.	
1969	Tubercled blossom	Epioblasma torulosa torulosa	Tennessee and Ohio River systems, United States		Impoundment, siltation, and pollution.	

=== 1970s ===
Last record	Common name	Binomial name	Former range	Declared extinct	Causes	Picture
c. 1970	Socorro elf owl	Micrathene whitneyi graysoni	Socorro, Revillagigedo Islands, Mexico		Likely predation by introduced domestic cats.	
1970	Amastrid land snail	Carelia bicolor	Kauai, Hawaii, United States	1990 (IUCN)	Undetermined.	
1970		Diplazium ulugurense	Bondwa, Uluguru Mountains, Tanzania		Deforestation for agriculture.	
1970	Acornshell	Epioblasma haysiana	Tennessee and Cumberland River systems, United States	1994 (IUCN)	Exposure to domestic sewage, habitat degradatation and fragmentation.	
1970	Mexican dace	Evarra bustamantei	Xochimilco-Tlahuac channels, Mexico	1983 (IUCN)	Habitat destruction and pollution.	
1970	Endorheic chub	Evarra tlahuacensis	Lake Chalco, Valley of Mexico	1983 (IUCN)	Habitat destruction and pollution.	
1970	Saudi gazelle	Gazella saudiya	Arabian Peninsula	2006 (IUCN)	Hunting.	
1970	Llanfairfechan hawkweed	Hieracium cambricogothicum	Gwynedd, Wales		Herbicides and road construction.	
1970	Clear Lake splittail	Pogonichthys ciscoides	Clear Lake and its tributaries, California, United States	1986 (IUCN)	Habitat destruction and pollution from agriculture.	
1970–1979	Pagan reed warbler	Acrocephalus yamashinae	Pagan, Northern Mariana Islands	1981; 2016 (IUCN)	Habitat destruction and predation by introduced rats and cats.	
1970–1979	Lake Constance whitefish	Coregonus gutturosus	Lake Constance, Germany-Austria-Switzerland triple border	2008 (IUCN)	Eutrophication.	
1970–1979	Tien Shan dhole	Cuon alpinus hesperius	Pamir to Altai Mountains		Undetermined. (Note: Scat from a dhole of unknown subspecies was found in the Bek-Tosot Conservancy of southern Kyrgyzstan in 2022.)	
1970–1979	Western Turner's eremomela	Eremomela turneri kalindei	Southeast D. R. Congo and southwest Uganda		Possibly deforestation.	
1970–1979	Nubian wild ass	Equus africanus africanus	Nubian Desert		Hunting for food and traditional medicine, competition with livestock for vegetation and water, possibly interbreeding with domestic donkeys.	
1970–1979	Madeiran large white	Pieris brassicae wollastoni	Madeira, Portugal		Possibly introduced diseases and the parasitoid wasp Cotesia glomerata.	
1970–1979		Tristramella intermedia	Lake Hula, Israel	2006 (IUCN)	Draining of the lake and adjacent marshes.	
1970-1982		Polystachya porphyrochila	Uluguru Mountains, Tanzania		Deforestation for agriculture.	
1970–1989		Aplocheilichthys sp. nov. 'Naivasha'	Lake Naivasha, Kenya	2004 (IUCN)	Competition and predation by introduced fish.	
1971		Blotiella coriacea	South Uluguru Mountains, Tanzania		Deforestation for agriculture.	
1971		Cotula myriophylloides	Cape Peninsula, South Africa		Wetland draining and competition with introduced plants.	
1971	Santa Cruz pupfish	Cyprinodon arcuatus	Santa Cruz River, Arizona, United States	2011 (IUCN)	Predation by introduced largemouth bass.	
1971	Ticao Tarictic hornbill	Penelopidis panini ticaensis	Ticao Island, Philippines		Habitat destruction. Sometimes not considered a subspecies but a color morph.	
1971	Lake Pedder earthworm	Hypolimnus pedderensis	Lake Pedder, Tasmania, Australia	2003 (IUCN)	Flooding of Lake Pedder for a hydroelectric power scheme.	
before 1972	Tecopa pupfish	Cyprinodon nevadensis calidae	Tecopa Hot Springs, California, United States	1994	Habitat degradation and introduced bluegill sunfish and mosquito fish.	
1972	Tropical acidweed	Desmarestia tropica	Galápagos Islands, Ecuador		Undetermined.	
1972	Turgid blossom	Epioblasma turgidula	Southern Appalachians and Cumberland Plateau, United States		Damming and water pollution.	
1972	Mason River myrtle	Myrcia skeldingii	Mason River, Jamaica	1998 (IUCN)	Undetermined.	
1972	Bushwren louse	Philopteroides xenicus	New Zealand		Parasite of the bushwren, extinct with its host.	
1972	Grey groundsel	Senecio georgianus	Western, eastern, and southern Australia, including Tasmania		Undetermined.	
1972	Bushwren	Xenicus longipes	New Zealand	1994 (IUCN)	Predation by introduced cats, rats, weasels, and stoats.	
1973		Barbodes cataractae	Misamis Occidental and Lake Lanao, Philippines		Overfishing and predation by introduced fish. Possibly also pollution caused by mining.	
1973	Bitungu	Barbodes truncatulus	Lake Lanao, Mindanao, Philippines	2020 (IUCN)	Predation by introduced tank goby and ornate sleeper.	
1973		Cenchrus agrimonioides var. laysanensis	Kure, Midway, and Laysan, Hawaii, United States	2003 (IUCN)	Predation by introduced rabbits, and construction of military installations.	
1973	Peppered tree frog	Dryopsophus piperatus	Northern Tablelands, New South Wales, Australia		Undetermined.	
1973	Guadeloupe house wren	Troglodytes aedon guadeloupensis	Guadeloupe		Deforestation.	
1974	Barbodes herrei	Lake Lanao, Mindanao, Philippines	2020 (IUCN)	Predation by introduced tank goby and ornate sleeper.		
1974	Vanua Levu long-legged thicketbird (Note: Unconfirmed sighting in 1990 (Hume, 2017).)	Cincloramphus rufus cluniei	Vanua Levu, Fiji		Undetermined.	
1974	Amistad gambusia	Gambusia amistadensis	Goodenough Spring, Texas, United States	1986 (IUCN); 1987	Disappeared from the wild when the spring was flooded by the Amistad Reservoir in 1969. All captive individuals later hybridized with mosquitofish accidentally.	
1974	Flores rail	Lewinia pectoralis exsul	South and west Flores, Indonesia		Undetermined.	
1974	Aragua robber frog	Pristimantis anotis	Henri Pittier National Park, Aragua, Venezuela		Chytridiomycosis?	
1975	Bagangan	Barbodes clemensi	Lake Lanao, Mindanao, Philippines	2020 (IUCN)	Predation by introduced tank goby and ornate sleeper.	
1975	Bitungu	Barbodes palaemophagus	Lake Lanao, Mindanao, Philippines	2020 (IUCN)	Predation by introduced tank goby and ornate sleeper.	
1975	Round Island burrowing boa	Bolyeria multocarinata	Round Island, Mauritius?	1996 (IUCN)	Habitat degradation by introduced goats and rabbits.	
1975	Longjaw cisco	Coregonus alpenae	Lakes Michigan, Huron, and Erie	1986 (IUCN)	Overfishing, predation by introduced sea lampreys, and hybridization with introduced ciscoes.	
1975	Hula bream	Mirogrex hulensis	Lake Hula, Israel	1996 (IUCN)	Draining of the lake to turn the bottom into farmland.	
1975	Phantom shiner	Notropis orca	Rio Grande	1986 (IUCN)	Possibly habitat loss, hybridization with the bluntnose shiner, and introduction of exotic fishes.	
1975	Norfolk thrush	Turdus poliocephalus poliocephalus	Norfolk Island, Australia		Clearing of vegetation, predation by rats and feral cats, competition and interbreeding with introduced song thrushes and common blackbirds.	
1975–1977	Siamese flat-barbelled catfish	Platytropius siamensis	Chao Phraya and Bang Pakong River basins, Thailand	2011 (IUCN)	Damming and canalization of rivers, pollution, and reclamation of wetlands.	
1976		Barbodes tras	Lake Lanao, Mindanao, Philippines	2020 (IUCN)	Predation by introduced tank goby and ornate sleeper.	
1976	Jalpa false brook salamander	Pseudoeurycea exspectata	Cerro Miramundo, Jalapa, Guatemala	2020 (IUCN)	Possibly logging and cattle grazing.	
1976	Mexican grizzly bear	Ursus arctos nelsoni	Aridoamerica		Hunting. DNA evidence does not support its status as a separate subspecies.	
1977		Barbodes katolo	Lake Lanao, Mindanao, Philippines	2020 (IUCN)	Predation by introduced tank goby and ornate sleeper.	
1977		Barbodes manalak	Lake Lanao, Mindanao, Philippines	2020 (IUCN)	Predation by introduced tank goby and ornate sleeper.	
1977	Gonâve eastern chat-tanager	Calyptophilus frugivorus abbotti	Gonâve Island, Haiti		Deforestation.	
1977		Cyanea eleeleensis	Wainiha Valley, Kauai, Hawaii, United States	2016 (IUCN)	Landslides, introduced pigs, weeds, invertebrates, and possibly rats.	
1977	Golden partula	Partula aurantia	Moorea, Society Islands, French Polynesia	1988 (IUCN)	Predation by introduced rosy wolfsnails.	
1977	Burch's partula	Partula jackieburchi	Tahiti, Society Islands, French Polynesia	1996 (IUCN)	Predation by introduced rosy wolfsnails.	
1977	Tahitian banded tree snail	Partula producta	Faurahi Valley, Tahiti, French Polynesia	1994 (IUCN)	Predation by introduced rosy wolfsnails.	
1977	Colombian grebe	Podiceps andinus	Bogotá wetlands, Colombia	1994 (IUCN)	Habitat loss, pollution, hunting, and predation of chicks by introduced rainbow trout.	
1977	Eiao monarch	Pomarea fluxa	Eiao, Marquesas Islands, French Polynesia	2006 (IUCN)	Possibly predation by introduced cats, black rats, and Polynesian rats; disease transmitted by introduced chestnut-breasted mannikin, and habitat loss due to grazing by sheep.	
1978		Albizia lankaensis	Ramboda, Sri Lanka		Deforestation.	
1978		Craugastor myllomyllon	Finca Volcán, Alta Verapaz, Guatemala	2020 (IUCN)	Habitat destruction for agriculture.	
1978	White-eyed river martin (Note: Unconfirmed sighting in 1980 (Hume).)	Eurochelidon sirintarae	Central Thailand		Hunting and habitat loss.	
1978	Little earth hutia	Mesocapromys sanfelipensis	Key Juan García, Cuba		Hunting, man-made fires, and competition with black rats.	
1978	Miss Waldron's red colobus (Note: A skin was found in possession of a hunter in 2002, and possible calls were heard in 2008 (IUCN).)	Piliocolobus waldronae	Rainforests of Ghana and Ivory Coast	2000	Hunting and deforestation.	
1978		Tetramolopium consanguineum ssp. consanguineum (Note: In captivity. Last recorded in the wild in 1868 (IUCN).)	Kauai, Hawaii, United States	2016 (IUCN)	Undetermined.	
1979	Short Spider-orchid	Caladenia brachyscapa	Warrnambool, Victoria and Clarke Island, Tasmania, Australia		Undetermined.	
1979	Magnificent spider-orchid	Caladenia magnifica	Central Victoria, Australia		Undetermined.	
1979	Yunnan lake newt	Hypselotriton wolterstorffi	Kunming Lake, Yunnan, China	2005 (IUCN)	Pollution, habitat destruction, and introduced fish and frog species.	
1979	Japanese otter	Lutra nippon	Honshu, Kyushu, and Shikoku, Japan	2012	Hunting and habitat loss.	
1979	British large blue	Phengaris arion eutyphron	Southern Britain		Undetermined.	
1979	Mount Glorious day frog	Taudactylus diurnus	Southeast Queensland, Australia	2008 (IUCN)	Undetermined.	
1979	Caspian tiger (Note: In captivity. Last individual in the wild killed in 1970 (Rossi).)	Panthera tigris virgata	Central and Western Asia	2007 (IUCN)	Hunting and habitat destruction. (Note: Genetics do not support subspecific differentiation with extant mainland tigers.)	

=== 1980s ===
Last record	Common name	Binomial name	Former range	Declared extinct	Causes	Picture
1980		Basananthe cupricola	Mine de l'Etoile, Katanga Copperbelt, Democratic Republic of the Congo		Habitat destruction caused by surface mining.	
1980	Pupillid land snail	Lyropupa perlonga	Oahu, Hawaii, United States		Undetermined.	
1980	Olomaʻo (Note: Unconfirmed sighting in 2005 (IUCN).)	Myadestes lanaiensis	Maui, Lana'i, and Molokai, Hawaii		Disease and habitat degradation caused by introduced pigs, axis deer, and mosquitos.	
1980	Dutch alcon blue	Phengaris alcon arenaria	Utrecht and Holland, Netherlands		Undetermined.	
1980–1985	Roberts's lechwe	Kobus leche robertsi	Luongo and Kalungwishi drainage systems, Luapula, Zambia	1994 (IUCN)	Undetermined.	
1980-1989	Taha'a banded tree snail	Partula bilineata	Taha'a, Society Islands, French Polynesia	1996 (IUCN)	Predation by introduced rosy wolfsnails.	
1980-1989	Raiatean streaked tree snail	Partula dolichostoma	Raiatea, Society Islands, French Polynesia	1994 (IUCN)	Predation by introduced rosy wolfsnails.	
1980-1989	Taha'a hermit tree snail	Partula eremita	Taha'a, Society Islands, French Polynesia	1996 (IUCN)	Predation by introduced rosy wolfsnails.	
1981		Anabarilius macrolepis	Yilong Lake, Yunnan, China	2011 (IUCN)	Drying of the lake for 20 days, after excessive water abstraction for agriculture.	
1981	Mariana mallard (Note: In captivity. Last captured in the wild in 1979.)	Anas platyrhynchos oustaleti	Mariana Islands	2005 (IUCN)	Hunting and habitat loss to agriculture.	
1981	Yilong carp	Cyprinus yilongensis	Yilong Lake, Yunnan, China	1996 (IUCN)	Drying of the lake after excessive water abstraction for agriculture.	
1981	Canary Islands oystercatcher	Haematopus meadewaldoi	Lanzarote and Fuerteventura, Spain; Senegal	1994 (IUCN)	Overharvesting of intertidal invertebrates.	
1981		Hernandia drakeana	Moorea, Society Islands, French Polynesia	1998 (IUCN)	Undetermined.	
1981	Puhielelu hibiscadelphus	Hibiscadelphus crucibracteatus	Lana'i, Hawaii, United States	1998 (IUCN)	Predation by introduced axis deer.	
1981	Bishop's ʻōʻō	Moho bishopi	Molokai, Hawaii, United States	2000 (IUCN)	Habitat loss to agriculture and livestock grazing, followed by the introduction of black rats and disease-carrying mosquitos.	
1981	Chile Darwin's frog	Rhinoderma rufum	Valparaíso and Biobío, Chile		Chytridiomycosis?	
1982	Pait	Barbodes amarus	Lake Lanao, Mindanao, Philippines	2020 (IUCN)	Predation by introduced fishes.	
1982	Samaná eastern chat-tanager	Calyptophilus frugivorus frugivorus	Samaná Peninsula, Dominican Republic		Deforestation.	
1982–1983	Galápagos damsel	Azurina eupalama	Galápagos Islands, Ecuador		1982-83 El Niño event.	
1982–1983	24-rayed sunstar	Heliaster solaris	Galápagos Islands, Ecuador		1982-83 El Niño event.	
before 1983		Ohridohauffenia drimica	Upper Drin River, North Macedonia	1994 (IUCN)	Draining of the river.	
1983		Amaranthus brownii	Nīhoa, Hawaii, United States	2018 (IUCN)	Competition with introduced plant species, landslides, fires, and predation and habitat degradation by introduced animals.	
1983	Ivell's sea anemone	Edwardsia ivelli	Widewater Lagoon, West Sussex, England		Possibly water pollution.	
1983	San Marcos gambusia	Gambusia georgei	San Marcos spring and river, Texas, United States	2021 (IUCN)	Reduced flow and pollution from agriculture, introduced fishes and plants (Colocasia esculenta), and hybridization with Gambusia affinis.	
1983	Formosan clouded leopard (Note: Unconfirmed sighting in 2019.)	Neofelis nebulosa brachyura	Taiwan	2013	Hunting. (Note: Subspecific status has been denied on morphological and genetic grounds.)	
1983	Aldabra brush-warbler	Nesillas aldabrana	Malabar Island, Seychelles	1994 (IUCN)	Possibly predation by introduced cats and rats, and habitat degradation by goats and tortoises.	
1983	Southern gastric-brooding frog (Note: In captivity. Last collected in the wild in 1981 (IUCN).)	Rheobatrachus silus	Southeast Queensland, Australia	2006 (IUCN)	Undetermined, possibly chytridiomycosis.	
1983	Escobilla de masca	Thesium psilotocladum	Barranco de Masca, Tenerife, Spain		Predation by introduced goats and rabbits.	
1983	Guam bridled white-eye	Zosterops conspicillatus conspicillatus	Guam		Predation by introduced brown tree snakes.	
1983–1986	Atitlán grebe	Podilymbus gigas	Lake Atitlán, Guatemala	1990 (IUCN)	Predation and competition with introduced largemouth bass, water level fall after the 1976 Guatemala earthquake, and degradation of breeding sites due to reed-cutting and tourism development.	
1984	Green blossom	Epioblasma torulosa gubernaculum	Tennessee River system, United States		Impoundment, siltation, and pollution.	
1984	Guam flycatcher (Note: In captivity. Last collected from the wild in 1983 (Hume).)	Myiagra freycineti	Guam	2004 (IUCN); 2005	Predation by the introduced brown tree snake, possibly also introduced diseases.	
1984	Javan tiger	Panthera tigris sondaica	Java, Indonesia	2010 (IUCN)	Hunting and habitat loss. (Note: Genetics do not support subspecies differentiation with the extant Sumatran tiger; if placed in the same subspecies, this would have the name P. t. sondaica due to being older.)	
1984–1985	Guam rufous fantail	Rhipidura rufifrons uraniae	Guam		Predation by introduced brown tree snakes.	
c. 1985	California condor louse	Colpocephalum californici	North America		Delousing of all surviving California condors before beginning their captive breeding program.	
1985	Kauai agrotis noctuid moth	Agrotis tephrias	Kauai, Maui, and possibly Hawaii (island), Hawaii, United States		Undetermined.	
1985	Timucua heart lichen	Cora timucua	Florida, United States		Habitat destruction for urban development.	
1985	Christmas Island shrew	Crocidura trichura	Christmas Island, Australia		Undetermined.	
1985	Kāmaʻo (Note: Unconfirmed reports until 1991 (IUCN).)	Myadestes myadestinus	Kauaʻi, Hawaii, United States	2004 (IUCN)	Habitat loss and disease spread by introduced mosquitos.	
1985		Oldenlandia adscensionis	Green Mountain, Ascension Island	1998 (IUCN)	Predation by introduced goats, sheep, rabbits, and rats; or competition with introduced plants.	
1985	Oʻahu ʻalauahio	Paroreomyza maculata	Oahu, Hawaii, United States		Possibly disease spread by introduced mosquitos.	
1985	Northern gastric-brooding frog	Rheobatrachus vitellinus	Mid-eastern Queensland, Australia	2015 (IUCN)	Undetermined, possibly chytridiomycosis.	
1985	Alaotra grebe (Note: Unconfirmed sighting in 1988 (IUCN).)	Tachybaptus rufolavatus	Lake Alaotra, Madagascar	2010 (IUCN)	Hunting, accidental capture in nylon gillnets, predation and competition with introduced largemouth bass, striped snakehead, and Tilapia; habitat degradation from agriculture, and hybridization with the little grebe.	
1985-1989	Taha'a large tree snail	Partula planilabrum	Taha'a, Society Islands, French Polynesia	1996 (IUCN)	Predation by introduced rosy wolfsnails.	
1985-1989	Arrow-head tree snail	Partula sagitta	Taha'a, Society Islands, French Polynesia	1996 (IUCN)	Predation by introduced rosy wolfsnails.	
1985-1989	Taha'a squat tree snail	Partula umbilicata	Taha'a, Society Islands, French Polynesia	1996 (IUCN)	Predation by introduced rosy wolfsnails.	
1986	Pass stubfoot toad	Atelopus senex	Central Costa Rica	2020 (IUCN)	Possibly chytridiomycosis or climate change.	
1986	Zanzibar leopard (Note: Unconfirmed recording in 2018 (Rossi, 2020).)	Panthera pardus adersi	Unguja Island, Tanzania		Extermination campaign. (Note: This subspecies has been subsumed into the extant African leopard on morphological grounds.)	
1986	Bora Bora tree snail	Partula lutea	Bora Bora, Society Islands, French Polynesia	1994 (IUCN)	Predation by introduced rosy wolfsnails.	
1986	Eastern Canary Islands chiffchaff	Phylloscopus canariensis exsul	Lanzarote and Fuerteventura?, Canary Islands		Habitat loss?	
1986	Banff longnose dace	Rhinichthys cataractae smithi	Banff National Park, Alberta, Canada	1987	Habitat degradation, competition and hybridization with introduced fishes.	
after 1986	Coast dandelion	Taraxacum cygnorum	Australia		Undetermined.	
1987	Dusky seaside sparrow (Note: In captivity. Last seen in the wild in 1980 (Walter, 1992).)	Ammospiza maritima nigrescens	Merritt Island and the St. Johns River, Florida, United States	1990	Flooding and draining of marshes to reduce mosquito population.	
1987	Cuban ivory-billed woodpecker (Note: Unconfirmed sighting in 1998 (IUCN).)	Campephilus principalis bairdii	Cuba		Habitat loss.	
1987		Delissea takeuchii	Waianae Mountains, Oahu, Hawaii, United States		Competition with introduced plants like Psidium cattleianum and Clidemia hirta, predation and trampling by introduced animals including pigs.	
1987	Kauaʻi ʻōʻō	Moho braccatus	Kauaʻi, Hawaii, United States	2021 (IUCN)	Habitat loss and introduced black rats, pigs, and disease-carrying mosquitos. The last female was killed by Hurricane Iwa during the 1982–1983 El Niño event.	
1987		Namibcypris costata	Southern Kaokoveld, Namibia	1996 (IUCN)	Habitat destruction.	
1987	Eskimo curlew (Note: Unconfirmed sighting in 2006 (Hume, 2017).)	Numenius borealis	Northwestern Canada and Alaska, and Southern Cone		Hunting and habitat destruction.	
1987		Phyllostegia kahiliensis	Mount Kahili, Kauai, Hawaii, United States		Possibly invasive plants, ungulates, snails, slugs, and rodents.	
1987–1993	Moroccan bustard	Ardeotis arabs lynesi	Western Morocco		Undetermined.	
before 1988		Graecoanatolica macedonica	Doiran Lake, Greece-North Macedonia border	2002 (IUCN)	Water substraction.	
1988		Caladenia thysanochila	Mount Eliza, Victoria, Australia		Undetermined.	
1988	Maui ʻakepa	Loxops ochraceus	Maui, Hawaii, United States		Undetermined.	
1988	Bachman's warbler	Vermivora bachmanii	Southeastern United States and Cuba		Habitat destruction from swampland draining and sugarcane agriculture.	
1989	Tunisian barb	Luciobarbus antinorii	Chott el Djerid, Tunisia	2022 (IUCN)	Water substraction.	
1989	Golden toad	Incilius periglenes	Monteverde Cloud Forest Reserve, Costa Rica	2005 (IUCN)	Anthropogenic global warming, chytridiomycosis, and airborne pollution.	
1989	ʻŌʻū (Note: Unconfirmed sightings after 1995 (IUCN).)	Psittirostra psittacea	Hawaii, United States	2024 (IUCN)	Possibly habitat loss, predation by introduced rats, and malaria spread by exotic mosquitos.	
1989	Jamaican golden swallow	Tachycineta euchrysea euchrysea	Jamaica		Deforestation?	
1989	Malabar large-spotted civet	Viverra civettina	Western Ghats, India		Possibly deforestation, hunting, and predation by domestic dogs.	
1989-1990	Long jaw tristramella	Tristramella sacra	Sea of Galilee	2014 (IUCN)	Possibly destruction of its breeding habitat in the marshes of the northern shore of the lake.	

=== 1990s ===
Last record	Common name	Binomial name	Former range	Declared extinct	Causes	Picture
c. 1990		Zonites embolium	Islets of Dyo Adelfoi, Megali Zafrano, Karavonisi, and Divounia, inbetween Astypalaia and Karpathos, Greece		Possibly habitat degradation caused by military use, introduced rats and rabbits.	
1990	Haha	Cyanea dolichopoda	Wailua River, Kauai, Hawaii, United States	2003 (IUCN)	Landslide caused by a hurricane, climate change.	
1990		Canavalia veillonii	Bourail, New Caledonia		Deforestation caused by uncontrolled fires, clearing for agriculture, and predation by introduced rusa deer.	
1990	Barbados scaly-breasted thrasher	Margarops fuscus atlantica	Barbados		Deforestation.	
1990	Mountain mist frog	Mosleyia nyakalensis	Queensland, Australia	2020 (IUCN)	Habitat loss and chytridiomycosis.	
1990–1999	Negros celestial monarch	Hypothymis coelestis rabori	Negros and possibly Sibuyan Island, Philippines		Deforestation.	
before 1991	Garrett's rustic tree snail	Partula garrettii rustica	Raiatea, Society Islands, French Polynesia	2022 (IUCN)	Predation by introduced rosy wolfsnails.	
1991	Baolan	Barbodes baoulan	Lake Lanao, Mindanao, Philippines	2020 (IUCN)	Predation by introduced fishes.	
1991		Cambarellus alvarezi	Potosí Spring, Nuevo León, Mexico	2010 (IUCN)	Water abstraction	
1991	Na'ena'e	Dubautia kenwoodii	Kalalau Valley, Kauai, Hawaii, United States		Possibly wiped out by Hurricane Iniki.	
1991	Thalia's tree snail	Partula garrettii thalia	Raiatea, Society Islands, French Polynesia	2022 (IUCN)	Predation by introduced rosy wolfsnails.	
1991	Montane monkey-faced bat	Pteralopex pulchra	Mount Makarakomburu, Guadalcanal, Solomon Islands		Undetermined.	
1991-1992	Thick-lipped tree snail	Partula crassilabris	Raiatea, Society Islands, French Polynesia	1994 (IUCN)	Predation by introduced rosy wolfsnails.	
1991-1992	Raiatean banded partula	Partula protracta	Raiatea, Society Islands, French Polynesia	1994 (IUCN)	Predation by introduced rosy wolfsnails.	
1991-1992	Remote tree snail	Partula remota	Raiatea, Society Islands, French Polynesia	1994 (IUCN)	Predation by introduced rosy wolfsnails.	
1992		Callerya neocaledonica	Nakutakoin, Dumbea, New Caledonia		Habitat degradation caused by uncontrolled fires and introduced cattle, pigs, and rusa deer.	
1992	Tiwi Islands hooded robin	Melanodryas cucullata melvillensis	Melville and Bathurst Islands, Northern Territory, Australia		Possibly changes in the fire regime.	
1992	Splendid poison frog	Oophaga speciosa	Western Panama		Chytridiomycosis.	
1992	Raiatean ground partula	Partula atilis	Raiatea, Society Islands, French Polynesia	1994 (IUCN)	Predation by introduced rosy wolfsnails.	
1992	Auriculate tree snail	Partula auriculata	Raiatea, Society Islands, French Polynesia	1994 (IUCN)	Predation by introduced rosy wolfsnails.	
1992	Slender mountain tree snail	Partula dolorosa	Raiatea, Society Islands, French Polynesia	1996 (IUCN)	Predation by introduced rosy wolfsnails.	
1992	Thin-lipped tree snail	Partula leptochila	Raiatea, Society Islands, French Polynesia	1994 (IUCN)	Predation by introduced rosy wolfsnails.	
1992	Raiatean ground partula	Partula levistriata	Raiatea, Society Islands, French Polynesia	1994 (IUCN)	Predation by introduced rosy wolfsnails.	
1992	Aru flying fox	Pteropus aruensis	Aru Islands, Indonesia		Possibly hunting and deforestation caused by sugarcane plantation.	
after 1992	Undulata delissea	Delissea undulata subsp. undulata	Maui, Hawaii, United States	2016 (IUCN)	Likely invasive plants, animals, and habitat loss because of clearance for agriculture and increasing frequency of fires.	
1993	Angel Island mouse	Peromyscus guardia	Isla Ángel de la Guarda, Baja California, Mexico		Competition with introduced rodents and predation by cats.	
before 1994		Pachnodus velutinus	Mahé, Seychelles	2000 (IUCN)	Hybridization with Pachnodus niger.	
1994	Huahine tiny tree snail	Partula arguta	Huahine, Society Islands, French Polynesia	1996 (IUCN)	Predation by introduced rosy wolfsnails.	
c. 1995	Aguijan reed warbler	Acrocephalus nijoi	Aguijan, Mariana Islands	2000–2009; 2016 (IUCN)	Habitat destruction caused by goats introduced in the 1950s.	
1995	Pohnpei starling	Aplonis pelzelni	Pohnpei, Micronesia		Possibly habitat loss, hunting, and predation by introduced rats.	
1995	Maui nukupu'u	Hemignathus affinis	Maui, Hawaii, United States		Undetermined.	
1995	Kaholuamanu melicope	Melicope macropus	Waimea, Kauai, Hawaii, United States	2016 (IUCN)	Predation and habitat destruction by introduced feral goats, pigs, and deer, and competition with introduced plants like Rubus rosifolius, R. argutus, Hedychium garderianum, and Kalanchoe pinnata.	
1996	Chiriqui harlequin frog	Atelopus chiriquiensis	Talamanca-Chiriqui mountains, Costa Rica	2020 (IUCN)	Chytridiomycosis.	
1996	Norfolk Island boobook	Ninox novaeseelandiae undulata	Norfolk Island, Australia		Deforestation leading to increased competition for nest-hollows with honeybees and crimson rosellas. (Note: Descendants of hybrids with the New Zealand subspecies survive in the island.)	
1996	Barbary leopard	Panthera pardus panthera	Atlas Mountains		Hunting. (Note: The subspecies has been subsumed into the extant African leopard on morphological grounds.)	
1996	Swollen Raiatea Tree Snail (Note: In captivity. Last captured in the wild in 1992 (IUCN).)	Partula turgida	Raiatea, Society Islands, French Polynesia	1996 (IUCN)	Predation by introduced rosy wolfsnails.	
1997	Green and red venter harlequin toad	Atelopus pinangoi	Mérida, Venezuela		Chytridiomicosis, habitat destruction, and predation by introduced trout.	
1997	Sangihe dwarf kingfisher	Ceyx fallax sangirensis	Sangihe Islands, Indonesia		Habitat destruction.	
1997	Sakaraha pygmy kingfisher	Corythornis madagascariensis dilutus	Southwestern Madagascar		Undetermined.	
1997	Iberian lynx louse	Felicola isidoroi	Iberian Peninsula		Undetermined.	
1997	Ua Pou monarch	Pomarea mira	Ua Pou, Marquesas, French Polynesia		Deforestation and predation by introduced black rats.	
1997	Sharp snouted day frog	Taudactylus acutirostris	Coastal north Queensland from Mount Graham to the Big Tableland	2022 (IUCN)	Chytridiomycosis.	
1998	Haha	Cyanea kolekoleensis	Wahiawa Drainage, Kauai, Hawaii, united States		All but eradicated by Hurricane Iniki, likely after suffering predation by introduced pigs, rats, and slugs, and competition with the introduced plants Clidemia hirta, Psidium cattleianum, and Cyathea cooperi.	
1999	Tora hartebeest	Alcelaphus buselaphus tora	Southwestern Eritrea and the Ethiopian-Sudanese border		Agro-pastoral development and hunting.	
1999	Bogardilla	Squalius palaciosi	Andújar, Spain	2022 (IUCN)	Damming and the introduction of invasive species.	

== See also ==
- Timeline of extinctions in the Holocene
- Timeline of extinctions in the 19th century
- Timeline of the 20th century
- 20th century in science
