= Malagodon madagascariensis =

Conservation status
- Extinct (early 1960s) (IUCN 3.1)

Scientific classification
- Kingdom: Animalia
- Phylum: Chordata
- Class: Actinopterygii
- Order: Cyprinodontiformes
- Family: Pantanodontidae
- Genus: †Malagodon
- Species: †M. madagascariensis

Binomial name
- †Malagodon madagascariensis (Arnoult, 1963)

Synonyms
- Oryzias madagascariensis Arnoult, 1963; Pantanodon madagascariensis (Arnoult, 1963)

Extinct species of fish

Malagodon madagascariensis is an extinct species of fish in the family Pantanodontidae. It was endemic to eastern Madagascar. Its natural habitats were rivers and swamps. It became extinct due to habitat loss and competition from introduced species of Gambusia. It was originally placed in the genus Pantanodon before being found to belong to its own distinct lineage, described as the genus Malagodon.
