= Eastcoast lampeye =

Conservation status
- Data Deficient (IUCN 3.1)

Scientific classification
- Kingdom: Animalia
- Phylum: Chordata
- Class: Actinopterygii
- Order: Cyprinodontiformes
- Family: Pantanodontidae
- Genus: Aliteranodon
- Species: A. stuhlmanni

Binomial name
- Aliteranodon stuhlmanni (C. G. E. Ahl, 1924)

Synonyms
- Haplochilichthys stuhlmanni Ahl, 1924; Aplocheilichthys stuhlmanni (Ahl, 1924); Micropanchax stuhlmanni (Ahl, 1924); Pantanodon stuhlmanni (Ahl, 1924)

Species of fish

The eastcoast lampeye (Aliteranodon stuhlmanni) is a species of fish in the family Pantanodontidae. It is endemic to coastal Kenya and Tanzania, where found in brackish water, mangrove swamps, pools, lagoons and river deltas. It reaches up to 5 cm (2.0 in) in total length. This fish was described by Ernst Ahl as Haplochilichthys stuhlmanni with the type locality given as Tanganyika Territory. The specific name honours the co-leader of the German East Africa Expedition (1889–1892) on which type was collected, Franz Ludwig Stuhlmann (1863–1928) of the German Colonial Service.

It was previously thought to be synonymous with Pantanodon podoxys from Tanzania, with the latter species being synonymized with A. stuhlmanni and the species being known as Pantanodon stuhlmanni. However, phylogenetic evidence supports the two being distinct species belonging to different genera.
