= Malagodon =

Scientific classification
- Kingdom: Animalia
- Phylum: Chordata
- Class: Actinopterygii
- Order: Cyprinodontiformes
- Family: Pantanodontidae
- Genus: †Malagodon; Meinema & Huber, 2023

Species
- M. honahona; M. madagascariensis

Extinct genus of fishes

Malagodon is a genus of extinct killifish that was endemic to coastal swamps in eastern Madagascar. Until recently, they were placed in the genus Pantanodon, but phylogenetic evidence supports them belonging to their own genus, Malagodon.

They were small, colorful fishes that inhabited extremely shallow water over a thick layer of sediment in forested estuarine swamps, and are presumed to have been driven extinct from habitat destruction, and introduction of invasive Gambusia.

The following species are known:

- †Malagodon madagascariensis (Arnoult, 1963) (extinct after 1960s)
- †Malagodon honahona Carr, Martin & Sparks, 2024 (extinct ca. late 1990s)
