= Malagodon honahona =

Conservation status
- Extinct (IUCN 3.1)

Scientific classification
- Kingdom: Animalia
- Phylum: Chordata
- Class: Actinopterygii
- Division: Teleostei
- Order: Cyprinodontiformes
- Family: Pantanodontidae
- Genus: †Malagodon
- Species: †M. honahona

Binomial name
- †Malagodon honahona Carr et al., 2024

Species of fish

Malagodon honahona, previously known as Pantanodon sp. nov. 'Manombo', is a species of killifish in the order Cyprinodontiformes. It is endemic to Madagascar. Its natural habitats are rivers and swamps. It is critically endangered and threatened by habitat loss. In 2024, it was officially described and the genus Malagodon erected for it, which was presumed extinct.
