= Perdicella helena =

Conservation status
- Endangered (IUCN 2.3)

- Critically Imperiled (NatureServe)

Scientific classification
- Kingdom: Animalia
- Phylum: Mollusca
- Class: Gastropoda
- Order: Stylommatophora
- Family: Achatinellidae
- Genus: Perdicella
- Species: P. helena

Binomial name
- Perdicella helena (Newcomb, 1853)

Species of gastropod

Perdicella helena is a species of tropical tree-living, pulmonate, land snails in the family Achatinellidae. This species is endemic to Hawaii in the United States.

== Distribution ==
Perdicella helena can be found on Molokaʻi and Maui. This species has been known to enter the islands by getting stuck to feathers of birds or floating tree trunks that found their way to Hawaii.

== Habitat ==
Perdicella helena can be found on the trunk, stems & leaves of certain non-pubescent plants that have the fungi they feed on. They can be found on the ground and in the vegetation.

== Description ==
Perdicella helena have a shell diameter of 3-10 mm.
