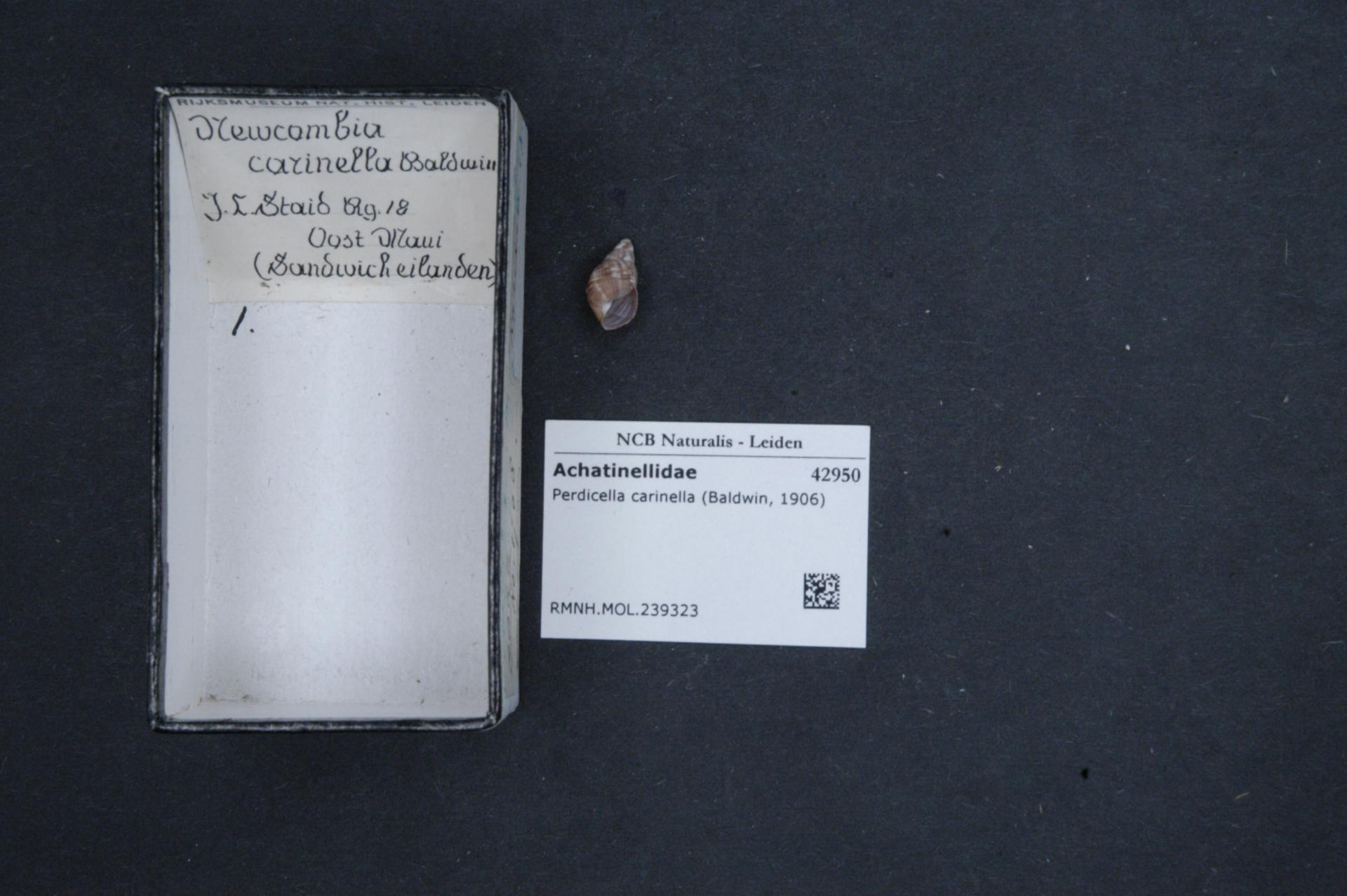

Conservation status
- Data Deficient (IUCN 2.3)

- Critically Imperiled (NatureServe)

Scientific classification
- Kingdom: Animalia
- Phylum: Mollusca
- Class: Gastropoda
- Order: Stylommatophora
- Family: Achatinellidae
- Genus: Perdicella
- Species: P. carinella

Binomial name
- Perdicella carinella (Baldwin, 1906)

= Perdicella carinella =

Species of gastropod

Perdicella carinella is a species of tropical, tree-living, air-breathing, land snail, an arboreal pulmonate gastropod mollusc in the family Achatinellidae. This species is endemic to Hawaii in the United States.
