= Aliteranodon =

Scientific classification
- Kingdom: Animalia
- Phylum: Chordata
- Class: Actinopterygii
- Order: Cyprinodontiformes
- Family: Pantanodontidae
- Genus: Aliteranodon; Meinema & Huber, 2023

Species
- See text

Genus of fishes

Aliteranodon is a genus of killifish native to eastern Africa.

== Species ==
The following species are known:

- Aliteranodon bucinus Meinema & Huber, 2023 (possibly extinct)
- Aliteranodon effusorium Huber & Meinema, 2024
- Aliteranodon filimbi Meinema & Huber, 2023
- Aliteranodon ndoano Meinema & Huber, 2023
- Aliteranodon rostratus Meinema & Huber, 2023
- Aliteranodon stuhlmanni (Ahl, 1924)
