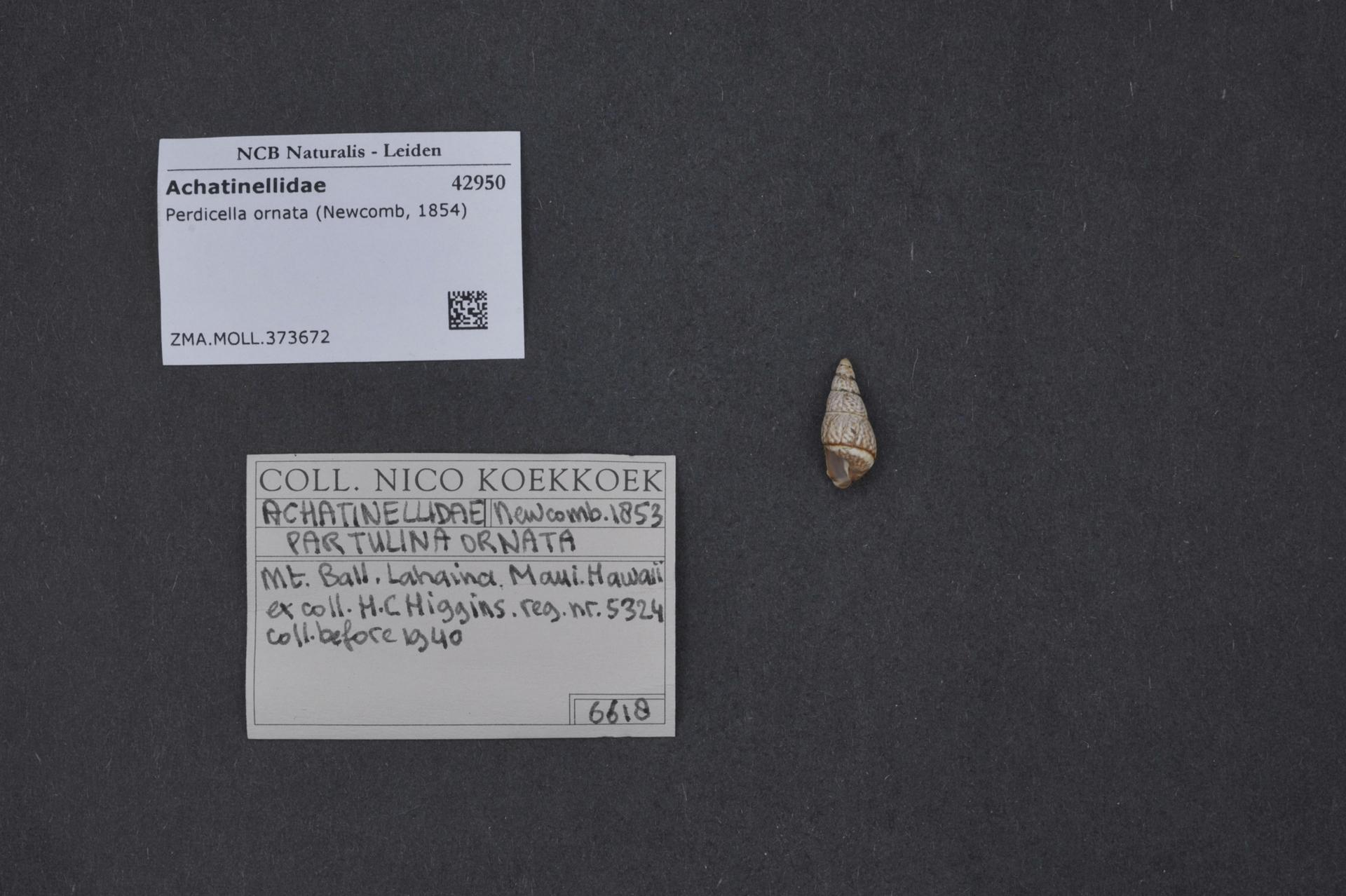

Conservation status
- Data Deficient (IUCN 2.3)

- Critically Imperiled (NatureServe)

Scientific classification
- Kingdom: Animalia
- Phylum: Mollusca
- Class: Gastropoda
- Order: Stylommatophora
- Family: Achatinellidae
- Genus: Perdicella
- Species: P. ornata

Binomial name
- Perdicella ornata (Newcomb, 1854)

= Perdicella ornata =

Species of gastropod

Perdicella ornata is a species of tropical, tree-living, air-breathing, land snails in the family Achatinellidae. This species is endemic to Hawaii in the United States.

== Description ==
P. ornata has a shiny, acutely pyramidal shell with six margined whorls that reaches a height of approximately 1.48 cm. The shell's surface is patterned longitudinally with alternating white and black zigzags. The shell's lips are slightly thick at the edge, and the columella is broad and flattened.

== Distribution and habitat ==
P. ornata is endemic to the island of Maui. In 1853, it was found in the rainforest on Mt. Helu in western Maui, while another population was found in east Maui. In a small area, this species can also be found in a deep ravine behind Lahaina. It thrives in arboreal areas.

== Conservation threats ==
Its global status is G1, indicating that it is critically endangered and at high risk of extinction. It was last reviewed on August 7, 1990. In 1982, only one population was reported from West Maui. Its national status is N1, indicating that it is in grave danger of extinction due to its small population and number of occurrences, limited range, severe threats, and other aspects.

The species' state status is S1, comparable to G1. Threats to P. ornata include over-collection, invasive predators such as Euglandina, Oxychilus, and rats. Another threat is destruction of habitat, possibly due to climate change.

The preservation of these snails and their fragile ecosystems depends heavily on conservation efforts since it is said to be not managed and protected. In order to preserve populations, stop habitat loss, and lessen the effects of climate stress, advocacy for conservation and awareness-building and its importance are crucial. Because of the inspiration that P. ornata's intricate shells provide for art, stories, history, culture, survival, creativity, cultural responsibility, and educational programs, protecting this species measures Maui's ability to steward its lands and its communities.
