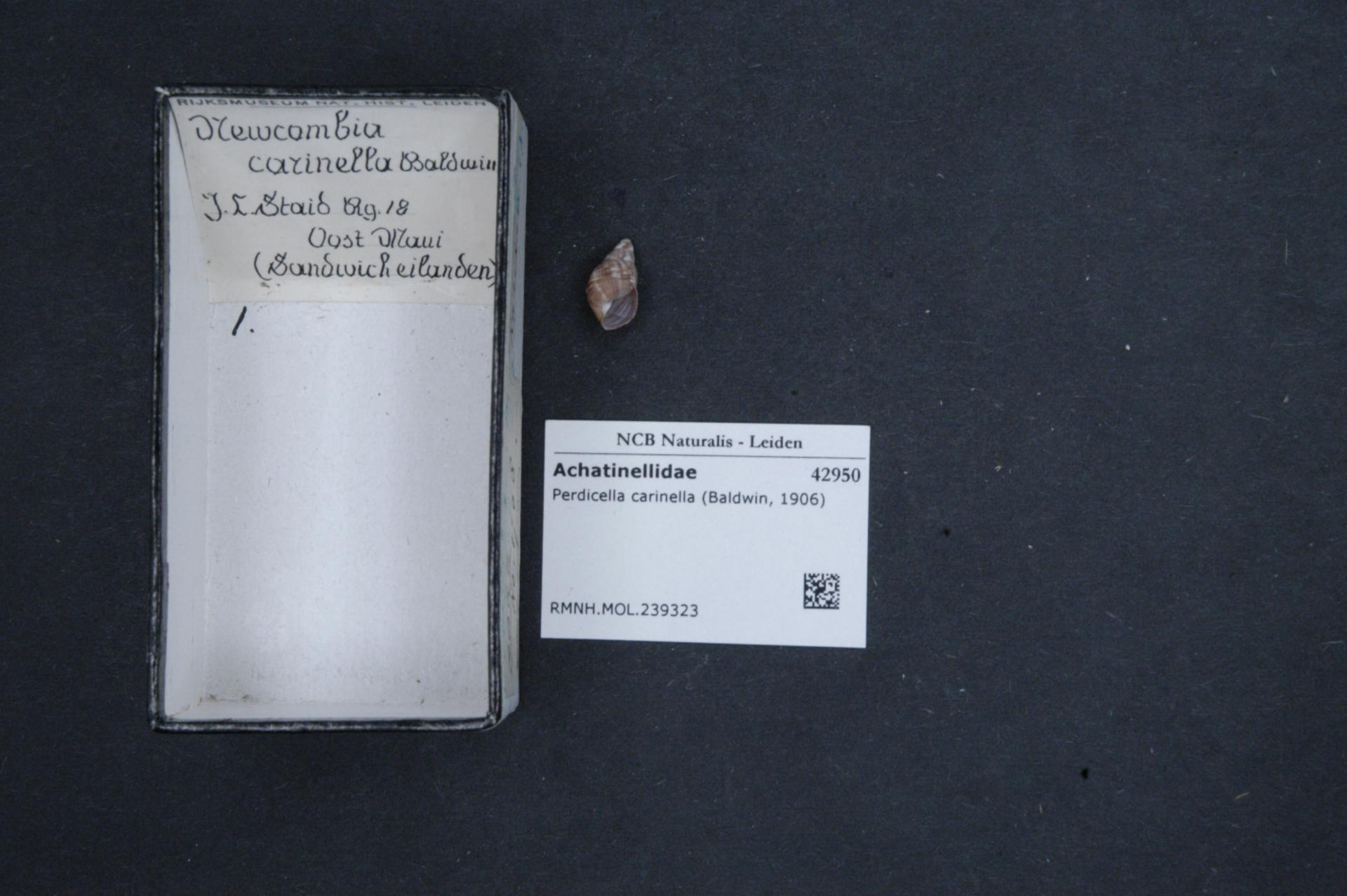
- Perdicella carinella

Scientific classification
- Kingdom: Animalia
- Phylum: Mollusca
- Class: Gastropoda
- Order: Stylommatophora
- Family: Achatinellidae
- Subfamily: Achatinellinae
- Genus: Perdicella; Pease, 1870

= Perdicella =

Genus of gastropods

Perdicella is a genus of tropical air-breathing land snails, terrestrial pulmonate gastropod molluscs in the family Achatinellidae. They are endemic to Hawaii and the majority of the species are extinct.

== Species ==
Species within the genus Perdicella include:

- Perdicella carinella
- † Perdicella fulgurans
- Perdicella helena
- Perdicella kuhnsi
- † Perdicella maniensis
- Perdicella ornata
- † Perdicella zebra
- † Perdicella zebrina

†=extinct
