= Perdicella zebra =

Conservation status
- Extinct (IUCN 2.3)

- Possibly Extinct (NatureServe)

Scientific classification
- Kingdom: Animalia
- Phylum: Mollusca
- Class: Gastropoda
- Order: Stylommatophora
- Family: Achatinellidae
- Genus: Perdicella
- Species: †P. zebra

Binomial name
- †Perdicella zebra (Newcomb, 1855)

Species of gastropod

†Perdicella zebra was a species of tropical tree-living, air-breathing, land snail, an arboreal pulmonate gastropod mollusc in the family Achatinellidae. This species was endemic to Hawaii in the United States.
