= Perdicella fulgurans =

Conservation status
- Extinct (IUCN 2.3)

- Possibly Extinct (NatureServe)

Scientific classification
- Kingdom: Animalia
- Phylum: Mollusca
- Class: Gastropoda
- Order: Stylommatophora
- Family: Achatinellidae
- Genus: Perdicella
- Species: †P. fulgurans

Binomial name
- †Perdicella fulgurans Sykes, 1900

Extinct species of gastropod

Perdicella fulgurans is an extinct species of tropical tree-living, air-breathing, land snail, an arboreal pulmonate gastropod mollusc in the family Achatinellidae.

This species was endemic to Hawaii in the United States.
