= Pantanodon =

Scientific classification
- Kingdom: Animalia
- Phylum: Chordata
- Class: Actinopterygii
- Order: Cyprinodontiformes
- Family: Pantanodontidae
- Genus: Pantanodon; G. S. Myers, 1955

Type species
- Pantanodon podoxys Myers 1955

Genus of fishes

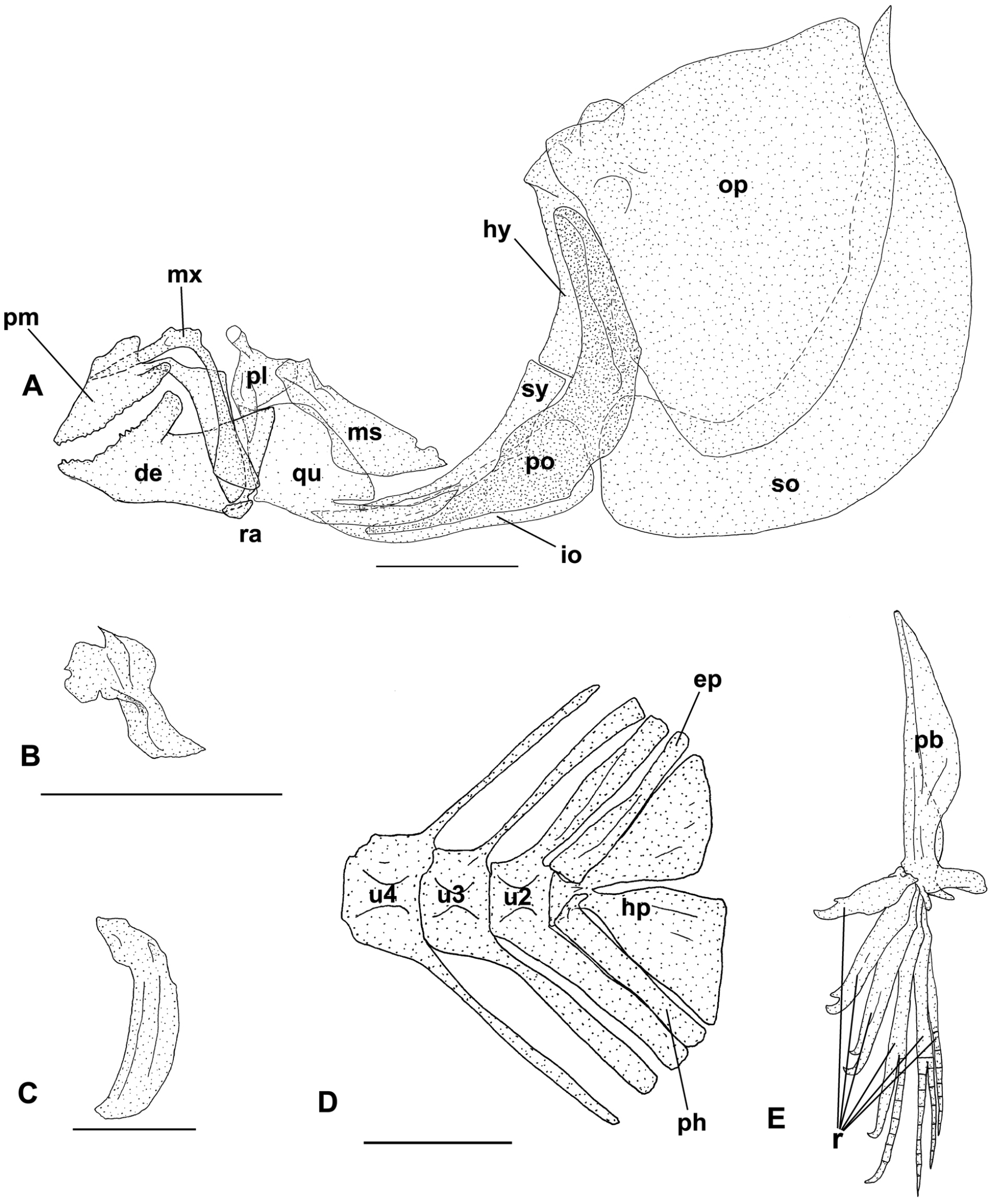
Pantanodon

Pantanodon is a genus of fishes native to East Africa.

== Species ==
There are currently three recognized species in this genus:

- Pantanodon nyingi Huber & Meinema, 2025
- Pantanodon podoxys Myers, 1955
- Pantanodon propinquus Meinema & Huber, 2023
