= Pantanodontidae =

Pantanodontidae Temporal range: Late Oligocene–present

Scientific classification
- Kingdom: Animalia
- Phylum: Chordata
- Class: Actinopterygii
- Order: Cyprinodontiformes
- Suborder: Cyprinodontoidei
- Family: Pantanodontidae; Myers, 1955

Type species
- Pantanodon podoxys Myers, 1955

Genera
- Aliteranodon; Eremodon; †Malagodon; Pantanodon; †Paralebias

Family of fishes

Pantanodontidae, the spine killifishes, is a family of killifish in the suborder Cyprinodontoidei. It is the most basal member of the suborder, being the sister to all other members of the clade. It contains about 13 species in 4 genera which are native to freshwater and estuarine habitats of East Africa, including at least formerly Madagascar. In addition, several fossil members of this group are known to have inhabited Europe. Many species have extremely small ranges and some are likely extinct.

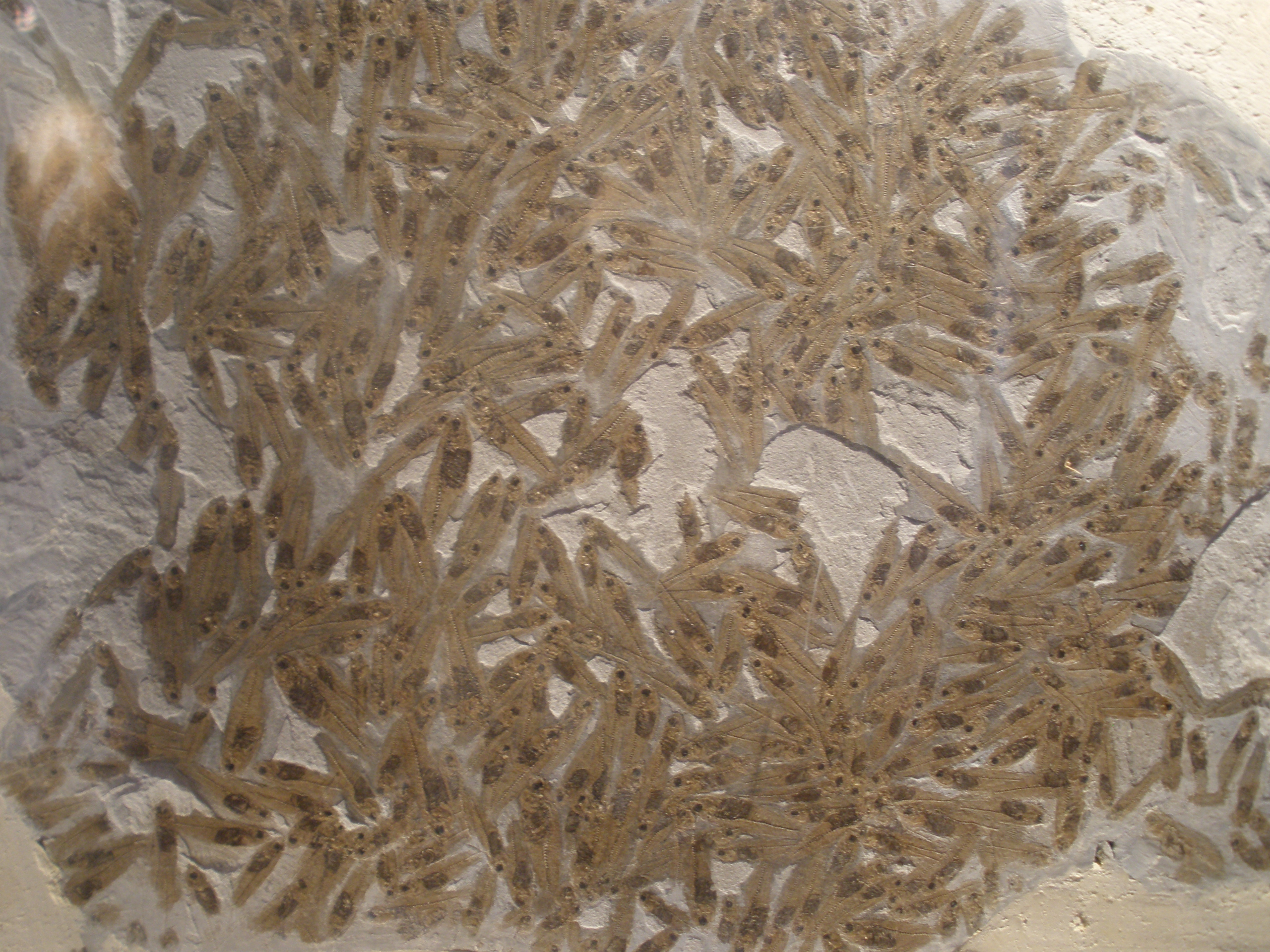
Fossil mass death assemblage of Paralebias, Aix-en-Provence (Late Oligocene of France)

The following genera are known:

- Aliteranodon Meinema & Huber, 2023
- Eremodon Huber & Meinema, 2024
- †Malagodon Meinema & Huber, 2023 (extinct ca. 1990s)
- Pantanodon G. S. Myers, 1955

The fossil genus †Paralebias Gaudant, 2013 is known from the Late Oligocene and Early Miocene of Europe. It is sometimes synonymized with Pantanodon, although this was done prior to the splitting up of the genus. Paralebias itself may be polyphyletic.

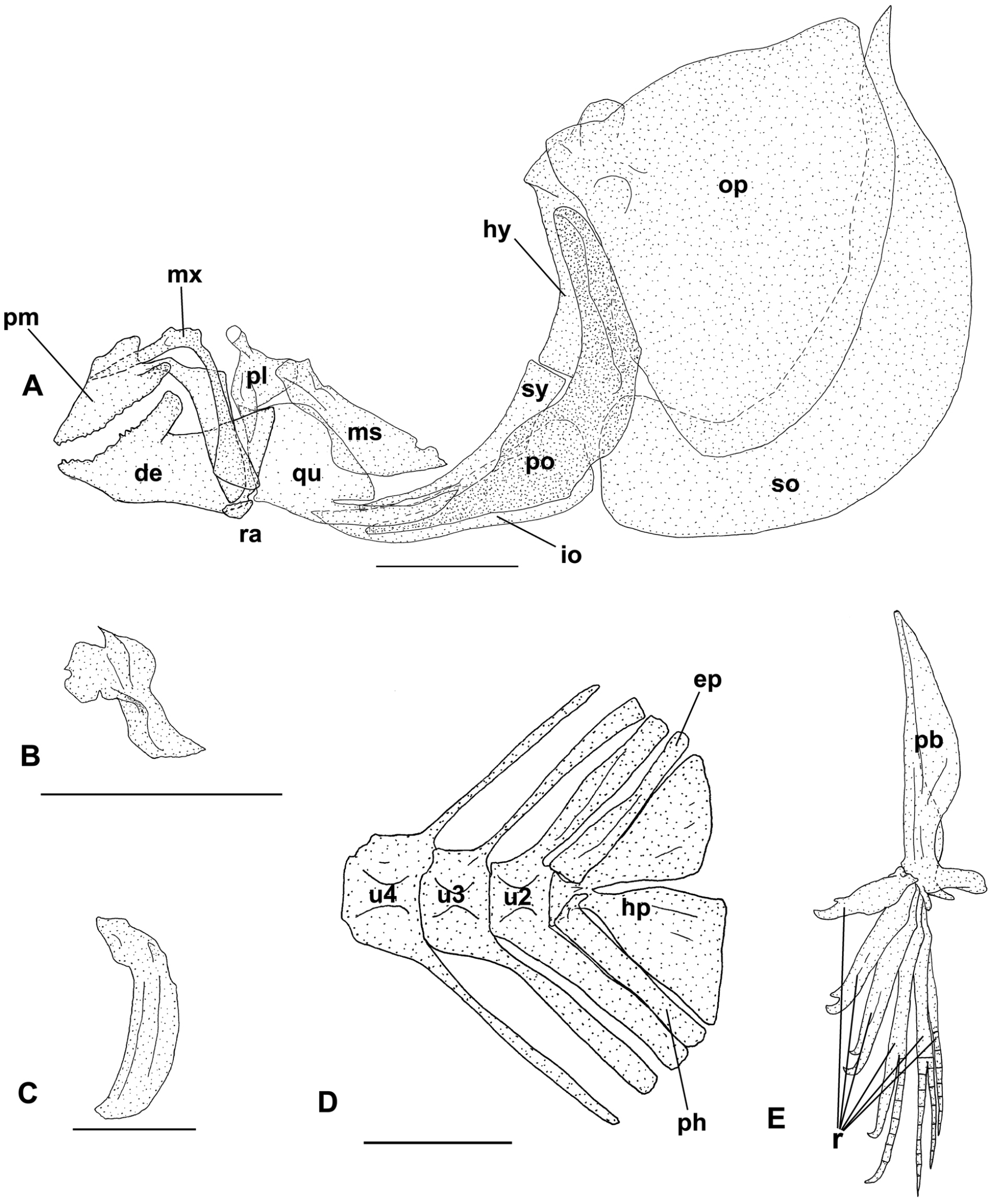
Anatomy of Pantanodon
