= List of Oceanian species extinct in the Holocene =

Map of Oceania

This is a list of Oceanian species extinct in the Holocene that covers extinctions from the Holocene epoch, a geologic epoch that began about 11,650 years before present (about 9700 BCE) (Note: The source gives "11,700 calendar yr b2k (before CE 2000)". But "BP" means "before CE 1950". Therefore, the Holocene began 11,650 BP. Doing the math, that is c. 9700 BCE.) and continues to the present day.

Oceania is a geographical region in the Pacific Ocean comprising Australasia, Melanesia, Micronesia, and Polynesia. Numerous species across Oceania became extinct as humans moved across the Pacific. Australia-New Guinea, New Zealand, and Hawaii have particularly large numbers of extinct species, so they listed in separate articles.

Extinctions from remaining Oceanian islands are listed below. This list includes sovereign states (such as Fiji) as well as island territories (such as French Polynesia). Extinctions from the associated states and dependent territory of New Zealand are listed below, and not with New Zealand proper. Papua New Guinea's Autonomous Region of Bougainville (part of the Solomon Islands archipelago) is included below, although the rest of Papua New Guinea is covered in List of Australia-New Guinea species extinct in the Holocene.

Extinctions in Easter Island, a territory of Chile, are included, but extinctions in the Juan Fernández Islands are included in the List of South American species extinct in the Holocene, and extinctions in the Galapagos Islands are in their own separate List of Galapagos Islands species extinct in the Holocene, as neither archipelago was ever settled by Polynesians and are not usually considered part of Oceania. Similarly, the Daito and Bonin Islands, under the sovereignty of Japan, are considered in the List of Asian animals extinct in the Holocene.

Many extinction dates are unknown due to a lack of relevant information.

== Mammals (class Mammalia) ==
=== Rodents (order Rodentia) ===
==== Old World rats and mice (family Muridae) ====
Common name	Scientific name	Range	Comments
Buka Island mosaic-tailed rat	Melomys spechti	Buka Island, Autonomous Region of Bougainville	Most recent remains dated to 3050 BCE.
Buka Island solomys	Solomys spriggsarum	Buka Island, Autonomous Region of Bougainville	Most recent remains dated to 3050 BCE.

===== Possibly extinct =====
Common name	Scientific name	Range	Comments
Emperor rat	Uromys imperator	Aola, northern Guadalcanal, Solomon Islands	Not recorded with certainty since it was last collected between 1886 and 1888, though anecdotal information suggests the species survived until the 1960s. The causes of extinction are unknown.
Guadalcanal rat	Uromys porculus	Aola, northern Guadalcanal, Solomon Islands	Not recorded since it was last collected between 1886 and 1888. The causes of extinction are unknown.

=== Bats (order Chiroptera) ===
==== Megabats (family Pteropodidae) ====
Common name	Scientific name	Range	Comments
Nendo tube-nosed fruit bat	Nyctimene sanctacrucis	Nendö, Solomon Islands	Only known from the holotype collected in 1892; it was later erronoeusly reported as recorded in 1907. Could be conspecific with the Island tube-nosed fruit bat.
Small Samoan flying fox	Pteropus allenorum	Upolu, Samoa	Only known from the holotype collected in 1856.
Large Samoan flying fox	Pteropus coxi	Samoa	Known from two individuals collected between 1839 and 1841. The exact island of origin is unknown because it was not recorded, but unconfirmed sightings happened until the 1980s.
Large Palau flying fox	Pteropus pilosus	Palau	Known from two individuals collected before 1874. The causes of extinction are unknown.
Guam flying fox	Pteropus tokudae	Guam	Last known individual was killed in 1968, with an unconfirmed sighting happening in the late 1970s. It was probably hunted to extinction, though the introduced brown tree snake could have contributed.

===== Possibly extinct =====
Common name	Scientific name	Range	Comments
Montane monkey-faced bat	Pteralopex pulchra	Mount Makarakomburu, Guadalcanal, Solomon Islands	Only known from the holotype collected in 1991. The causes of extinction are unknown.

==== Vesper bats (family Vespertilionidae) ====
Common name	Scientific name	Range	Comments
Insular myotis	Myotis insularum	Samoa	Last recorded in the 1860s.

== Birds (class Aves) ==
=== Landfowl and relatives (clade Pangalliformes) ===
==== Giant scrubfowl (family Sylviornithidae) ====
Common name	Scientific name	Range	Comments	Images
Noble scrubfowl	Megavitiornis altirostris	Fiji	Most recent remains at the Naigani Lapita culture site dated to 950 BCE. Flightless and totally terrestrial, it would have been quickly exterminated by humans and introduced mammals.	
New Caledonian giant scrubfowl	Sylviornis neocaledoniae	Grande Terre and Isle of Pines, New Caledonia	Most recent remains at the Pindai Caves dated to 1120-840 BCE. The species was flightless and laid a single egg uncovered on the ground, which wasn't incubated. This made it easy prey for introduced predators.	

==== Megapodes (family Megapodidae) ====
Common name	Scientific name	Range	Comments
Consumed scrubfowl	Megapodius alimentum	Tonga and Fiji	Dated in Fiji around 850 BCE and in Tongoleleka, Lifuka Island to 840-740 BCE. It retained the ability to fly despite being almost as large as New Caledonia's pile-builder megapode. Nevertheless, it went extinct a couple of centuries after human settlement as a result of hunting, egg harvesting, and predation by introduced animals.
Viti Levu scrubfowl	Megapodius amissus	Aiwa Levu, Fiji	Likely flightless unlike other small megapodes, which would make it vulnerable to introduced predators.
Pile-builder megapode	Megapodius molistructor	New Caledonia	Most recent remains at the Pindai Caves dated to 86-428 CE. It was the largest species of its genus and almost certainly hunted to extinction by humans. Megapodius andersoni, a hypothetical species named from a brief description written by William Anderson during the third voyage of James Cook (1776–1780), may or may not be the same animal. Remains provisionally assigned to this species in Tonga are different enough to represent another species, or even genus.
Unidentified Tongan megapode	Megapodius sp.	Tonga	A large megapode similar to M. molistructor of New Caledonia, but likely a different species or even genus. Lived alongside, but was rarer than the smaller M. alimentum.
Large Solomon Islands megapode	Megapodius sp.	Buka Island, Autonomous Region of Bougainville	Prehistoric
Lini's megapode	Mwalau walterlinii	Efate, Vanuatu	Described from remains found in Lapita culture levels dating to 1050-850 BCE. It could fly despite being larger than any extant megapode.

===== Locally extinct =====
Common name	Scientific name	Range	Comments	Pictures
Dusky megapode	Megapodius freycinet	From the Maluku Islands to Tonga	Currently only present from the Maluku Islands to the Bird's Head Peninsula on New Guinea. It survived in Tikopia, Solomon Islands until the Lapita period.	

==== Pheasants and allies (family Phasianidae) ====
===== Locally extinct =====
Common name	Scientific name	Range	Comments	Pictures
Stubble quail	Coturnix pectoralis	Australia and New Caledonia	Extirpated from New Caledonia after human settlement.	

=== Waterfowl (order Anseriformes) ===
==== Ducks, geese, and swans (family Anatidae) ====
Common name	Scientific name	Range	Comments	Pictures
Tristram's pintail	Anas acuta modesta	Sidney Island, Phoenix Islands, Kiribati	Extinct subspecies or population of the northern pintail, known from three individuals collected in 1885.	
Rennell Island teal	Anas gibberifrons remissa	Rennell, Solomon Islands	Restricted to a single lagoon in the island, it disappeared in 1959 after Tilapia fish was introduced and presumably destroyed its food supply.	
Mariana mallard	Anas platyrhynchos oustaleti	Guam, Tinian, and Saipan, Mariana Islands	A captive breeding program intended to save it from extinction ended in failure with the death of the last individual (pictured) in 1981.	
Coues's gadwall	Mareca strepera couesi	Teraina, Line Islands, Kiribati	A sedentary subspecies likely descended from stranded birds. It was never seen alive again after its discovery in 1874.	
Rota flightless duck	Anatidae incertae sedis	Rota, Mariana Islands	Described from a subfossil juvenile coracoid.	

=== Nightjars (order Caprimulgiformes) ===
==== Typical nightjars (family Caprimulgidae) ====
===== Possibly extinct =====
Common name	Scientific name	Range	Comments
New Caledonian nightjar	Eurostopodus exul	Northwestern New Caledonia	Known only from the type specimen collected in 1939.

=== Owlet-nightjars (order Aegotheliformes) ===
==== Owlet-nightjars (family Aegothelidae) ====
===== Possibly extinct =====
Common name	Scientific name	Range	Comments	Pictures
New Caledonian owlet-nightjar	Aegotheles savesi	Southwestern New Caledonia	Last known individual was shot in 1960, and an unconfirmed sighting and calls were recorded in 1998. Like other owlet-nightjars, it could have declined due to predation by introduced cats and rats, and habitat loss through fire, mining, and logging.	

=== Swifts, treeswifts, and hummingbirds (order Apodiformes) ===
==== Swifts (family Apodidae) ====
Common name	Scientific name	Range	Comments
Mangaia swiftlet	Aerodramus manuoi	Mangaia, Cook Islands	Known from Holocene remains.

=== Pigeons and doves (order Columbiformes) ===
==== Pigeons and doves (family Columbidae) ====
Common name	Scientific name	Range	Comments	Pictures
Henderson archaic pigeon	Bountyphaps obsoleta	Henderson Island, Pitcairn, and the Gambier Islands of French Polynesia	Most recent remains from Polynesian middens dated to 1000-1600 CE. It was the largest pigeon in Henderson and a poor flier but not flightless. It was likely hunted to extinction.	
Kanaka pigeon	Caloenas canacorum	New Caledonia; possibly Vanuatu and Fiji	Most recent remains at the Pindai Caves dated to 86-428 CE. It was likely hunted to extinction. Remains provisionally assigned to this taxon in Tonga likely belong to a different species.	
Unidentified Tongan pigeon	Caloenas sp.	Tonga	Known from subfossil remains.	
Spotted green pigeon	Caloenas maculata	unknown, possibly Tahiti, French Polynesia	Known from two specimens of unknown origin that were collected in 1783 and 1823, believed to have come from somewhere in the Pacific Ocean. Its coloration suggests that it was a forest-dweller, and its short and rounded wings that it evolved in a predator-free island. 1928 native accounts of a bird in Tahiti may refer to this species. It could have disappeared due to hunting or introduced predators before extensive European exploration of the Pacific.	
Vava'u pigeon	Columba vitiensis ssp.	Vava'u Islands, Tonga	Only known from John Latham's 1823 description.	
Tongan tooth-billed pigeon	Didunculus placopedetes	Tonga	Most recent remains dated to 900-750 BCE.	
David's imperial pigeon	Ducula david	Ouvéa Island, New Caledonia	Most recent remains at Utuleve dated to 550-50 BCE.	
Henderson imperial pigeon	Ducula harrisoni	Henderson Island, Pitcairn	Most recent remains dated to 1000-1600 CE.	
Lakeba pigeon	Ducula lakeba	Lakeba and Aiwa Levu, Fiji	Most recent remains dated to around 850 BCE.	
Shutler's fruit pigeon	Ducula shutleri	Tonga	Known from subfossil remains dated to 855-730 BCE. It was hunted to extinction shortly after the first humans arrived in Tonga.	
	Ducula tihonireasini	Kamaka, Gambier Islands, French Polynesia	Most recent remains dated to 950-1350 AD.	
Rota large ground dove	Gallicolumba sp.	Rota, Mariana Islands	Known from subfossil remains. Coexisted with the smaller Micronesian pigeon, now extirpated from the Marianas.	
Huahine cuckoo-dove	Macropygia arevarevauupa	Huahine, Society Islands, French Polynesia	Most recent remains at Fa'ahia dated to 700-1150 CE.	
Marquesas cuckoo-dove	Macropygia heana	Nuku Hiva and Ua Huka, Marquesas Islands	Most recent remains at Hane, Ua Huka dated to 300-1200 CE.	
Choiseul pigeon	Microgoura meeki	Choiseul, and speculatively Bougainville and Malaita, Solomon Islands	Not recorded since 1904; more recent observations are believed to be confusions with other doves and pigeons. It was probably exterminated by introduced dogs and cats.	
Viti Levu giant pigeon	Natunaornis gigoura	Viti Levu, Fiji	Known from subfossil remains. It was the third largest pigeon ever after the dodo and Rodrigues solitaire, flightless and adapted to eat large fruit, seeds, and insects on the ground. Like the former, it would have been extremely vulnerable to hunting and introduced mammals predating on its eggs and chicks.	
Mangaia ground dove	Pampusana erythroptera ssp.	Mangaia, Cook Islands	Known from subfossil remains.	
Society Islands ground dove	Pampusana erythroptera ssps.	Moorea and Tahiti, French Polynesia	Known from a few specimens collected between 1768 and 1779 (mostly lost), paintings and descriptions. Differences in the paintings suggest that they represent two undescribed subspecies. Two other subspecies were described in the Tuamotu Islands, where at least one survives.	
Tanna ground dove	Pampusana ferruginea	Tanna Island, Vanuatu	Only known from a 1774 painting by Georg Forster.	
Henderson ground dove	Pampusana leonpascoi	Henderson Island, Pitcairn	Most recent remains dated to 1000-1600 CE.	
New Caledonian ground dove	Pampusana longitarsus	New Caledonia	Most recent remains at the Pindai Caves dated to 86-428.	
Great ground dove	Pampusana nui	Marquesas, Cook, Society, and Tuamotu Islands	Most recent remains in Mangaia dated to 1390-1470 CE.	
Thick-billed ground dove	Pampusana salamonis	Makira and Ramos, Solomon Islands	Known from one individual collected in Makira in 1882 and another from Ramos in 1927. Likely declined due to hunting, predation by introduced rats and cats, and habitat destruction.	
Red-moustached fruit dove	Ptilinopus mercierii	Nuku Hiva and Hiva Oa, Marquesa Islands, French Polynesia	Only recorded in Nuku Hiva when the holotype was collected between 1836 and 1839, and last recorded in Hiva Oa in 1922. A record from 1980 was mistaken. Disappeared due to predation by introduced great horned owls, cats, and rats.	
Ebon Island fruit dove	Ptilinopus porphyraceus marshallianus	Ebon, Marshall Islands	Described from a museum specimen in 1928. Possibly mentioned in a 1861 text.	
Mauke fruit dove	Ptilinopus rarotongensis byronensis	Mauke, Cook Islands	Only known from a 1825 description by Andrew Bloxam.	
	Ptilinopus sp.	Gambier Islands, French Polynesia	Recorded during the 19th and 20th centuries but not collected. Its existence was confirmed later by the finding of subfossil remains in Taravai.	
Tongan giant pigeon	Tongoenas burleyi	Tonga	Most recent remains dated to 850-600 BCE. Hunted to extinction shortly after humans arrived in Tonga.	
	Columbidae indet.	Kamaka, Gambier Islands, French Polynesia	Unidentified subfossil bones possibly belonging to Macropygia.	

===== Possibly extinct =====
Common name	Scientific name	Range	Comments	Pictures
White-headed Polynesian ground dove	Pampusana erythroptera albicollis	Hao, Hiti, and possibly Tahanea, French Polynesia	Last sighted in the 1950s. Disappeared due to predation by introduced cats and rats.	

===== Locally extinct =====
Common name	Scientific name	Range	Comments	Pictures
Tongan ground dove	Pampusana stairi	From Wallis and Futuna to New Caledonia	Extirpated from New Caledonia after human settlement.	

=== Rails and cranes (order Gruiformes) ===
==== Rails (family Rallidae) ====
Common name	Scientific name	Range	Comments	Pictures
Solomon Islands bare-eyed rail	Gymnocrex plumbeiventris intactus	Solomon Islands	Only known from the holotype.	
Nuku Hiva rail	Hypotaenidia epulare	Nuku Hiva, Marquesas Islands	Most recent remains dated to around 950 CE. The remains were found in middens along with other vertebrate bones and shells of animals consumed by Polynesians. It was probably hunted to extinction.	
Ua Huka rail	Hypotaenidia gracilitibia	Ua Huka, Marquesas Islands	Most recent remains dated to around 600 CE.	
Niue rail	Hypotaenidia huiatua	Niue	Known from subfossil remains predating human settlement, but believed to have been driven to extinction by hunting or anthropogenic changes to its environment.	
Tongatapu rail	Hypotaenidia hypoleucus	Tongatapu, Tonga	Known from John Latham's 1785 description of birds collected by William Anderson during the third voyage of James Cook (1776–1780). The species was likely exterminated by feral dogs introduced by Cook's previous visit in 1773.	
Tahiti rail	Hypotaenidia pacifica	Tahiti and Mehetia, Society Islands, French Polynesia	Last reported in Tahiti in 1844 and in Mehetia in the 1930s. It was flightless. Its extinction was presumably caused by introduced cats and rats.	
Tinian rail	Hypotaenidia pendiculentus	Tinian, Mariana Islands	Known from subfossil remains.	
Aguijan rail	Hypotaenidia pisonii	Aguijan, Mariana Islands	Known from subfossil remains, nearly all of which show charring from cooking fires.	
Bar-winged rail	Hypotaenidia poeciloptera	Viti Levu and Ovalau, Fiji	Last seen with certainty before 1890. There were unconfirmed sightings in Taveuni in 1971, and in Waisa, Viti Levu in 1973. It was possibly exterminated by introduced cats and mongooses.	
Mangaia rail	Hypotaenidia ripleyi	Mangaia, Cook Islands	Known from subfossil remains. Likely extinct due to hunting, habitat alteration, and introduction of mammalian predators. Disappeared following the arrival of humans to the island, some one thousand years ago.	
Tahuata rail	Hypotaenidia roletti	Tahuata, Marquesas Islands	Most recent remains dated to around 950 CE. One of only two known rails from eastern Polynesia, it was likely flightless and had robust legs adapted to a terrestrial lifestyle. As a result, it would have been extremely vulnerable to humans and introduced predators.	
Tubuai rail	Hypotaenidia steadmani	Tubuai, Austral Islands, French Polynesia	Known from subfossil remains. It possibly disappeared around 1300 CE, soon after the arrival of Polynesians.	
Huahine rail	Hypotaenidia storrsolsoni	Huahine, Society Islands, French Polynesia	Most recent remains at Fa'ahia dated to 700-1150 CE. Its remains were found in Polynesian middens, and it likely disappeared due to hunting or predation by introduced mammals.	
Rota rail	Hypotaenidia temptatus	Rota, Mariana Islands	Known from subfossil remains.	
Vava'u rail	Hypotaenidia vavauensis	Vava'u, Tonga	Depicted alive by the Malaspina Expedition in 1793. Its existence was confirmed with the finding of Lapita culture remains between 2004 and 2014.	
Eua rail	Hypotaenidia vekamatolu	ʻEua, Tonga	Known from subfossil remains. It disappeared between the arrival of Polynesians around 1300 and Europeans in 1800.	
Wake Island rail	Hypotaenidia wakensis	Wake and Wilkes Island	Last recorded in 1945. Likely hunted to extinction by besieged Japanese Empire troops during the World War II occupation of Wake Island.	
Hiva Oa rail	Hypotaenidia sp.	Hiva Oa, Marquesas Islands	One of only two rail species from eastern Polynesia. It was flightless.	
New Caledonian gallinule	Porphyrio kukwiedei	New Caledonia	Most recent remains at the Pindai Caves dated to 86-428 CE. A possible native name, n'dino, was recorded in 1860.	
Huahine swamphen	Porphyrio mcnabi	Huahine, Society Islands, French Polynesia	Most recent remains at Fa'ahia dated to 700-1150 CE.	
Marquesas swamphen	Porphyrio paepae	Hiva Oa and Tahuata, Marquesas Islands, French Polynesia	Though described from subfossil remains, it could have survived until the 20th century on account of a gallinule depicted being hunted by a dog on the 1902 painting Le Sorcier d'Hiva Oa, by Paul Gauguin. Thor Heyerdahl also observed a similar bird in 1937.	
Rota swamphen	Porphyrio sp.	Rota, Mariana Islands	Known from subfossil remains.	
Viti Levu rail	Vitirallus watlingi	Viti Levu, Fiji	Known from subfossil remains. It was apparently restricted to lowlands, which would be more susceptible to fires. Likely disappeared due to hunting, habitat destruction, and predation by introduced mammals like the Polynesian rat.	
Kosrae crake	Zapornia monasa	Kosrae, Micronesia	Known from two individuals collected in 1827 and 1828. Considered sacred by the natives and not hunted, it likely disappeared due to predation by rats, which were plentiful by the time ornithologists fruitlessly searched for the bird again, in 1880.	
Tahiti crake	Zapornia nigra	Tahiti, Society Islands, and possibly Mangaia, Cook Islands	Depicted by Georg Forster during Cook's second voyage (1772–1775); John Frederick Miller's more famous painting from 1784 is a copy. It disappeared soon after from Tahiti but it or a similar species (different from Zapornia rua) could have survived in Mangaia until recently.	
Mangaia crake	Zapornia rua	Mangaia, Cook Islands	Known from subfossil remains. Disappeared following the arrival of humans to Mangaia, some one thousand years ago.	
Easter Island crake	Zapornia sp.	Easter Island, Chile	Disappeared between 1000 and 1430 CE.	
Buka swamphen	Porphyrio sp.	Buka Island, Autonomous Region of Bougainville	Prehistoric	
Easter Island rail	Rallidae incertae sedis	Easter Island, Chile	Disappeared between 1000 and 1430 CE.	
Unidentified Tongan rail	Rallidae incertae sedis	Tonga	A species of size intermediate between H. vavauensis and H. philippensis, dated to 855-730 BCE.	

===== Possibly extinct =====
Common name	Scientific name	Range	Comments	Pictures
New Caledonian rail	Gallirallus lafresnayanus	New Caledonia	Not seen with certainty since 1890 and likely extirpated by predation from introduced rats, cats, and pigs. However, unconfirmed sightings in the 1960s and 1984 may hint to its survival in montane forests inaccessible to such predators.	
Samoan wood rail	Pareudiastes pacificus	Savai'i, Samoa	Last seen in 1873 and likely extirpated by hunting and predation by introduced rats, cats, dogs, and pigs.	
Makira woodhen	Pareudiastes silvestris	Makira, Solomon Islands	Described from the holotype collected in 1929, though unconfirmed sightings have been reported until 2002. It likely declined due to introduced predators like cats, dogs, and electric ants.	

===== Extinct in the wild =====
Common name	Scientific name	Range	Comments	Pictures
Guam rail	Hypotaenidia owstoni	Guam	Extirpated from the wild in 1987, as a result of predation by introduced brown tree snakes. Following a captive breeding program, it was reintroduced to the smaller offshore islands of Rota and Cocos in 2010, but only the Cocos population is self-sustaining.	

===== Locally extinct =====
Common name	Scientific name	Range	Comments	Pictures
Lewin's rail	Lewinia pectoralis	Australia, Wallacea, New Guinea, and New Caledonia	Extirpated from New Caledonia after human settlement.	

=== Shorebirds (order Charadriiformes) ===
==== Sandpipers (family Scolopacidae) ====
Common name	Scientific name	Range	Comments	Pictures
Viti Levu snipe	Coenocorypha miratropica	Viti Levu, Fiji	Known from subfossil remains. Probably disappeared due to predation by introduced pigs, dogs, and Polynesian rats.	
New Caledonian snipe	Coenocorypha neocaledonica	New Caledonia	Known from two subfossil humeri and a coracoid. Probably driven to extinction by introduced rats.	
Christmas sandpiper	Prosobonia cancellata	Kiritimati, Kiribati	Only known from the type, collected in 1778 and subsequently lost. It was probably exterminated by invasive cats.	
Moorea sandpiper	Prosobonia ellisi	Moorea, Society Islands, French Polynesia	Only known from two paintings based on individuals collected during Cook's third voyage in 1777, and subsequently lost. Some authors suggest it was the same species as the Tahiti sandpiper, while others defend its specific status on plumage differences. In the absence of specimens, the species must be considered dubious. It was probably exterminated by invasive mammals, though habitat destruction could have been another factor.	
Tahiti sandpiper	Prosobonia leucoptera	Tahiti, Society Islands, French Polynesia	Known from an individual collected during Cook's voyage in 1773. It could have been driven to extinction by habitat destruction caused by invasive pigs and goats, or predation by rats.	

==== Gulls, terns, and skimmers (family Laridae) ====
Common name	Scientific name	Range	Comments
Huahine gull	Chroicocephalus utunui	Huahine, Society Islands, French Polynesia	Most recent remains dated to 700-1150 CE. It could have disappeared due to hunting, habitat loss, disease, or predation from introduced mammals.

==== Buttonquails (family Turnicidae) ====
Common name	Scientific name	Range	Comments
New Caledonian buttonquail	Turnix novaecaledoniae	New Caledonia	Last collected in 1911. Studies of owl pellets are consistent with a gradual decline over time and extinction shortly after its description. Deforestation through burning and introduced mammals could have contributed to its extinction.

=== Boobies, cormorants, and allies (order Suliformes) ===
==== Boobies and gannets (family Sulidae) ====
Common name	Scientific name	Range	Comments
Ua Huka booby	Papasula abbotti costelloi	Ua Huka and Tahuata, Marquesas Islands	Only known from subfossil remains at archaeological middens, indicating that it was regularly hunted by Polynesians before its extinction around 1200 CE. It was larger than Abbott's booby and may be a different species. It probably nested only in tall trees, like Abbott's booby, which would also make it vulnerable to habitat destruction.

===== Locally extinct =====
Common name	Scientific name	Range	Comments	Pictures
Abbott's booby	Papasula abbotti abbotti	Indian Ocean to Micronesia and Melanesia	Only found in the present on Christmas Island, an Australian dependency southwest of Indonesia. Subfossil remains are known from Tikopia, Solomon Islands and Efate, Vanuatu. A vagrant female was photographed in Rota, Northern Mariana Islands in 2007.	

=== Pelicans, herons, and ibises (order Pelecaniformes) ===
==== Herons (family Ardeidae) ====
Common name	Scientific name	Range	Comments
Easter Island heron	cf. Egretta sp.	Easter Island, Chile	Disappeared around 1000-1430 CE.
Niue night heron	Nycticorax kalavikai	Niue	Most recent remains at Anakuli Cave dated to 2550-1550 BCE. It likely disappeared due to hunting and predation by introduced mammals.
	Nycticorax sp.	Tonga	Known from subfossil remains.

=== Hawks and relatives (order Accipitriformes) ===
==== Hawks, eagles, kites, harriers and Old World vultures (family Accipitridae) ====
Common name	Scientific name	Range	Comments
Powerful goshawk	Accipiter efficax	New Caledonia	Two species most recently dated to 86-428 CE at the Pindai Caves. The reason of extinction is unknown, as New Caledonia is today home to two other Accipiter species, the brown goshawk and the white-bellied goshawk. However, the extinct and extant species not being found together could indicate that they lived in different habitats, or that the extant species colonized the island after the others disappeared.
Gracile goshawk	Accipiter quartus	New Caledonia	Two species most recently dated to 86-428 CE at the Pindai Caves. The reason of extinction is unknown, as New Caledonia is today home to two other Accipiter species, the brown goshawk and the white-bellied goshawk. However, the extinct and extant species not being found together could indicate that they lived in different habitats, or that the extant species colonized the island after the others disappeared.
Vanuatu hawk	Accipiter sp.	Vanuatu	Known from subfossil remains. Became extinct after the arrival of the Lapita peoples.

=== Owls (order Strigiformes) ===
==== True owls (family Strigidae) ====
===== Locally extinct =====
Common name	Scientific name	Range	Comments	Images
Morepork	Ninox novaeseelandiae	New Caledonia, Lord Howe Island, Norfolk Island, and New Zealand	Extirpated from New Caledonia after human settlement.	

==== Barn-owls (family Tytonidae) ====
Common name	Scientific name	Range	Comments
New Caledonian barn owl	Tyto letocarti	New Caledonia	Almost entirely dependent on reptiles, it became extinct when reptile numbers crashed after the colonization of New Caledonia by humans and the Polynesian rat. The island was later colonized by the common barn owl (T. alba), whose diet is rodent-based.

=== Hornbills and hoopoes (order Bucerotiformes) ===
==== Hornbills (family Bucerotidae) ====
Common name	Scientific name	Range	Comments
Lifou hornbill	Aceros sp.	Lifou, Loyalty Islands, New Caledonia	Known from subfossil remains in archaeological middens. It might have been hunted to extinction, or become extinct due to predation by Polynesian rats.

=== Kingfishers and relatives (order Coraciiformes) ===
==== Kingfishers (family Alcedinidae) ====
Common name	Scientific name	Range	Comments
Mangareva kingfisher	Todiramphus gambieri gambieri	Mangareva, Gambier Islands	Probably extinct before 1922.

===== Extinct in the wild =====
Common name	Scientific name	Range	Comments	Pictures
Guam kingfisher	Todiramphus cinnamominus	Guam	Following catastrophic predation by the introduced brown tree snake, the last 29 individuals were caught in 1986 and taken to the United States, where there are over a hundred now in captivity.	

=== Parrots (order Psittaciformes) ===
==== Old World parrots (family Psittaculidae) ====
Common name	Scientific name	Range	Comments	Pictures
Kotzebue's lorikeet	Charmosyna samoensis	Samoa	Only known from Otto von Kotzebue's 1830 description.	
Raiatea parakeet	Cyanoramphus ulietanus	Raiatea, Society Islands, French Polynesia	Known from two individuals generally believed to have been collected during Cook's second voyage in 1773 or 1774, though 1777 during the third voyage is also possible.	
Black-fronted parakeet	Cyanoramphus zealandicus	Tahiti, Society Islands, French Polynesia	Last collected in 1844. It could have become extinct due to habitat loss, hunting, or predation by introduced species.	
Oceanic eclectus	Eclectus infectus	'Eua, Lifuka, Uiha, and Vava'u in Tonga; possibly also Vanuatu and Fiji	Described from subfossil remains. A live bird from Vava'u was likely depicted by members of the Malaspina Expedition in 1793. It presumably became extinct soon after due to hunting and predation by introduced mammals.	
Sinoto's lorikeet	Vini sinotoi	Marquesas and Society Islands	Most recent remains dated to 810-1025 CE. It could have become extinct due to predation by Polynesian rats.	
Conquered lorikeet	Vini vidivici	Marquesas, Society, and Cook Islands	Most recent remains dated to 1000-1200 CE. It could have become extinct due to predation by Polynesian rats.	
Easter Island parrots	Psittaciformes incertae sedis	Easter Island, Chile	Two species extinct between 1000 and 1430 CE.	

===== Possibly extinct =====
Common name	Scientific name	Range	Comments	Pictures
New Caledonian lorikeet	Charmosyna diadema	New Caledonia	Known from two individuals collected before 1860. It was reported as existing in Oubatche in 1913, and an unconfirmed sighting southwest of Mount Panié was made in 1976.	

=== Perching birds (order Passeriformes) ===
==== Pittas (family Pittidae) ====
===== Possibly extinct =====
Common name	Scientific name	Range	Comments
Choiseul black-faced pitta	Pitta anerythra nigrifrons	Choiseul, Solomon Islands	Only collected in lowland areas that have since been deforested.
Bougainville black-faced pitta	Pitta anerythra pallida	Bougainville Island, Autonomous Region of Bougainville	Last recorded in 1938.

==== Fantails and silktails (family Rhipiduridae) ====
Common name	Scientific name	Range	Comments	Pictures
Guam rufous fantail	Rhipidura rufifrons uraniae	Guam	Last recorded in either 1984 or 1985. Extinct primarily because of predation by introduced brown tree snakes, assisted by rats, monitor lizards, and possibly residual pesticides.	

==== Reed warblers (family Acrocephalidae) ====
Common name	Scientific name	Range	Comments	Pictures
Mangareva reed warbler	Acrocephalus astrolabii	unknown; possibly the Gambier Islands, French Polynesia	Known only from two individuals collected by Jules Dumont d'Urville between either 1826 and 1829 or 1838 and 1839. Likely disappeared due to deforestation and introduced predators.	
Nightingale reed warbler	Acrocephalus luscinius	Guam	Last recorded in 1969. It was driven to extinction by the introduced predatory brown tree snake. Habitat loss caused by fire and drainage of wetlands, pesticide use, and additional introduced predators like cats and rats were also contributing factors.	
Huahine warbler	Acrocephalus musae garretti	Huahine, Society Islands, French Polynesia	Only known from five individuals collected around 1869. It likely became extinct due to predation by introduced rats.	
Raiatea warbler	Acrocephalus musae musae	Raiatea, Society Islands, French Polynesia	Last collected between 1870 and 1873.	
Aguijan reed warbler	Acrocephalus nijoi	Aguijan, Mariana Islands	Last recorded in the mid-1990s. Extinct due to habitat loss caused by deforestation and grazing by introduced goats.	
Pagan reed warbler	Acrocephalus yamashinae	Pagan, Mariana Islands	Last recorded in the 1970s. It was made extinct by draining its wetland habitat for agriculture, grazing feral livestock destroying the understorey, which it used to breed, predation by introduced cats and rats, and general increase in land use by the military. If still alive in 1981, it might have been wiped out by a volcanic eruption that destroyed much of the remaining woody vegetation.	

==== Grassbirds and allies (family Locustellidae) ====
===== Possibly extinct =====
Common name	Scientific name	Range	Comments
Vanua Levu long-legged thicketbird	Cincloramphus rufus cluniei	Vanua Levu, Fiji	Only known from the type specimen collected in 1974. An unconfirmed sighting was made in 1990.

==== White-eyes (family Zosteropidae) ====
Common name	Scientific name	Range	Comments	Pictures
Guam bridled white-eye	Zosterops conspicillatus conspicillatus	Guam	Last recorded in 1983. Disappeared due to predation by the introduced brown tree snake.	

==== Starlings (family Sturnidae) ====
Common name	Scientific name	Range	Comments	Pictures
Kosrae starling	Aplonis corvina	Kosrae, Micronesia	Last collected in 1828. It disappeared due to predation by introduced rats.	
Huahine starling	Aplonis diluvialis	Huahine, Society Islands, French Polynesia	Most recent remains at Fa'ahia dated to 700-1150 CE.	
Mysterious starling	Aplonis mavornata	Mauke, Cook Islands	Only known from the type specimen collected in 1825. It disappeared due to predation by introduced rats.	
Raiatea starling	Aplonis ulietensis	Raiatea, Society Islands, French Polynesia	Known from a 1774 painting and descriptions. It is presumed to have been driven to extinction by introduced rats.	
Erromango starling	Aplonis sp.	Erromango, Vanuatu	Last dated in Ponamia after 950 BCE.	

===== Possibly extinct =====
Common name	Scientific name	Range	Comments	Pictures
Pohnpei starling	Aplonis pelzelni	Pohnpei, Micronesia	Last collected in 1995, with unconfirmed sightings in 2008. The reasons for its decline, which began in the 1930s, is unknown. Habitat loss, hunting, and predation by introduced rats have been suggested.	

==== Monarch flycatchers (family Monarchidae) ====
Common name	Scientific name	Range	Comments	Pictures
Guam flycatcher	Myiagra freycineti	Guam	Once common through the island, its population crashed rapidly after brown tree snakes were introduced, becoming restricted to the northern plateau in 1971, then to the Pajon Basin in early 1983. By the time a captive breeding program was set up in October of the same year, only one male could be found and captured. This animal died in captivity in May 1984 of unknown causes. Introduced diseases could also have contributed to its extinction.	
	Myiagra sp.	Ua Huka, Marquesas Islands, French Polynesia	Known from subfossil remains.	
Eiao monarch	Pomarea fluxa	Eiao, Marquesas Islands, French Polynesia	Last recorded in 1977. Disappeared soon after the chestnut-breasted mannikin was introduced to the island, implying that an exotic avian disease was transmitted to the population. The species may have also declined earlier due to habitat loss caused by sheep grazing, and predation by feral cats, black rats, and Polynesian rats.	
Nuku Hiva monarch	Pomarea nukuhivae	Nuku Hiva, Marquesas Islands, French Polynesia	Last recorded in the 1930s. Declined due to habitat loss caused by intense grazing and fire, and predation by introduced species including the black rat.	
Maupiti monarch	Pomarea pomarea	Maupiti, Society Islands, French Polynesia	Known only from the type specimen, collected in 1823. It was likely driven extinct by introduced species.	

===== Possibly extinct =====
Common name	Scientific name	Range	Comments
Ua Pou monarch	Pomarea mira	Ua Pou, Marquesas Islands, French Polynesia	Last confirmed record in 1985, with an unconfirmed sighting in 2010. It likely declined due to habitat loss and degradation through overgrazing and fires, along with predation by introduced mammals.

== Reptiles (class Reptilia) ==
=== Crocodilians (order Crocodilia) ===
==== Mekosuchines (clade Mekosuchinae) ====
Scientific name	Range	Comments	Pictures
Mekosuchus inexpectatus	Grande Terre and Isle of Pines, New Caledonia	Possibly survived until 140-280 CE, although this dating was not made directly on Mekosuchus bones.	
Mekosuchus kalpokasi	Efate, Vanuatu	Known from subfossil remains dated to around 1050 BCE.	
Volia athollandersoni	Fiji	Most recent remains at Naigani dated to 950 BCE.	

=== Squamates (order Squamata) ===
==== Australia-New Zealand geckos (family Diplodactylidae) ====
Common name	Scientific name	Range	Comments	Pictures
Delcourt's giant gecko	Gigarcanum delcourti	unknown; probably New Caledonia	Only known from an unlabelled, stuffed specimen discovered in the collections of the Natural History Museum of Marseille in 1986. The provenance and date of collection are unknown, but it is estimated to have been deposited in the 1830s on the style of preservation. The species was originally assigned to the New Zealand genus Hoplodactylus and speculated to be the inspiration of the kawekaweau of Maori folklore, but a genetic phylogeny in 2023 placed it among New Caledonian geckos instead.	

==== Skinks (family Scincidae) ====
Common name	Scientific name	Range	Comments
Tonga ground skink	Tachygia microlepis	Tonga	Only known specimens collected by Dumont d'Urville during the Astrolabe expedition, which returned to France in 1829.

==== Iguanas and chuckwallas (family Iguanidae) ====
Common name	Scientific name	Range	Comments	Pictures
Tongan giant iguana	Brachylophus gibbonsi	Tonga and Aiwa Levu, Fiji	Possibly introduced to Fiji by Tongan visitors. It was hunted to extinction, disappearing from Tonga around 900 BCE and from Fiji around 350 BCE.	
Fiji giant iguana	Lapitiguana impensa	Fiji	Most recent remains at Naigani dated to 950 BCE.	

==== Monitor lizards (family Varanidae) ====
Common name	Scientific name	Range	Comments
New Caledonian goanna	Varanus sp.	New Caledonia	Present before human settlement and presumed extinct for anthropogenic causes, though the evidence of interaction with humans is lacking.

=== Turtles and tortoises (order Testudines) ===
==== Horned turtles (family Meiolaniidae) ====
Scientific name	Range	Comments	Pictures
?Meiolania damelipi	Vanuatu and Viti Levu, Fiji	Hunted to extinction by about 810 BCE.	
Meiolania mackayi	New Caledonia	Extinct around 531 CE.	

== Amphibians (class Amphibia) ==
=== Toads and frogs (order Anura) ===
==== Wrinkled ground frogs (family Ceratobatrachidae) ====
Common name	Scientific name	Range	Comments
Giant Fiji ground frog	Platymantis megabotoniviti	Viti Levu, Fiji	Became extinct after humans arrived on Fiji with the commensal Polynesian rat and large New Guinea spiny rat during the first millennium BCE. Unlike other platymantine frogs that survived, it was a fully terrestrial species that didn't climb trees nor live near water. It probably also had relatively large eggs and juveniles, like its relatives, all of which would make this species more vulnerable to introduced predators.

== Insects (class Insecta) ==
=== Beetles (order Coleoptera) ===
==== Predaceous diving beetles (family Dytiscidae) ====
Scientific name	Range
Rhantus novacaledoniae	New Caledonia

=== Moths and butterflies (order Lepidoptera) ===
==== Smoky moths (family Zygaenidae) ====
Common name	Scientific name	Range	Comments	Pictures
Levuana moth	Levuana iridescens	Viti Levu, Fiji	Last recorded in 1956. The extinction followed the introduction of the parasitic fly Bessa remota by coconut farmers, as a form of biological pest control. However, it's been argued that L. iridescens was not actually native to Fiji and that lack of post-1956 records is the result of diminished enthomological research after Fiji's independence.	

=== Bark lice, book lice, and parasitic lice (order Psocodea) ===
==== Bird chewing lice (family Philopteridae) ====
===== Possibly extinct =====
Scientific name	Range	Comments
Rallicola guami	Guam	Parasite of the Guam rail, which is now extinct in the wild.
Rallicola piageti	New Caledonia	Parasite of the New Caledonian rail.

== Snails and slugs (class Gastropoda) ==
=== Order Stylommatophora ===
==== Family Bothriembryontidae ====
Scientific name	Range	Comments	Pictures
Leucocharis loyaltyensis	New Caledonia	Last recorded in the 1900s.	
Leucocharis porphyrocheila	New Caledonia	Last recorded in the 1900s.	

==== Family Charopidae ====
Scientific name	Range	Comments
Mautodontha acuticosta	French Polynesia	Last recorded in the 1880s.
Mautodontha consimilis	French Polynesia	Last recorded in the 1880s.
Mautodontha consobrina	French Polynesia	Last recorded in the 1880s.
Mautodontha maupiensis	French Polynesia	Last recorded in the 1880s.
Mautodontha parvidens	French Polynesia	Last recorded in the 1880s.
Mautodontha punctiperforata	French Polynesia	Last recorded in the 1880s.
Mautodontha saintjohni	French Polynesia	Last recorded in the 1880s.
Mautodontha subtilis	French Polynesia	Last recorded in the 1880s.
Mautodontha unilamellata	Cook Islands	Last recorded in the 1880s.
Mautodontha zebrina	Cook Islands	Last recorded in the 1880s.

==== Family Helicarionidae ====
Common name	Scientific name	Range
Mount Matafao different snail	Diastole matafaoi	American Samoa

==== Family Partulidae ====
Common name	Scientific name	Range	Comments	Pictures
Huahine tiny tree snail	Partula arguta	Huahine, Society Islands, French Polynesia	Exterminated by the introduced predatory snail Euglandina rosea. Individuals were captured for a breeding program, but it ended with the death of the last captive animal in 1994.	
Raiatean ground partula	Partula atilis	Raiatea, Society Islands, French Polynesia	Last recorded in 1992. Exterminated by E. rosea.	
Golden partula	Partula aurantia	Moorea, Society Islands, French Polynesia	Not recorded since E. rosea was introduced in 1977.	
Auriculate tree snail	Partula auriculata	Raiatea, Society Islands, French Polynesia	Last recorded in 1992. Exterminated by E. rosea.	
Tahaa banded tree snail	Partula bilineata	Taha'a, Society Islands, French Polynesia	Not recorded since E. rosea was introduced in the 1980s.	
Thick-lipped tree snail	Partula crassilabris	Raiatea, Society Islands, French Polynesia	Believed exterminated by E. rosea around 1991 and 1992.	
Raiatean banded tree snail	Partula cuneata	Raiatea, Society Islands, French Polynesia	Last recorded in 1936. Exterminated by E. rosea.	
Raiatean streaked tree snail	Partula dolichostoma	Raiatea, Society Islands, French Polynesia	Last recorded in the 1980s. Exterminated by E. rosea.	
Slender mountain tree snail	Partula dolorosa	Raiatea, Society Islands, French Polynesia	Last recorded in 1992. Exterminated by E. rosea.	
Captain Cook's bean snail	Partula faba	Raiatea and Taha'a, Society Islands, French Polynesia	Last recorded in the wild in 1992, after which it was exterminated by the introduced predator E. rosea. The last individual, from Raiatea, died at Edinburgh Zoo in 2016.	
Garrett's rustic tree snail	Partula garrettii rustica	Raiatea, Society Islands, French Polynesia	Last recorded before 1991. Exterminated by E. rosea.	
Thalia's tree snail	Partula garrettii thalia	Raiatea, Society Islands, French Polynesia	Last recorded in 1991. Exterminated by E. rosea.	
Tahaa hermit tree snail	Partula eremita	Taha'a, Society Islands, French Polynesia	Not recorded since E. rosea was introduced in the late 1980s.	
Burch's partula	Partula jackieburchi	Tahiti, Society Islands, French Polynesia	Not recorded after E. rosea was introduced in 1977.	
Vinuous tree snail	Partula labrusca	Raiatea, Society Islands, French Polynesia	Not recorded in the wild since 1992 due to predation by E. rosea. The last captive animal died in 2002.	
Thin-lipped tree snail	Partula leptochila	Raiatea, Society Islands, French Polynesia	Last recorded in 1992. Exterminated by E. rosea.	
Raiatean ground partula	Partula levistriata	Raiatea, Society Islands, French Polynesia	Last recorded in 1992. Exterminated by E. rosea.	
Bora Bora tree snail	Partula lutea	Bora Bora, Society Islands, French Polynesia	Not recorded since E. rosea was introduced in 1986.	
Tahaa large tree snail	Partula planilabrum	Tahaa, Society Islands, French Polynesia	Not recorded since E. rosea was introduced in the late 1980s.	
Tahitian banded tree snail	Partula producta	Faurahi Valley, Tahiti, French Polynesia	Not recorded since E. rosea was introduced in 1977.	
Raiatean banded partula	Partula protracta	Raiatea, Society Islands, French Polynesia	Thought to have disappeared around 1991-1992 because of predation by E. rosea, introduced in the late 1980s.	
Remote tree snail	Partula remota	Raiatea, Society Islands, French Polynesia	Thought to have disappeared around 1991-1992 because of predation by E. rosea, introduced in the late 1980s.	
Mount Alifana partula	Partula salifana	Guam	Last recorded alive in 1946; shells found in 1989 may indicate survival until the early 1980s. It was exterminated by introduced predators like E. rosea and the New Guinea flatworm Platydemus manokwari.	
Arrow-head tree snail	Partula sagitta	Tahaa, Society Islands, French Polynesia	Not recorded since E. rosea was introduced in the late 1980s.	
Swollen Raiatea tree snail	Partula turgida	Raiatea, Society Islands, French Polynesia	Last recorded in the wild in 1992, due to predation by E. rosea. The last individual in captivity died in 1996.	
Tahaa squat tree snail	Partula umbilicata	Tahaa, Society Islands, French Polynesia	Not recorded since E. rosea was introduced in the late 1980s.	

===== Possibly extinct =====
Common name	Scientific name	Range	Comments	Pictures
Aphrodite's tree snail	Partula cytherea	Papenoo valley, Tahiti, French Polynesia	Last recorded in 2005. Declined due to predation by introduced rosy wolfsnails	
Pohnpei ground partula snail	Partula guamensis	Pohnpei, Micronesia	Last recorded in 1936. Declined due to predation by introduced species like the flatworm Platydemus manokwari, brown rat, black rat, Polynesian rat, and snail E. rosea.	

===== Extinct in the wild =====
Common name	Scientific name	Range	Comments	Pictures
Toothed partula	Partula dentifera	Raiatea, Society Islands, French Polynesia	Last recorded in the wild in 1992 as a result of predation by E. rosea.	
Rose-tipped partula snail	Partula hebe	Raiatea, Society Islands, French Polynesia	Last recorded in the wild in 1992 because of predation by E. rosea.	
Miracle tree snail	Partula mirabilis	Moorea, Society Islands, French Polynesia	Not recorded in the wild since E. rosea was introduced in 1977.	
Moorean smooth tree snail	Partula mooreana	Moorea, Society Islands, French Polynesia	Not recorded in the wild since E. rosea was introduced in 1977. A reintroduction program began in 2016.	
Raiatean ground partula snail	Partula navigatoria	Raiatea, Society Islands, French Polynesia	The last known wild individuals were taken for a captive breeding program in 1992. The species was reintroduced in 2016.	
Tahitian nodular partula	Partula nodosa	Tahiti, Society Islands, French Polynesia	Not recorded in the wild since E. rosea was introduced in 1977.	
Pink partula	Partula rosea	Huahine, Society Islands, French Polynesia	Not recorded in the wild since E. rosea was introduced in the early 1990s.	
Sutural partula	Partula suturalis	Moorea, Society Islands, French Polynesia	Not recorded in the wild since E. rosea was introduced in 1977.	
Mount Tohiea tree snail	Partula tohiveana	Fareahito valley, Moorea, French Polynesia	Not recorded in the wild since E. rosea was introduced in 1977.	
Mourning partula	Partula tristis	Raiatea, French Polynesia	Last recorded in the wild in 1992 as a result of predation by E. rosea.	
Variable tree snail	Partula varia	Huahine, Society Islands, French Polynesia	Not recorded in the wild since E. rosea was introduced in the early 1990s. A reintroduction attempt began in 2018.	

== Plants (kingdom Plantae) ==
=== Order Arecales ===
==== Palm trees (family Arecaceae) ====
Common name	Scientific name	Range	Comments	Pictures
Easter Island palm	Paschalococos disperta	Easter Island, Chile	Disappeared between 1250 and 1650 CE, possibly as a result of clearing areas for agriculture and predation of nuts by introduced rats.	Easter Island palm symbols in rongorongo script

=== Order Asterales ===
==== Sunflowers (family Asteraceae) ====
Scientific name	Range
Fitchia mangarevensis	Taravai, Gambier Islands, French Polynesia

=== Order Fabales ===
==== Legumes (family Fabaceae) ====
===== Possibly extinct =====
Scientific name	Range	Comments
Callerya neocaledonica	Nakutakoin, Dumbea, New Caledonia	Only known from the holotype collected in 1992, in a forest degraded by uncontrolled fires and introduced cattle, pigs, and rusa deer.
Canavalia veillonii	Bourail, New Caledonia	Only known from the holotype collected in 1990. Threatened by deforestation caused by uncontrolled fires, clearing for agriculture, and predation by introduced rusa deer.

===== Extinct in the wild =====
Common name	Scientific name	Range	Comments	Pictures
Toromiro	Sophora toromiro	Easter Island, Chile	Last wild tree was cut down in 1960. Survives in captivity in Chile and other countries, but all attempts at reintroduction have been unsuccessful.	

=== Order Gentianales ===
==== Dogbanes (family Apocynaceae) ====
===== Extinct in the wild =====
Scientific name	Range	Comments	Pictures
Ochrosia brownii	Nuku Hiva, Marquesas Islands	Last individuals in the wild died after 2003. Declined due to deforestation, predation by introduced animals and competition with introduced plants.	

=== Order Lauraceae ===
==== Hernandias and relatives (family Hernandiaceae) ====
===== Possibly extinct =====
Scientific name	Range	Comments
Hernandia drakeana	Moorea, Society Islands, French Polynesia	Last collected in 1981.

=== Order Lamiales ===
==== Figworts (family Scrophulariaceae) ====
Scientific name	Range	Comments
Myoporum rimatarense	Rimatara, Austral Islands, French Polynesia	Only known from the holotype collected in 1921. Presumably lost due to overxploitation of coastal forests for timber.

=== Order Malvales ===
==== Mallows (family Malvaceae) ====
===== Extinct in the wild =====
Common name	Scientific name	Range	Comments	Pictures
Yellow fatu	Abutilon pitcairnense	Pitcairn Island	Last wild plants killed by a landslide in 2005. Declined due to heavy soil erosion and competition with introduced Syzygium jambos and Lantana camara.	

=== Order Malpighiales ===
==== Euphorbias (family Euphorbiaceae) ====
Scientific name	Range	Comments
Acalypha wilderi	Northern and western Rarotonga, Cook Islands	Last recorded in 1929. Likely a naturally uncommon species found in semi-dry valleys only, it was likely extirpated as a result of deforestation for agriculture, construction, and plantation forestry, as well as habitat degradation caused by introduced feral plants.

=== Order Myrtales ===
==== Myrtles (family Myrtaceae) ====
Scientific name	Range	Comments
Xanthostemon sebertii	Prony Bay, New Caledonia	Last collected in 1869.

=== Order Oxalidales ===
==== Coachwood and allies (family Cunoniaceae) ====
Scientific name	Range	Comments
Weinmannia spiraeoides	Ovalau, Fiji	Known only from the holotype collected in 1840.

=== Order Proteales ===
==== Proteas (family Proteaceae) ====
Scientific name	Range
Stenocarpus dumbeensis	Nouméa, New Caledonia

=== Order Sapindales ===
==== Soapberries (family Sapindaceae) ====
Scientific name	Range	Comments
Cupaniopsis crassivalvis	Northeast of La Conception, Nouméa, New Caledonia	Last collected in 1869.

== See also ==
- Lists of extinct species
- List of Australia-New Guinea species extinct in the Holocene
- List of Hawaiian animals extinct in the Holocene
- List of New Zealand species extinct in the Holocene
- List of extinct bird species since 1500
- Extinct in the wild
- Lazarus taxon
- United States Fish and Wildlife Service
- IUCN Red List
