= Timeline of extinctions in the 19th century =

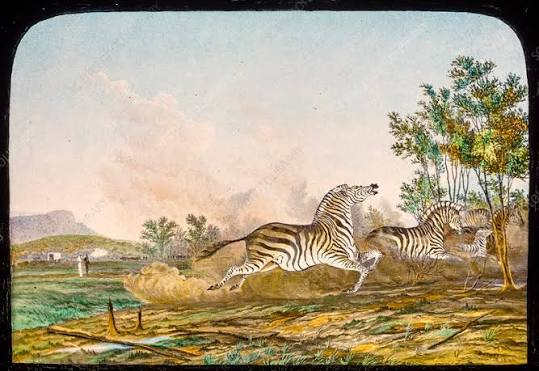
Illustration of settlers hunting quaggas in South Africa. By Thomas Baines, c. 1857-1864.

This timeline of extinctions is a chronological list of biological species, subspecies, and other evolutionary significant units recorded to have disappeared during the course of the 19th century of the second millennium.

Following the parent timeline of extinctions in the Holocene, the entries included range from 1800 to 1899, even though the 19th century is properly established to have lasted from January 1, 1801, to December 31, 1900. For extinctions in 1900, see timeline of extinctions in the 20th century.

The list is incomplete by necessity, since the majority of extinctions are thought to be undocumented, and for many others there isn't a definitive, widely accepted last, or most recent record. According to the species-area theory, the present rate of extinction may be up to 140,000 species per year.

== Timeline ==
=== 1800s ===
Last record	Common name	Binomial name	Former range	Declared extinct	Causes	Picture
1800	Domed Rodrigues giant tortoise	Cylindraspis peltastes	Rodrigues	1994 (IUCN)	Possibly hunting and introduced predators and competitors.	
1800	Saddle-backed Rodrigues giant tortoise	Cylindraspis vosmaeri	Rodrigues	1994 (IUCN)	Possibly hunting and introduced predators and competitors.	
1801	Bory's white bat	Boryptera alba	Réunion		Probably deforestation and predation by introduced rats.	
1802	Smooth handfish	Sympterichthys unipennis	Southeastern Tasmania?	2020 (IUCN)	Fishing?	
1803	Hoffstetter's worm snake	Madatyphlops cariei	Mauritius	1994 (IUCN)	Probably introduced predators.	
1806	Wynberg conebush	Leucadendron grandiflorum	Cape Peninsula, South Africa	2020 (IUCN)	Probably habitat destruction.	
1807	St. Paul Island duck	Mareca sp.	Île Saint-Paul, French Southern and Antarctic Lands		Hunting.	

=== 1810s ===
Last record	Common name	Binomial name	Former range	Declared extinct	Causes	Picture
1810	Campbell Island parakeet	Cyanoramphus sp.	Campbell Island, New Zealand	1840	Predation by introduced brown rats.	
1810	Saint Helena heliotrope	Heliotropium pannifolium	Coastal lowlands of Saint Helena	2016 (IUCN)	Predation by introduced goats.	
1819 (Note: One egg was found in 1830, but it could have been from an Australian emu introduced in 1826, or a hybrid (Hume, 2017).)	Kangaroo Island emu	Dromaius novaehollandiae baudinianus	Kangaroo Island, Australia	1837; 1988 (IUCN)	Hunting.	

=== 1820s ===
Last record	Common name	Binomial name	Former range	Declared extinct	Causes	Picture
1820	Manchester moth	Euclemensia woodiella	Kersal Moor, England		Undetermined.	
1820–1829		Amynthas japonicus	Possibly Dejima or Nagasaki, Japan		Possibly habitat loss.	
1821–1822	Providence blue pigeon	Alectroenas sp.	Islands St. Pierre and Providence, Seychelles		Undetermined.	
1822	Manila Bay herring	Clupea manulensis	Manila Bay, Philippines		Overfishing, habitat destruction, and pollution.	
1822	King Island emu (Note: In captivity. Last recorded in the wild in 1805 (Hume, 2017).)	Dromaius novaehollandiae minor	King Island, Australia	1988 (IUCN)	Hunting.	
1823	Vava'u pigeon	Columba vitiensis ssp.	Vava'u Islands, Tonga		Undetermined.	
1823	Madeira finch	Goniaphea leucocephala	Madeira, Portugal		Undetermined.	
1823	Spotted green pigeon	Caloenas maculata	Tahiti, French Polynesia? (Note: Type specimen of unknown provenance. Birds of similar color were described by Tahiti natives in 1928, but were not observed by scientists (IUCN).)	2008 (IUCN)	Hunting?	
1823	Maupiti monarch	Pomarea pomarea	Maupiti, Society Islands, French Polynesia	1988 (IUCN)	Probably introduced species.	
1824	Newfoundland duck	Anas fuscescens	Newfoundland, Canada		Undetermined.	
1825	Mysterious starling	Aplonis mavornata	Mauke, Cook Islands	1988 (IUCN)	Predation by introduced brown rats.	
1825	Mauke fruit dove	Ptilinopus rarotongensis byronensis	Mauke, Cook Islands		Undetermined.	
1825	ʻĀmaui	Myadestes woahensis	Oahu, Hawaii, United States	1988 (IUCN)	Possibly habitat destruction and introduced avian malaria.	
1826 (Note: Unconfirmed sighting from 1837.)	Mauritius blue pigeon	Alectroenas nitidissimus	Mauritius	1988 (IUCN)	Deforestation.	
1826–1839	Mangareva reed warbler	Acrocephalus astrolabii	Possibly the Gambier Islands, French Polynesia		Likely deforestation and introduced predators.	
1827–1828	Kosrae crake	Zapornia monasa	Kosrae, Micronesia	1880; 1988 (IUCN)	Predation by introduced rats.	
1828	Kosrae starling	Aplonis corvina	Kosrae, Micronesia	1880; 1988 (IUCN)	Probably predation by introduced rats.	
1828	Bonin grosbeak	Carpodacus ferreorostris	Bonin Islands, Japan	1854; 1988 (IUCN)	Possibly deforestation and predation by introduced cats and rats.	
1828	Bonin thrush	Zoothera terrestris	Bonin Islands, Japan	1889; 1988 (IUCN)	Probably predation by introduced cats and rats.	
c. 1829 (Note: The only known specimens were collected by Jules Dumont d'Urville during the Astrolabe expedition, which returned to France in that year.)	Tonga ground skink	Tachygyia microlepis	Tonga	1996 (IUCN)	Habitat loss and predation by introduced dogs, pigs, and rats.	

=== 1830s ===
Last record	Common name	Binomial name	Former range	Declared extinct	Causes	Picture
1830	Kotzebue's lorikeet	Charmosyna samoensis	Samoa		Undetermined.	
1830–1839	Delcourt's giant gecko	Gigarcanum delcourti	New Caledonia?		Undetermined.	
1830–1839	Phillip Island glory pea	Streblorrhiza speciosa	Phillip Island, Australia	1978 (IUCN)	Predation by introduced feral pigs, goats and rabbits.	
1831		Deyeuxia lawrencei	Possibly near Launceston, Tasmania, Australia		Undetermined.	
1834	Delalande's coua	Coua delalandei	Nosy Boraha, Madagascar	1994 (IUCN)	Deforestation.	
1834	Mascarene parrot (Note: In captivity. Last seen in the wild in 1775 (IUCN).)	Mascarinus mascarin	Réunion	1804 (wild); 1988 (IUCN)	Hunting.	
1834	Atlas bear (Note: Two haplotypes are found in remains from the Vandal and Byzantine periods: one shared with Iberian bears that could have been introduced by humans, and another unique to Africa. It is not known which type survived until more recent times, because the 1834 holotype is lost.)	Ursus arctos crowtheri	Northern Maghreb		Possibly habitat fragmentation.	
1835	Darwin's large ground finch	Geospiza magnirostris magnirostris	Floreana and San Cristóbal, Galápagos Islands	1838	Habitat destruction and introduced predators.	
1837	Oʻahu ʻakialoa	Akialoa ellisiana (Note: Unconfirmed sightings in 1937 and 1940 (IUCN).)	Oahu, Hawaii, United States	2016 (IUCN)	Possibly habitat destruction and introduced disease.	
1837	Hoopoe starling	Fregilupus varius	Réunion	1988 (IUCN)	Possibly introduced disease, hunting, and habitat degradation.	
1837	Oʻahu ʻōʻō	Moho apicalis	Oahu, Hawaii, United States	1890; 1988 (IUCN)	Habitat loss and introduction of disease-carrying mosquitos.	
1837	Mauritius owl	Otus sauzieri	Mauritius	1859; 1988 (IUCN)	Possibly deforestation, hunting, and predation by introduced mammals.	
1837	Martinique curlytail lizard	Leiocephalus herminieri	Martinique	2017 (IUCN)	Undetermined.	
1838–1841 (Note: Unconfirmed reports by natives until 1860.)	Oʻahu nukupuʻu	Hemignathus lucidus	Oahu, Hawaii, United States	1890	Undetermined.	
1839	Réunion slit-eared skink	Gongylomorphus borbonicus	Réunion		Probably predation by introduced snakes.	
1839		Trianthema cypseleoides	Hawkesbury River, New South Wales, Australia		Undetermined.	
1839–1841	Large Samoan flying fox	Pteropus coxi	Samoan Islands	2020 (IUCN)	Undetermined.	

=== 1840s ===
Last record	Common name	Binomial name	Former range	Declared extinct	Causes	Picture
c. 1840	Réunion giant tortoise	Cylindraspis indica	Réunion	1994 (IUCN)	Undetermined.	
1840	Dieffenbach's Rail	Hypotaenidia dieffenbachii	Chatham Islands, New Zealand	1872; 1988 (IUCN)	Possibly introduced predators and habitat loss from fire.	
1840		Littoraria flammea	Chinese coast	1996 (IUCN)	Habitat loss.	
1840		Weinmannia spiraeoides	Ovalau, Fiji	1998 (IUCN)	Undetermined.	
1842	Rodrigues giant day gecko	Phelsuma gigas	Rodrigues	1874	Possibly introduced Norway rats.	
1843	Big-eared hopping mouse	Notomys macrotis	West-central Western Australia, Australia	2016 (IUCN)	Predation by cats and habitat degradation.	
1844	Black-fronted parakeet	Cyanorhamphus zealandicus	Tahiti, Society Islands, French Polynesia	1988 (IUCN)	Possibly deforestation, hunting, and predation by introduced species.	
1846	Darling Downs hopping mouse	Notomys mordax	Darling Downs, Queensland, Australia	1982 (IUCN)	Possibly predation by introduced cats, and habitat destruction by agriculture and livestock farming.	
1846	Liverpool Plains striped bandicoot	Perameles fasciata	North-central New South Wales, Australia	2022 (IUCN)	Undetermined.	
1847		Logania depressa	East of Waiouru and north of Moawhango, New Zealand		Habitat degradation.	
1849	Clubmoss everlasting	Ozothamnus selaginoides	Mount Wellington, Tasmania, Australia		Undetermined.	

=== 1850s ===
Last record	Common name	Binomial name	Former range	Declared extinct	Causes	Picture
c. 1850	Daudin's giant tortoise	Aldabrachelys gigantea daudinii	Mahé, Seychelles		Undetermined.	
c. 1850	Floreana giant tortoise	Chelonoidis niger	Floreana, Galápagos Islands, Ecuador	1996 (IUCN)	Probably hunting and introduced species. (Note: Hybrid descendants of C. niger and C. becki survive in nearby Isabela Island.)	
c. 1850	Southern black rhinoceros	Diceros bicornis bicornis	Southwestern Africa		Undetermined.	
1850	Javan elephant (Note: In Sulu, where it was introduced in the 14th century. Most recent remains in Java dated to 1350.)	Elephas maximus sondaicus	Java, Indonesia; introduced to Sulu, Philippines		Undetermined. (Note: It was proposed that the extant Bornean elephant (E. m. borneensis) is synonymous with E. m. sondaicus. If true, this would mean the Javan elephant is not globally extinct.)	
1850	Turquoise-throated puffleg	Eriocnemis godini	Northern Ecuador		Habitat destruction.	
1850	Spectacled cormorant	Urile perspicillatus	Commander Islands, Russia; Northeast Japan (Pleistocene)	1882; 1988 (IUCN)	Hunting.	
1850-1900	Imber's petrel	Pterodroma imberi	Chatham Islands, New Zealand		Hunting and predation by introduced cats.	
1851	Tasmanian emu	Dromaius novaehollandiae diemenensis	Tasmania, Australia		Hunting.	
1851	Norfolk kākā (Note: In captivity.)	Nestor productus	Norfolk Island, Australia	1988 (IUCN)	Hunting and habitat destruction by introduced rabbits, pigs, and goats.	
1851		Diospyros angulata	Mauritius	2025 (IUCN)	Invasive species, and habitat destruction.	
1851	Jamaican giant galliwasp	Celestus occiduus	Jamaica		Extermination by introduced predators such as mongooses.	
Before 1852	Letitia's thorntail	Discosura letitiae	Bolivia		Undetermined.	
1852		Canaridiscus engonatus	Tenerife, Canary Islands, Spain		Possibly urbanization.	
1852		Canaridiscus retextus	La Palma, Canary Islands, Spain		Possibly deforestation.	
1852	Great auk	Pinguinus impennis	North Atlantic and western Mediterranean	1988 (IUCN)	Hunting.	
1853	Lord Howe pigeon	Columba vitiensis godmanae	Lord Howe Island, Australia		Hunting.	
1855		Schiedea amplexicaulis	Kauai and possibly Niihau, Hawaii, United States	2016 (IUCN)	Likely introduced plants and animals.	
1855–1875 (Note: In captivity (IUCN).)	Stringwood	Acalypha rubrinervis	Central ridge of St Helena island	1998 (IUCN)	Undetermined.	
Before 1856	Whitenose bubble-nest frog	Pseudophilautus leucorhinus	Sri Lanka	2004 (IUCN)	Possibly habitat loss.	
1856	Sandhills crayfish	Procambarus angustatus	Sand Hills, Georgia, United States	2006 (IUCN)	Undetermined.	
1856	Small Samoan flying fox	Pteropus allenorum	Upolu, Samoa	2020 (IUCN)	Undetermined.	
1857	Southern barred bandicoot	Perameles notina	Southern Australia	2025 (IUCN)	Pastoral development, habitat alteration, and predation by introduced cats.	
1858	Variable bush frog	Pseudophilautus variabilis	Sri Lanka	2004 (IUCN)	Possibly habitat loss due to agriculture.	
1859	Kioea	Chaetoptila angustipluma	Hawaiʻi, Oahu, and Maui, Hawaii, United States	1988 (IUCN)	Possibly deforestation, hunting, and introduced predators.	
1859		Pseudophilautus pardus	Sri Lanka	2004 (IUCN)	Possibly habitat loss due to agriculture.	

=== 1860s ===
Last record	Common name	Binomial name	Former range	Declared extinct	Causes	Picture
c. 1860	Sea mink (Note: Reports from 1894 are likely of American mink expanding into the sea mink's former range (IUCN).)	Neovison macrodon	Atlantic coast of Canada and New England	2002 (IUCN)	Hunting for the fur trade.	
1860-1869	Insular myotis	Myotis insularum	Samoa		Undetermined.	
1860		Geomitra delphinuloides	Eastern Madeira, Portugal		Undetermined.	
1860		Pseudoyersinia brevipennis	Hyères, France	2020 (IUCN)	Undetermined.	
1860	Gould's emerald	Riccordia elegans	Jamaica?	1988 (IUCN)	Undetermined.	
1860	Jamaican poorwill	Siphonorhis americana	Jamaica		Predation by introduced black rats, brown rats, and small Indian mongooses.	
1860-1862	White-footed rabbit rat	Conilurus albipes	South-eastern Australia	2016 (IUCN)	Possibly disease spread by introduced rodents.	
1861	Ebon Island fruit dove	Ptilinopus porphyraceus marshallianus	Ebon, Marshall Islands		Undetermined.	
1861	Schmarda's worm	Tokea orthostichon	Maungarei, New Zealand		Undetermined.	
1862	Small Mauritian flying fox (Note: In Réunion. Last seen in Mauritius in 1859 (IUCN).)	Pteropus subniger	Mauritius and Réunion	1988 (IUCN)	Hunting and deforestation.	
1863	Mbashe River buff	Deloneura immaculata	Eastern Cape Province, South Africa	1994 (IUCN)	Undetermined.	
1864	British large copper	Lycaena dispar dispar	England		Undetermined.	
1864		Pseudophilautus temporalis	Sri Lanka	2004 (IUCN)	Possibly habitat loss due to agriculture.	
1864	Hawaiian rail	Zapornia sandwichensis	Eastern Hawaiʻi (and Molokai?), United States	1988 (IUCN)	Possibly hunting, deforestation, predation by introduced black rats, pigs, cats, and dogs, and introduced diseases from poultry.	
1865	Sharpe's rail	Gallirallus sharpei	unknown; possibly Java, Sumatra, or Borneo		Undetermined.	
1865		Janulus pompylius	La Palma, Canary Islands, Spain		Undetermined.	
1865	Mauritius snout butterfly	Libythea cinyras	Mauritius	1986 (IUCN)	Undetermined.	
1865	Cape lion	Panthera leo melanochaita	Cape Province, South Africa		Extermination campaign. (Note: Genetics do not support subspecific differentiation between the Cape lion and living lions in Eastern Africa; if placed in a single subspecies, it would be P. l. melanochaita because of being the older name.)	
1866	Siau scops owl (Note: Only known from the holotype, though a scops owl of unknown species was filmed in Siau in 2017.)	Otus manadensis siaoensis	Siau Island, Indonesia		Deforestation.	
1867	Eastern elk	Cervus canadensis canadensis	Eastern North America	1880	Hunting. (Note: It's been argued (based on genetic data) that most or all elk subspecies in North America are actually the same, which would be C. c. canadensis due to being named first.)	
1867		Gonidomus newtoni	Mauritius	1994 (IUCN)	Undetermined.	
1868	Kawaihae hibiscadelphus	Hibiscadelphus bombycinus	Kawaihae, Hawaii, United States	1998 (IUCN)	Undetermined.	
1869	Huahine warbler	Acrocephalus musae garretti	Huahine, Society Islands, French Polynesia	1921	Possibly predation by introduced rats.	
1869		Cupaniopsis crassivalvis	Northeast of La Conception, Nouméa, New Caledonia	1998 (IUCN)	Undetermined.	
1869	Lord Howe parakeet	Cyanoramphus subflavescens	Lord Howe Island, Australia	1999	Persecution by crop farmers.	
1869		Pachystyla rufozonata	Mauritius	1994 (IUCN)	Undetermined.	
1869		Pseudophilautus nanus	Southern Sri Lanka	2004 (IUCN)	Habitat loss.	
1869	Sharp-nosed bush frog	Pseudophilautus nasutus	Sri Lanka	2004 (IUCN)	Habitat loss.	
1869		Xanthostemon sebertii	Prony Bay, New Caledonia	1998 (IUCN)	Undetermined.	

=== 1870s ===
Last record	Common name	Binomial name	Former range	Declared extinct	Causes	Picture
1870		Belgrandia varica	Var River Delta, France		Urbanization and pollution.	
1870	North Island snipe	Coenocorypha barrierensis	North Island, New Zealand	2014 (IUCN)	Predation by introduced Polynesian rats and feral cats.	
1870		Cyanea mauiensis	Maui, Hawaii, United States	2016 (IUCN)	Probably habitat degradation caused by invasive plants and animals.	
1870		Delissea niihauensis	Niihau, Hawaii, United States	1998 (IUCN)	Competition with introduced plants and habitat degradation caused by invasive plants and animals.	
1870	Hillebrand's phyllostegia	Phyllostegia hillebrandii	Mount Haleakala, Maui, Hawaii, United States		Likely deforestation and predation by introduced pigs, cattle, deer, goats, and competition with introduced plants.	
1870-1873	Raiatea warbler	Acrocephalus musae musae	Raiatea, Society Islands, French Polynesia		Undetermined.	
1870–1879
1870–1879		Campolaemus perexilis	Saint Helena	1994 (IUCN)	Undetermined.	
1870–1879		Chilonopsis blofeldi	Saint Helena	1994 (IUCN)	Undetermined.	
1870–1879		Chilonopsis exulatus	Saint Helena	1994 (IUCN)	Undetermined.	
1870–1879		Chilonopsis helena	Saint Helena	1994 (IUCN)	Undetermined.	
1870–1879		Chilonopsis subplicatus	Saint Helena	1994 (IUCN)	Undetermined.	
1870–1879		Chilonopsis subtruncatus	Saint Helena	1994 (IUCN)	Undetermined.	
1870–1879		Helenoconcha leptalea	Saint Helena	1994 (IUCN)	Undetermined.	
1870–1879		Helenoconcha minutissima	Saint Helena	1994 (IUCN)	Undetermined.	
1870–1879		Helenoconcha polyodon	Saint Helena	1994 (IUCN)	Undetermined.	
1870–1879		Helenoconcha pseustes	Saint Helena	1994 (IUCN)	Undetermined.	
1870–1879		Helenoconcha sexdentata	Saint Helena	1994 (IUCN)	Undetermined.	
1870–1879		Helenodiscus bilamellata	Saint Helena	1994 (IUCN)	Undetermined.	
1870–1879		Helenodiscus vernoni	Saint Helena	1994 (IUCN)	Undetermined.	
1870–1879	Morant's blue	Lepidochrysops hypopolia	South Africa	2020 (IUCN)	Undetermined.	
1870–1879		Pupilla obliquicosta	Saint Helena	1994 (IUCN)	Undetermined.	
1871	Spined dwarf mantis	Ameles fasciipennis	Tolentino, Italy	2020 (IUCN)	Possibly habitat loss to agriculture.	
1871		Clermontia multiflora	West Maui and the Koolau Mountains of Oahu, Hawaii, United States	2003 (IUCN)	Undetermined.	
1871		Ctenoglypta newtoni	Mauritius	1994 (IUCN)	Undetermined.	
1871	Cape warthog	Phacochoerus aethiopicus aethiopicus	Cape Province, South Africa		Undetermined.	
1872		Pseudophilautus oxyrhynchus	Sri Lanka	2004 (IUCN)	Possibly habitat loss.	
1873	Tristan moorhen	Gallinula nesiotis	Tristan da Cunha	1988 (IUCN)	Hunting, predation by introduced cats, rats, and pigs; and habitat destruction by fire.	
1873	Samoan woodhen (Note: Two unconfirmed sightings in 2003 (IUCN).)	Pareudiastes pacificus	Savai'i, Samoa		Hunting and predation by introduced cats, rats, pigs, and dogs.	
Before 1874	Large Palau flying fox	Pteropus pilosus	Palau	1988 (IUCN)	Possibly hunting and habitat degradation.	
1874		Cyanea comata	Southern slope of Haleakala, Maui, Hawaii, United States	2003 (IUCN)	Likely deforestation.	
1874		Luciobarbus nasus	Ksob river drainage, Morocco	2022 (IUCN)	Undetermined.	
1874	Coues's gadwall	Mareca strepera couesi	Teraina, Line Islands, Kiribati	1924	Probably hunting and introduced predators.	
1874		Parmacella gervaisii	La Crau, Provence, France		Undetermined. The species has been suggested to be the same as, or related to Drusia deshayesii from northern Morocco and Algeria, as well as an introduced species.	
1874	Percy Island flying fox	Pteropus brunneus	Percy Islands, Australia	1996 (IUCN)	Possibly habitat loss.	
1874		Vernonia sechellensis	Mahé, Seychelles	1998 (IUCN)	Deforestation.	
Before 1875	Great Saint Helena awl snail	Chilonopsis nonpareil	Saint Helena	1994 (IUCN)	Habitat modification caused by introduced pigs, goats, and rabbits; and predation by introduced rats, mice, and the centipede Scolopendra morsitans.	
1875	Newton's parakeet	Alexandrinus exsul	Rodrigues	1988 (IUCN)	Probably habitat loss and hunting. The last pairs may have been killed by the 1876 cyclone season.	
1875	North Island little spotted kiwi	Apteryx owenii iredalei	North Island, New Zealand		Hunting, habitat degradation, and predation by introduced mammals.	
1875	Labrador duck (Note: Unconfirmed kill in 1878.)	Camptorhynchus labradorius	Atlantic coast of Canada and New England	1988 (IUCN)	Hunting, egg harvesting, and habitat loss.	
1875	New Zealand quail	Coturnix novaezelandiae	New Zealand	1988 (IUCN)	Introduced diseases?	
1875	Daintree's river banana	Musa fitzalanii	Daintree River, northeast Queensland, Australia		Undetermined.	
1875	Broad-faced potoroo	Potorous platyops	Western Australia, Australia	1982 (IUCN)	Predation by feral cats and habitat loss.	
1876 or earlier		Pseudophilautus maia	Ramboda, Sri Lanka	2008 (IUCN)	Possibly deforestation.	
1876	Falkland Islands wolf	Dusicyon australis	Falkland Islands	1986 (IUCN)	Extermination campaign.	
1876	Kermadec megapode	Megapodius sp.	Raoul, Kermadec Islands, New Zealand		Volcanic eruption.	
1876	Himalayan quail (Note: Unconfirmed sighting in 2010 (IUCN).)	Ophrysia superciliosa	Possibly Uttarakhand, India and western Nepal		Hunting and habitat loss.	
1877	Brace's emerald	Riccordia bracei	New Providence, Bahamas	1988 (IUCN)	Undetermined.	
1877		Sterculia khasiana	Khasi Hills, Meghalaya, India	1998 (IUCN)	Likely habitat loss caused by extensive agriculture and fires.	
1877	Jamaican rice rat	Oryzomys antillarum	Jamaica	2008 (IUCN)	Competition with introduced rats, or predation by introduced mongooses.	
Before 1878		Leiostyla gibba	Madeira, Portugal		Undetermined, after human settlement.	
1878	Navassa Island iguana	Cyclura cornuta onchiopsis	Navassa Island	2011 (IUCN)	Probably hunting.	
1878		Discula tetrica	Desertas Islands of Madeira, Portugal		Undetermined.	
1878	Antioquia brown-banded antpitta	Grallaria milleri gilesi	Santa Elena, Antioquia, Colombia		Probably deforestation.	
1878		Keraea garachicoensis	North Tenerife, Canary Islands, Spain		Undetermined.	
1878		Leiostyla abbreviata	Madeira, Portugal		Undetermined.	
1878	Madeiran land snail	Leiostyla lamellosa	Madeira, Portugal	1996 (IUCN)	Undetermined.	
1878		Pseudocampylaea lowii	Madeira, Portugal		Undetermined.	
1879	Macquarie Island banded rail	Hypotaenidia philippensis macquariensis	South Macquarie Island, Australia	1894	Predation by introduced cats, rats, weka, and overgrazing by introduced rabbits.	
1879	Moseley's parrot	Psittrichas sp.	Admiralty Islands, Papua New Guinea		Undetermined.	
1879	Jamaican petrel (Note: Unconfirmed sighting in 1936 (Hume, 2017).)	Pterodroma caribbaea	Jamaica; Dominica and Guadeloupe?		Hunting and predation by introduced rats, mongooses, pigs, and dogs.	

=== 1880s ===
Last record	Common name	Binomial name	Former range	Declared extinct	Causes	Picture
1880	Lesser yellow bat	Scotophilus borbonicus	Southern Madagascar and Réunion		Undetermined.	
1880–1889?	Parras characodon	Characodon garmani	Southern Coahuila, Mexico	1953; 1988 (IUCN)	Probably habitat loss.	
1880–1889		Mautodontha acuticosta	French Polynesia		Undetermined.	
1880–1889		Mautodontha consimilis	French Polynesia		Undetermined.	
1880–1889		Mautodontha consobrina	French Polynesia		Undetermined.	
1880–1889		Mautodontha maupiensis	French Polynesia		Undetermined.	
1880–1889		Mautodontha parvidens	French Polynesia		Undetermined.	
1880–1889		Mautodontha punctiperforata	French Polynesia		Undetermined.	
1880–1889		Mautodontha saintjohni	French Polynesia		Undetermined.	
1880–1889		Mautodontha subtilis	French Polynesia		Undetermined.	
1880–1889		Mautodontha unilamellata	Cook Islands		Undetermined.	
1880–1889		Mautodontha zebrina	Cook Islands		Undetermined.	
c. 1881	Saint Lucia giant rice rat	Megalomys luciae	Saint Lucia	1994 (IUCN)	Predation by introduced mongooses.	
1881	Jamaican wood rail	Amaurolimnas concolor concolor	Jamaica		Possibly predation by introduced mongooses, cats, and rats.	
1882	Gunther's streamlined frog	Nannophrys guentheri	Sri Lanka	2004 (IUCN)	Undetermined.	
1882		Pseudophilautus extirpo	Sri Lanka	2004 (IUCN)	Possibly habitat loss.	
1883	Quagga (Note: In captivity. Last seen in the wild between 1860 and 1865 (Bryden, 1889).)	Equus quagga quagga	Cape Province, South Africa	1889; 1986 (IUCN)	Hunting.	
1884-1886		Chilonopsis turtoni	Saint Helena	1994 (IUCN)	Undetermined.	
1885	Tristram's pintail	Anas acuta modesta	Sidney Island, Phoenix Islands, Kiribati		Undetermined.	
1885	Pindus quillwort	Isoetes heldreichii	Southern Pindus Mountains, Greece		Undetermined.	
1886	Sri Lanka bubble-nest frog	Pseudophilautus adspersus	Nuwara Eliya, Sri Lanka	2004 (IUCN)	Possibly habitat loss caused by agricultural expansion.	
1886		Sporobolus durus	Weather Post, Ascension Island	2003 (IUCN)	Undetermined.	
1886	Martinique house wren	Troglodytes aedon martinicensis	Martinique		Undetermined.	
1886	Bennett's seaweed	Vanvoorstia bennettiana	Port Jackson, Australia	2003 (IUCN)	Habitat loss and pollution.	
1886-1888	Emperor rat	Uromys imperator	Guadalcanal, Solomon Islands		Undetermined.	
1886-1888	Guadalcanal rat	Uromys porculus	Guadalcanal, Solomon Islands		Undetermined.	
1887	Raoul Island pigeon	Hemiphaga novaeseelandiae ssp.	Raoul, Kermadec Islands, New Zealand		Hunting and predation by introduced cats.	
1887	Ryukyu kingfisher	Todiramphus cinnamomimus miyakoensis	Miyako Island, Ryukyu, Japan		Undetermined.	
1887		Wendlandia psychotrioides	Mount Bellenden Ker, Queensland, Australia		Undetermined.	
1888	Wailupe Valley treecotton	Kokia lanceolata	Makaku, Koko Head, and Wailupe Valley, Oahu, Hawaii, United States	1998 (IUCN)	Undetermined.	
1888	Lesser Indian rhinoceros	Rhinoceros sondaicus inermis	Northeast India, Bangladesh, and Myanmar		Habitat loss, poaching, and deforestation.	
1888		Valerianella affinis	Jebel Ma’alih, Socotra, Yemen	2004 (IUCN)	Undetermined.	
1888-1899		Pluchea glutinosa	Socotra, Yemen	2004 (IUCN)	Undetermined.	
c. 1889	Hokkaido wolf	Canis lupus hattai	Hokkaido, Sakhalin, Kamchatka, Iturup and Kunashir		Extermination campaign.	
1889	Cuban macaw	Ara tricolor	Cuba and Juventud	2000 (IUCN)	Hunting for food and the exotic pet trade.	
1889	Bonin wood pigeon	Columba versicolor	Bonin Islands, Japan	1988 (IUCN)	Deforestation and predation by introduced cats and rats.	
1889		Cynorkis catatii	Mandritsara, Mahajanga, Madagascar		Undetermined.	
1889		Diuris bracteata	Near Gladesville, Sydney, Australia		Undetermined.	
1889		Dryopteris ascensionis (Note: Unconfirmed sighting near Cottage Garden in 1976.)	Summit of Green Mountain, Ascension Island	1998 (IUCN)	Competition with introduced plants.	
1889	Whiteline topminnow	Fundulus albolineatus	Huntsville, Alabama, United States	1986 (IUCN)	Habitat destruction.	
1889	Eastern hare-wallaby	Lagorchestes leporides	Interior southeastern Australia	1982 (IUCN)	Possibly habitat loss due to livestock grazing and wildfires.	
1889	Bonin nankeen night heron	Nycticorax caledonicus crassirostris	Chichi-jima and Nakōdo-jima, Bonin Islands, Japan		Undetermined.	
1889	Sturdee's pipistrelle	Pipistrellus sturdeei	Haha-jima, Bonin Islands, Japan	1996 (IUCN) 2004	Undetermined.	

=== 1890s ===
Last record	Common name	Binomial name	Former range	Declared extinct	Causes	Picture
c. 1890	Portuguese ibex	Capra pyrenaica lusitanica	Portuguese-Galician border		Hunting.	
1890	New Caledonian rail (Note: Unconfirmed report in 1984 (IUCN).)	Cabalus lafresnayanus	New Caledonia		Probably predation by introduced dogs, cats, pigs, and rats.	
1890	Morat whitefish	Coregonus restrictus	Lake Morat, Switzerland	2008 (IUCN)	Likely eutrophication.	
1890	Macquarie parakeet (Note: 1891 reports were based on hearsay (Taylor, 1979).)	Cyanoramphus novaezelandiae erythrotis	Macquarie Island, Australia	1894	Increased predation by introduced cats and weka after rabbits were introduced, boosting their numbers.	
1890	Bar-winged rail (Note: Unconfirmed sightings in 1971 and 1973 (IUCN).)	Hypotaenidia poeciloptera	Fiji	1994 (IUCN)	Predation by introduced cats and mongooses.	
1890	Togo mouse	Leimacomys buettneri	Adele, Togo and possibly Ghana		Undetermined.	
1890-1899		Psiadia schweinfurthii	Socotra, Yemen	2004 (IUCN)	Undetermined.	
1890-1899	ʻOlaʻa peppered looper moth	Tritocleis microphylla	Hawaii, United States	Undetermined.		
1891	Sulu bleeding-heart (Note: Unconfirmed reports until 1995 (Hume, 2017).)	Gallicolumba menagei	Tawi-tawi, Sulu archipelago, Philippines		Possibly deforestation and hunting.	
1891	Raoul Island banded rail	Hypotaenidia sp.	Raoul, Kermadec Islands, New Zealand	1944	Predation by introduced cats or rats.	
1891	Laysan fan palm	Pritchardia sp. "Laysan"	Laysan, Hawaii, United States	1896	Deforestation for charcoal production.	
1891	Lesser koa finch	Rhodacanthis flaviceps	Hawaiʻi Island, Hawaii, United States	1893; 1988 (IUCN)	Undetermined.	
1892	Maui Nui ʻakialoa	Akialoa lanaiensis	Lana'i, Hawaii, United States	2016 (IUCN)	Possibly habitat destruction and introduced disease.	
1892		Amperea xiphoclada var. pedicellata	Double Bay, Sydney, New South Wales		Undetermined.	
1892	ʻUla-ʻai-hawane (Note: Unconfirmed sighting in 1937 (IUCN).)	Ciridops anna	Hawaiʻi Island, Hawaii, United States	1988 (IUCN)	Undetermined.	
1892		Embelia flueckigeri	Russell River, Queensland, Australia		Undetermined.	
1892	Nendo tube-nosed fruit bat (Note: A 1907 sighting is considered erroneous (IUCN).)	Nyctimene sanctacrucis	Santa Cruz Islands, Solomon Islands	1994 (IUCN)	Undetermined. Could be conspecific with the Island tube-nosed fruit bat.	
1892	St. Vincent pygmy rice rat	Oligoryzomys victus	St. Vincent	2008 (IUCN)	Probably predation by introduced brown rats, black rats, and mongooses.	
1892	Puerto Rican parakeet	Psittacara maugei	Puerto Rico and Mona Island		Possibly deforestation, hunting, and disease.	
1892	Marianne white-eye	Zosterops semiflavus	Marianne Island, Seychelles	1940; 2016 (IUCN)	Deforestation, competition with introduced birds and predation by back rats.	
1892	Blue-gray mouse	Pseudomys glaucus	Queensland and New South Wales, Australia	2016 (IUCN)	Predation by cats.	
1893		Aeschynomene ruspoliana	Southern Ethiopia		Undetermined.	
1893		Cynorkis usambarae	East Usambara Mountains, Tanzania		Undetermined.	
1893	Lanai pomace fly	Drosophila lanaiensis	Lanai and possibly Oahu, Hawaii, United States	1986 (IUCN)	Undetermined.	
1893	Harelip sucker	Lagochila lacera	Southeastern United States	1986 (IUCN)	Possibly water siltation and pollution.	
1893		Leichhardtia araujacea	Northern Queensland, Australia		Undetermined.	
1893	Seychelles parakeet	Psittacula wardi	Seychelles	1906; 1988 (IUCN)	Hunting and habitat loss to agriculture.	
1893-1895	Chatham rail	Cabalus modestus	Chatham Islands, New Zealand	1988 (IUCN)	Habitat destruction, predation and competition with introduced mammals.	
1894	Kona grosbeak	Chloridops kona	Hawaiʻi Island, Hawaii, United States	1988 (IUCN)	Undetermined.	
1894	North Island takahē	Porhyrio mantelli	North Island, New Zealand	2000 (IUCN)	Climate-induced reduction of grasslands and hunting.	
1895	Kauai undulata delissea	Delissea undulata subsp. kauaiensis	West of Hanapepe River, Kauai, Hawaii, United States		Undetermined.	
1895	Hawkins's rail	Diaphorapteryx hawkinsi	Chatham Islands, New Zealand	2005 (IUCN)	Hunting.	
1895	Chatham fernbird	Poodytes rufescens	Chatham Islands, New Zealand	1988 (IUCN)	Predation by introduced cats.	
1895	Cronin's tetratheca	Tetratheca fasciculata	Wagin, Western Australia		Undetermined.	
1895	Lyall's wren	Traversia lyalli	New Zealand	1895; 1986 (IUCN)	Habitat loss and predation by introduced cats.	
c. 1895	New Zealand bittern	Ixobrychus novaezelandiae	New Zealand	1988 (IUCN)	Probably predation by introduced stoats, after its numbers had already been depleted by rats and cats.	
1896		Byttneria ivorensis	Ivory Coast	1998 (IUCN)	Undetermined.	
1896	Greater koa finch	Rhodacanthis palmeri	Hawaiʻi Island, Hawaii, United States	1906; 1988 (IUCN)	Possibly habitat destruction and introduced avian malaria.	
1896	Newfoundland wolf (Note: Unconfirmed sighting in 1911 (Glover, 1942).)	Canis lupus beothucus	Newfoundland, Canada		Hunting.	
1896	Short-tailed hopping mouse	Notomys amplus	South Australia and Northern Territory, Australia	2016 (IUCN)	Predation by cats and foxes.	
1897		Eleocharis lepta	Cape Peninsula, South Africa		Undetermined.	
1897	Gull Island vole	Microtus pennsylvanicus nesophilus	Great Gull and Little Gull Islands, New York		Habitat destruction.	
1897	Martinique giant rice rat	Megalomys desmarestii	Martinique	1994 (IUCN)	Predation by introduced mongooses.	
1897	Nelson's rice rat	Oryzomys nelsoni	Central María Madre Island, Mexico	1996 (IUCN)	Competition with introduced black rats.	
1897	Guadalupe towhee	Pipilio maculatus consobrinus	Guadalupe Island, Mexico	1954	Habitat destruction by introduced goats and predation by cats.	
1897	Guadalupe wren	Thryomanes bewickii brevicauda	Guadalupe Island, Mexico	1906	Habitat destruction by introduced goats.	
1897	Stephens Island piopio	Turnagra capensis minor	Stephens Island, New Zealand	1898	Predation by introduced cats.	
1897	Lavafield false ohelo	Wikstroemia hanalei	Kauai, Hawaii, United States	2016 (IUCN)	Undetermined.	
1897–1898	Bulldog rat	Rattus nativitatis	Christmas Island, Australia	2016 (IUCN)	Presumed extinct after the introduction of diseases carried by black rats in 1900.	
1898		Angraecum potamophilum	Mahajanga, Madagascar		Undetermined.	
1898	Woolly-stalked begonia	Begonia eiromischa	Betong Island, Malaysia	2007 (IUCN)	Deforestation.	
1898	Hawaii mamo	Drepanis pacifica	Hawaiʻi Island, Hawaii, United States	1988 (IUCN)	Hunting, habitat destruction, and introduced disease.	
1899	Culebra Island amazon	Amazona vittata gracilipes	Culebra Island of Puerto Rico	1912	Deforestation and persecution by crop farmers.	
1899	Kauaʻi nukupuʻu (Note: Unconfirmed report from 2007.)	Hemignathus hanapepe	Kauaʻi, Hawaii, United States	2021; 2024 (IUCN)	Undetermined.	
1899		Pseudophilautus halyi	Pattipola, Sri Lanka	2004 (IUCN)	Possibly habitat loss.	
before 1900	Ukrainian migratory lamprey	Eudontomyzon sp. nov. 'migratory'	Dniestr, Dniepr, and Don River drainages	2008 (IUCN)	Undetermined.	
before 1900	Sooty crayfish	Pacifastacus nigrescens	San Francisco Bay, California, United States	2010	Invasive fish and crayfish species, and urban development.	

== See also ==
- Timeline of extinctions in the Holocene
- Timeline of extinctions in the 20th century
- Timeline of the 19th century
- 19th century in science
