= Gadwall (disambiguation) =

The gadwall (Mareca strepera) is a dabbling duck of the family Anatidae.

Gadwall may also refer to:

- Coues's gadwall or Washington Island gadwall (Mareca strepera couesi), an extinct subspecies of the gadwall

Other:

- USS Gadwall (AM-362), was an Admirable-class minesweeper built for the U.S. Navy during World War II
- George Best Belfast City Airport - originally Syndeham Airport c. 1938 and acquired by the Royal Navy as HMS Gadwall during World War II (from RAF as RAF Belfast in 1943 and returned back 1973 before becoming civilian in 1978).

== See also ==
- Gertrude Gadwall, a fictional duck character in Disney films
