= Mautodontha =

Scientific classification
- Kingdom: Animalia
- Phylum: Mollusca
- Class: Gastropoda
- Order: Stylommatophora
- Family: Charopidae
- Genus: Mautodontha; Solem, 1976

Genus of gastropods

Mautodontha is a genus of small air-breathing land snails, terrestrial pulmonate gastropod mollusks in the family Charopidae.

== Species ==
Species within the genus Mautodontha include:

- Mautodontha acuticosta
- Mautodontha boraborensis
- Mautodontha ceuthma
- Mautodontha consimilis
- Mautodontha consobrina
- Mautodontha maupiensis
- Mautodontha parvidens
- Mautodontha punctiperforata
- Mautodontha saintjohni
- Mautodontha subtilis
- Mautodontha unilamellata
- Mautodontha zebrina
