= John Latham =

John Latham may refer to:

- John Latham (ornithologist) (1740–1837), British physician, naturalist and author
- John Latham (1761–1843), English physician, President of the Royal College of Physicians
- John Latham (1787–1853), his son, English magistrate and poet
- John Latham (judge) (1877–1964), Australian judge and politician
- John Cridland Latham (1888–1975), U.S. Army soldier and Medal of Honor recipient
- John Latham (artist) (1921–2006), conceptual artist born in Zambia
- John Latham (Whitewater), American bank executive involved in Whitewater controversy, 1990s
- Jack Latham (1914–1987), American actor
- John Latham (physicist) (1937–2021), British physicist
