= USS Gadwall =

Minesweeper of the United States Navy

History

United States
- Name: USS Gadwall
- Builder: Willamette Iron and Steel Works
- Laid down: 24 May 1943
- Launched: 15 July 1943
- Commissioned: 23 June 1945
- Decommissioned: 14 June 1946
- Reclassified: MSF-362, 7 February 1955
- Stricken: 1 November 1966
- Fate: Sold for scrap, 10 April 1967

General characteristics
- Class & type: Admirable-class minesweeper
- Displacement: 650 tons
- Length: 184 ft 6 in (56.24 m)
- Beam: 33 ft (10 m)
- Draft: 9 ft 9 in (2.97 m)
- Propulsion: 2 × ALCO 539 diesel engines, 1,710 shp (1.3 MW); Farrel-Birmingham single reduction gear; 2 shafts
- Speed: 14.8 knots (27.4 km/h)
- Complement: 104
- Armament: 1 × 3"/50 caliber gun DP; 2 × twin Bofors 40 mm guns; 1 × Hedgehog anti-submarine mortar; 2 × Depth charge tracks

Service record
- Part of: US Pacific Fleet (1945-1946); Atlantic Reserve Fleet (1946-1966)

USS Gadwall (AM-362) was an Admirable-class minesweeper built for the United States Navy during World War II. She was built to clear minefields in offshore waters.

Gadwall was launched 15 July 1943 by Willamette Iron and Steel Works, Portland, Oregon; sponsored by Mrs. Charles McNary; and commissioned 23 June 1945.

== End-of-war Pacific Theatre activity ==
Gadwall departed Astoria, Oregon, 11 July 1945 for shakedown training out of San Pedro, Los Angeles, followed by mine warfare exercises and amphibious maneuvers with fleet units off the California bases of Santa Barbara, San Diego, and Newport Beach.

== Post-war inactivation and decommissioning ==
On 7 December 1945 she put to sea from San Diego for inactivation overhaul at New Orleans, Louisiana, until 11 April 1946. She then shifted to Orange, Texas, where she decommissioned 14 June 1946 and was assigned to the Texas Group, Atlantic Reserve Fleet.

She was reclassified MSF-362 on 7 February 1955 and she remained in reserve berthed at Orange, Texas, until struck from the Navy List 1 November 1966. Gadwall was stripped and designated for sale 10 April 1967.
