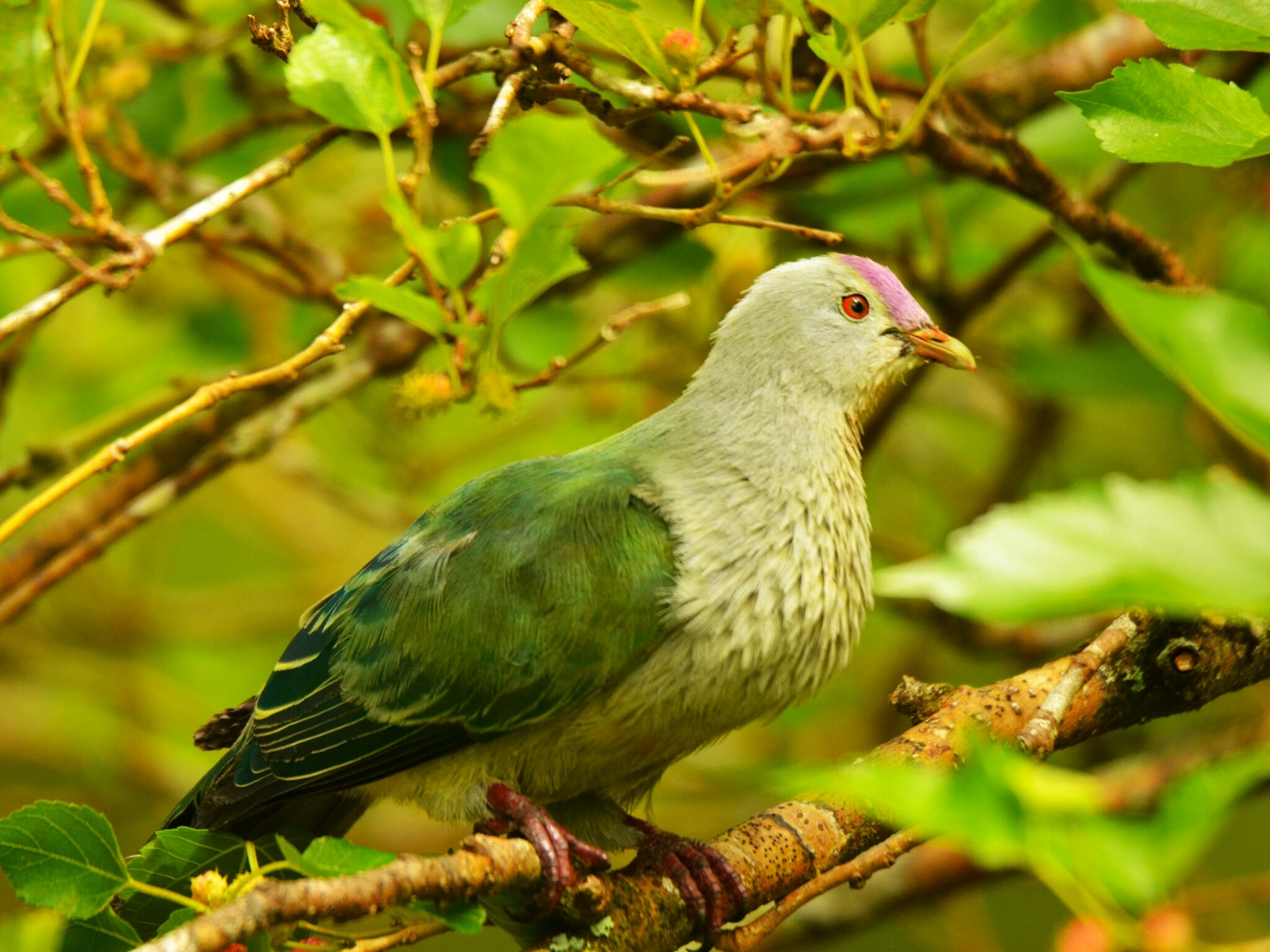

Conservation status
- Near Threatened (IUCN 3.1)

Scientific classification
- Kingdom: Animalia
- Phylum: Chordata
- Class: Aves
- Order: Columbiformes
- Family: Columbidae
- Genus: Ptilinopus
- Species: P. rarotongensis

Binomial name
- Ptilinopus rarotongensis Hartlaub & Finsch, 1871

Subspecies
- P. r. rarotongensis – 1871; P. r. goodwini – 1974

= Lilac-crowned fruit dove =

Species of bird

The lilac-crowned fruit dove (Ptilinopus rarotongensis), also known as the Rarotonga fruit-dove or Cook Islands fruit-dove, is one of over 50 species of Ptilinopus (the fruit doves or fruit pigeons).

Some birds that appear similar are the scarlet-breasted Ptilope, Layard's Ptilope, and Hutton's Ptilope, among others.

Their trophic level is that of an herbivore, and their trophic niche is a frugivore (i.e. they mostly eat fruit).

== Taxonomy and systematics ==
The lilac-crowned fruit dove is endemic to the Cook Islands and is split into two subspecies:

- Ptilinopus rarotongensis rarotongensis – occurs on Rarotonga
- Ptilinopus rarotongensis goodwini – occurs on Atiu

== Etymology ==
The genus name, Ptilinopus, comes from the Ancient Greek πτιλον (ptilon), meaning "feather", and πους (pous), which further derives from ποδος (todos), meaning "foot). Thus, the genus name means "feather-foot". The specific epithet, rarotongensis, is simply a modification of Rarotonga, where these birds live.

The subspecies' names, rarotongensis and goodwini, are a reptation of the species name and an honorific to Richard "Derek" Goodwin, a British ornithologist, conservationist, collector, and aviculturist, respectively.

== Habitat ==
The lilac-crowned fruit dove is common throughout the forest near the makatea (raised coral limestone) and inland of Aitu, however, on Rarotonga, it is only present on the inland mountains, typically in forests. They live at an elevation of 0–652 m (0–2,139 ft). They are non-migratory and sedentary.

== Description ==
The dominant colors of the lilac-crowned fruit dove are grey, brown, green, and white. Various other colors are also apparent, including black, yellow, purple, beige, and others.

From tip of the beak to end of the tail, they measure 20 to 24 cm (7.9 to 9.4 in). They weigh 108.1 g (3.81 oz). Their wingspan is 24.9 cm (9.8 in). The length of their legs is 2.55 cm (1.00 in). The length of their beak is 0.7 cm (0.28 in), while height and width are 0.39 cm (0.15 in) and 0.41 cm (0.16 in), respectively.

The lilac-crowned fruit dove lives, on average, to four years, though some have lived to 13.54 years. They reach reproductive age at 1.7 years.

== Status ==
Due to the lilac-crowned fruit dove occurring only on two small islands now, having an extent of occurrence of only 1,900 km^{2} (470,000 acres), they are at risk from sudden storms. Another potential danger is the introduction of invasive species and diseases. The population is seen as stable but is no larger than 2,500 individuals. The IUCN categorized the dove as "Near Threatened" as of 2021.
