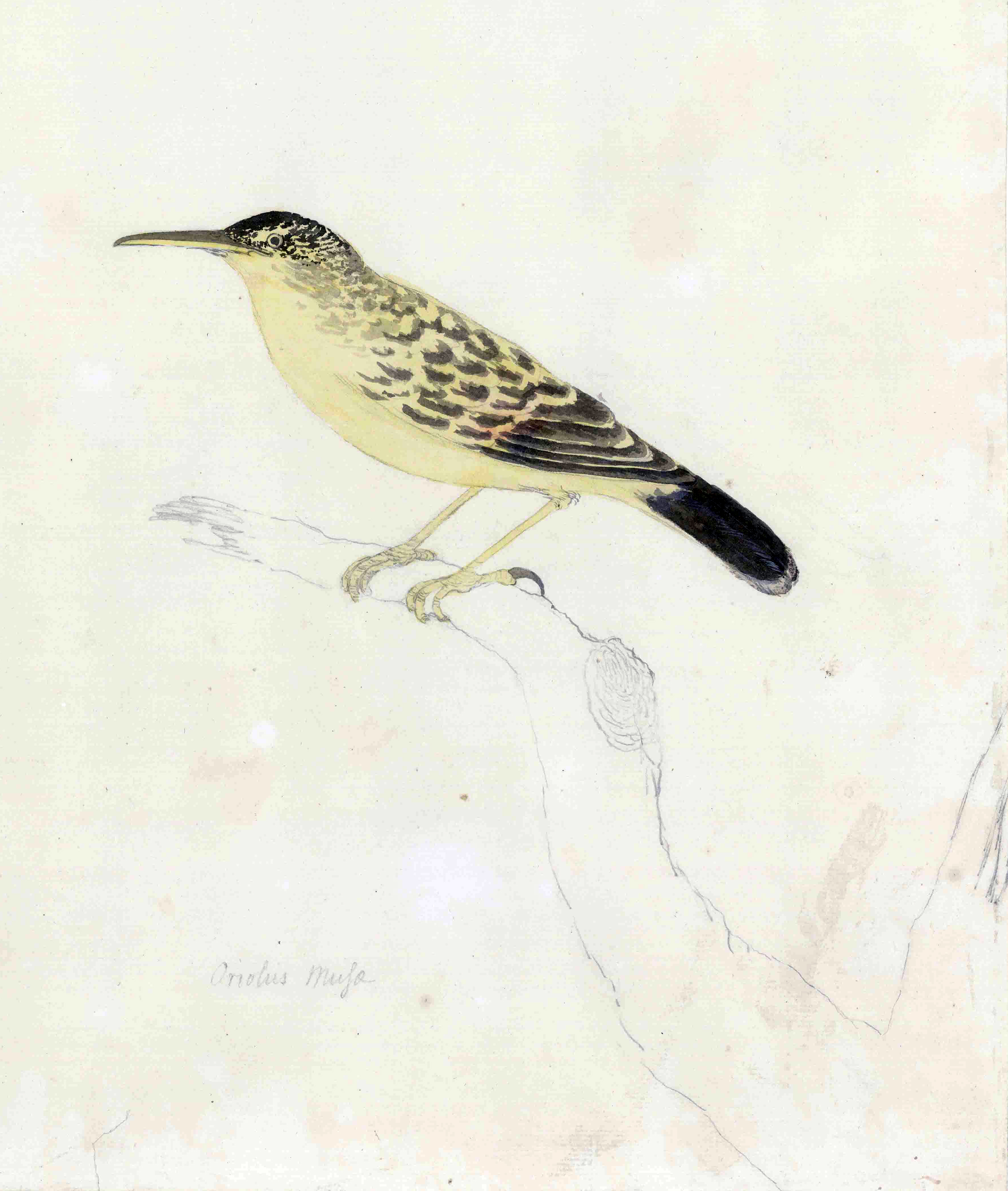
- Acrocephalus musae by Georg Forster

Conservation status
- Extinct (IUCN 3.1)

Scientific classification
- Kingdom: Animalia
- Phylum: Chordata
- Class: Aves
- Order: Passeriformes
- Family: Acrocephalidae
- Genus: Acrocephalus
- Species: †A. musae

Binomial name
- †Acrocephalus musae (J. R. Forster, 1844)

= Garrett's reed warbler =

Species of bird

Garrett's reed warbler (Acrocephalus musae), sometimes called the Society Islands reed warbler or Forster's reed-warbler, is an extinct species of reed warbler in the family Acrocephalidae. It was endemic to Raiatea and Huahine in the Society Islands.

It was formerly considered a subspecies of the Tahiti reed warbler.

There are 2 subspecies:

- Acrocephalus musae garretti - Huahine Island, extinct (19th century?)
- Acrocephalus musae musae - Raiatea Island, extinct (19th century?)
