= Mautodontha subtilis =

Conservation status
- Extinct (IUCN 2.3)

Scientific classification
- Kingdom: Animalia
- Phylum: Mollusca
- Class: Gastropoda
- Order: Stylommatophora
- Family: Charopidae
- Genus: Mautodontha
- Species: †M. subtilis

Binomial name
- †Mautodontha subtilis Garrett, 1884

Species of gastropod

†Mautodontha subtilis was a species of small air-breathing land snails, terrestrial pulmonate gastropod mollusks in the family Charopidae.

This species was endemic to French Polynesia. It is now extinct.
