= Xanthostemon sebertii =

Conservation status
- Extinct (IUCN 2.3)

Scientific classification
- Kingdom: Plantae
- Clade: Tracheophytes
- Clade: Angiosperms
- Clade: Eudicots
- Clade: Rosids
- Order: Myrtales
- Family: Myrtaceae
- Genus: Xanthostemon
- Species: †X. sebertii

Binomial name
- †Xanthostemon sebertii Guillaumin

Extinct species of flowering plant

Xanthostemon sebertii was a species of plant in the family Myrtaceae. It was endemic to New Caledonia.
