= Prony Bay =

Bay in New Caledonia

Coordinates: 22.36°S 166.86°E

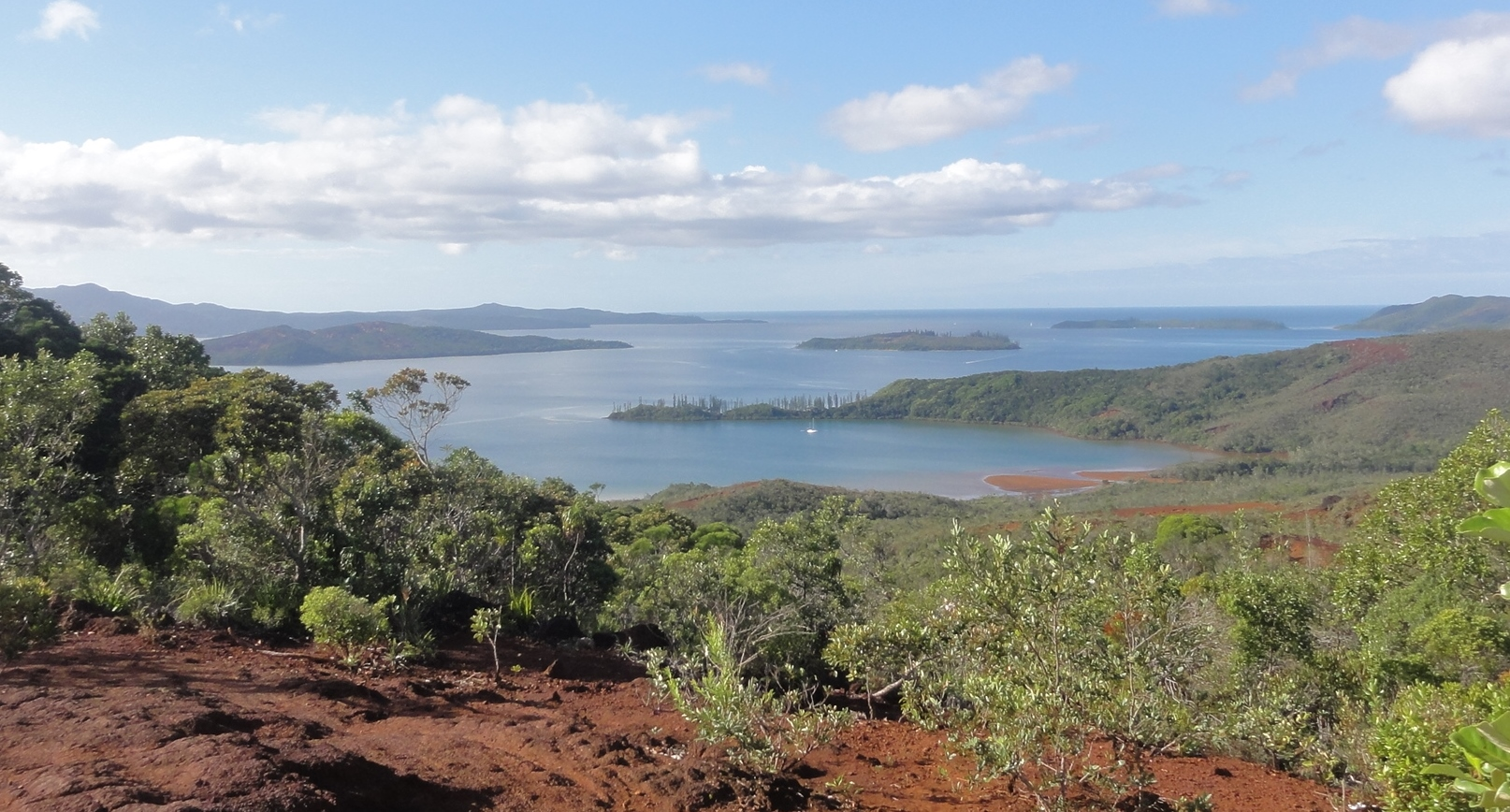
Prony Bay from above

Prony Bay or Baie de Prony is a bay of the southern end of New Caledonia. A number of small streams flow into the bay, including the Rivière Bleue and the Ruisseau de la Bergerie. Deposits of red clay increased between 1955 and 1968 due to extensive mining in the area. There are said to be oversized madrepore species growing in turbid waters, according to diving reports.
