= Insular myotis =

Conservation status
- Data Deficient (IUCN 3.1)

Scientific classification
- Kingdom: Animalia
- Phylum: Chordata
- Class: Mammalia
- Order: Chiroptera
- Family: Vespertilionidae
- Genus: Myotis
- Species: M. insularum

Binomial name
- Myotis insularum Dobson, 1878

Species of bat

The insular myotis (Myotis insularum) is one of over 100 of species of vesper bat in the genus Myotis. It is possibly endemic to the Samoan Islands, which include Samoa, and American Samoa
