= Weinmannia spiraeoides =

Conservation status
- Vulnerable (IUCN 3.1)

Scientific classification
- Kingdom: Plantae
- Clade: Tracheophytes
- Clade: Angiosperms
- Clade: Eudicots
- Clade: Rosids
- Order: Oxalidales
- Family: Cunoniaceae
- Genus: Weinmannia
- Species: W. spiraeoides

Binomial name
- Weinmannia spiraeoides A.Gray

Extinct species of flowering plant

Weinmannia spiraeoides is a species of flowering plant in the family Cunoniaceae. It is a small tree endemic to Ovalau in Fiji. It grows in lowland tropical rain forest at 150 metres elevation.
