= Mangareva reed warbler =

Conservation status
- Extinct (IUCN 3.1)

Scientific classification
- Kingdom: Animalia
- Phylum: Chordata
- Class: Aves
- Order: Passeriformes
- Family: Acrocephalidae
- Genus: Acrocephalus
- Species: †A. astrolabii

Binomial name
- †Acrocephalus astrolabii Holyoak & Thibault, 1978

Species of bird

The Mangareva reed warbler or Astrolabe reed warbler (Acrocephalus astrolabii) is a presumed extinct songbird that existed on Mangareva in the Gambier Islands. It is known from only two specimens, and is believed to have gone extinct in the mid-19th century, likely due to deforestation and the introduction of exotic predators.

== Description ==
The Mangareva reed warbler was 17 cm (6.7 in) long. It was generally dull greyish-olive above with pale yellowish eyebrow and underparts, and a dark line through the eye. The bill was dark from above and buff from below, the iris dark brown, and the legs and feet grey. The female was slightly smaller than the male.

The species was very similar to the also extinct Guam reed warbler (A. luscinius), but differed in its larger size, relatively shorter bill, and extraordinarily stout feet and claws.

== Taxonomic history ==
Both specimens were collected in an unknown date by Jules Dumont d'Urville, who visited the South Pacific aboard the French ship Astrolabe in 1826-1829 and again on the Zélée in 1838-1839. They were only studied and recognized as a new species by Holyoak and Thibault a century and a half later.

D'Urville recorded the locality of collection of the first specimen as "Mangereva" in the Gambier Islands and the second as "Nouhera" (Nuku Hiva, Marquesas Islands). This was considered an error by Holyoak and Thibault, due to the great distance between both islands and the similarity of the species to warblers from Micronesia. Because the Astrolabe was known to have visited Losap, Truk, Guam, Yap, and Pelelin in Micronesia, and other warbler species are known from Guam and Truk, they hypothesized that the species was native to Yap, where no ornithological survey was made until 1872, presumably after the native warbler had become extinct. The Saipan reed warbler (A. hiwae) was named as its closest extant relative.

However, mitochondrial DNA and morphological analysis in 2011 showed that the Astrolabe reed warbler was only distantly related to the Saipan reed warbler and much closer to the Northern Marquesan reed warbler (A. percernis), making a strong biogeographic case for the species to have come from the Gambier Islands after all. The authors of the study also found travellers accounts and descriptions of warblers collected in the Gambier Islands that were subsequently lost, and evidence that the Marquesan native name for reed warblers, komako, was still used in the islands in 1934.
