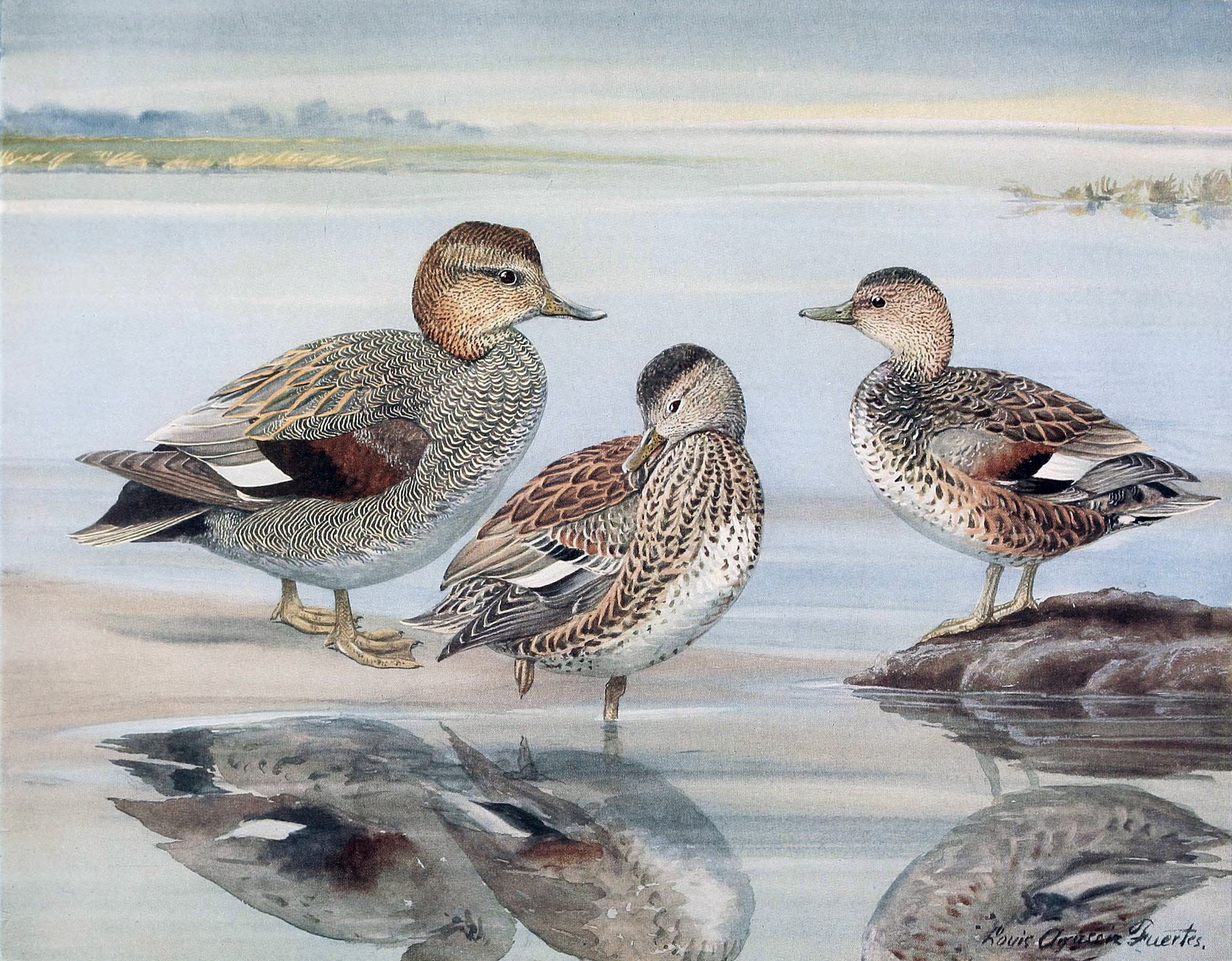
- Illustration of a male and female gadwall, with a male Coues's gadwall, by Louis Agassiz Fuertes

Conservation status
- Extinct (1874) (IUCN 3.1)

Scientific classification
- Kingdom: Animalia
- Phylum: Chordata
- Class: Aves
- Order: Anseriformes
- Family: Anatidae
- Genus: Mareca
- Species: M. strepera
- Subspecies: †M. s. couesi

Trinomial name
- †Mareca strepera couesi (Streets, 1876)

Synonyms
- Anas strepera couesi; Chaulelasmus couesi Streets, 1876

= Coues's gadwall =

Extinct subspecies of bird

Coues's gadwall or the Washington Island gadwall (Mareca strepera couesi) is an extinct dabbling duck which is only known by two immature specimens from the Pacific island of Teraina, (Note: formerly known as Washington Island — Dieter Luther mentions a supposed occurrence on "New York Island" in his book, which is another archaic name for Teraina.) Line Islands, Kiribati. They are in the National Museum of Natural History in Washington, D.C. The bird was named in honor of ornithologist Elliott Coues.

== Description ==
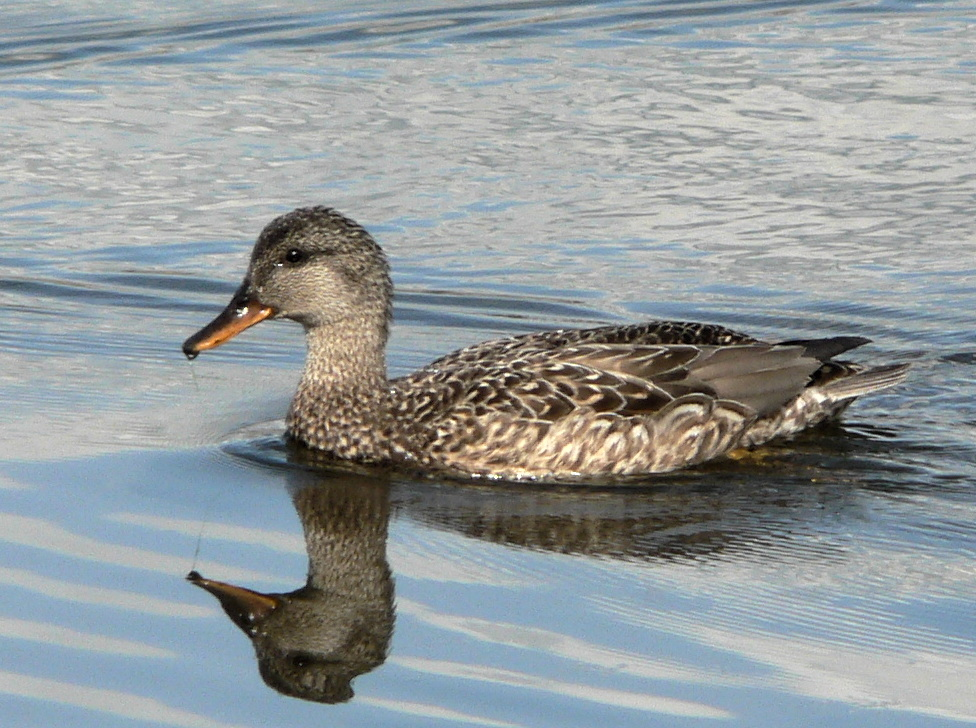
Female common gadwall. Streets' Washington Island specimens differed only in minor details (see text).

A male and a female are known, which resemble the immature appearance of the common gadwall except for the black bill with a higher number of filtering lamellae, black feet, and the much inferior size (which may be due to the birds not being fully grown). The male resembles a male common gadwall in eclipse plumage, save for some white speckling on the breast and back. The female looks like a small common gadwall female; the primary wing coverts were not patterned black, and the inner web of the secondary remiges was grey instead of white.

Measurements are: wing, 19.9 cm; bill, 3.7 cm; tarsus 3.6 cm. This means the birds were the size of a Cape teal or a garganey, with a total length of 40–45 cm. As the birds were not fully adult when shot, it is not clear whether they would not have grown a bit larger.

== Status and extinction ==
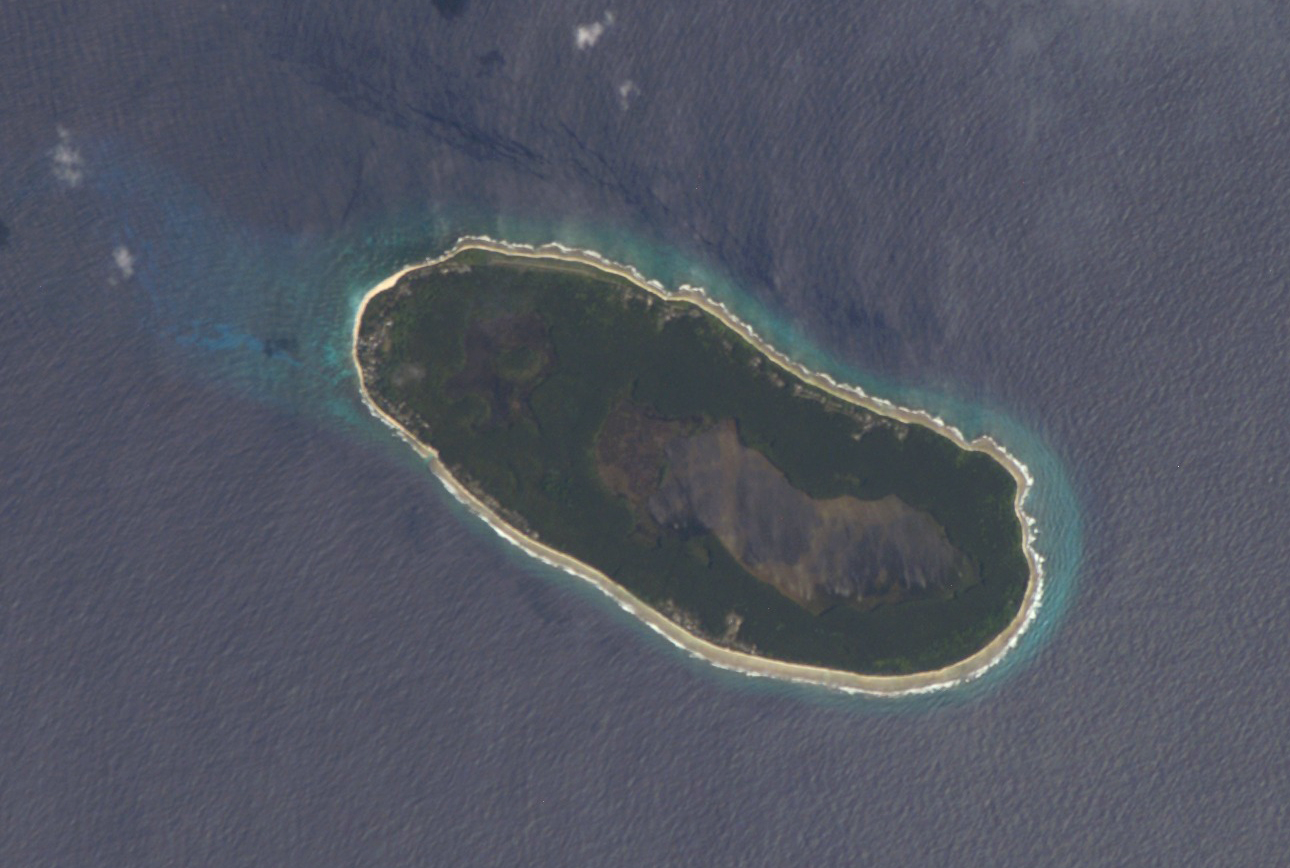
Teraina (formerly Washington Island)

The status of this bird is controversial. While many scientists consider it an island dwarf subspecies of the gadwall (Mareca strepera) others argue that the two individuals might have been just juveniles of a local breeding population that might not even have been taxonomically distinct. The common gadwall (Mareca strepara strepara) is a known vagrant to the Tuamotu Islands (Kolbe wrote "Tahiti", which is a misreading of Greenway) and Hawaii for example, which are about the same distance from the species' breeding grounds, as is Teraina (which, moreover, lies in between these two groups). This makes it entirely possible that the two Coues's gadwalls that were shot were just the offspring of a few vagrant common gadwalls, maybe settling there after being wounded by hunters. On the other hand, Streets' reports suggest that there was a population of these ducks of some size present, and thus they may have lived there for quite some time and indeed be worthy of recognition as a distinct taxon.

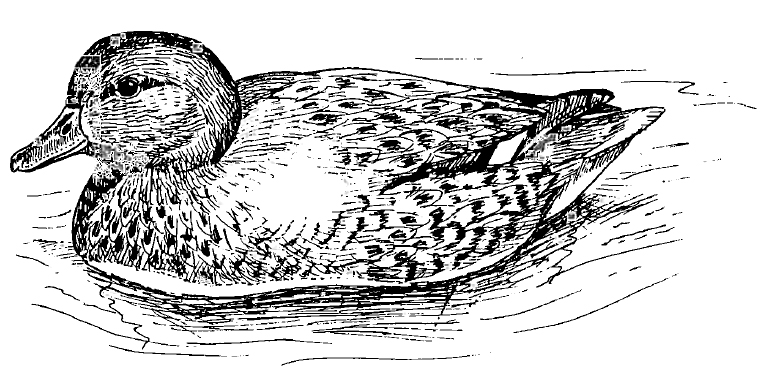
Illustration by Julian P. Hume

The observations of the two individuals took place in January 1874. The subspecies' description was by Thomas Hale Streets (1847–1925) in 1876. Streets reported about the two immatures he shot, which were found in a peat bog.

The cause of its extinction might be the extensive hunting by settlers of Tabuaeran (Fanning Island), which had shot large numbers of migrant ducks on both Teraina and Tabuaeran each year. W. G. Anderson, a local resident stated in 1926 that, growing up on Teraina and Tabueran around the turn of the century, he had never encountered a native population of gadwalls on Teraina. Thus, the subspecies' disappearance can be fixed to the last quarter of the 19th century, between the mid-1870s and 1900.
