= List of marsupials by population =

This is a list of estimated global populations of Marsupials (infraclass Marsupialia) species. This list is not comprehensive, as not all Marsupials have had their numbers quantified.

Some members of Marsupialia are extinct, and thus have population sizes of zero:

- Thylacine (Thylacinus cynocephalus) - last recorded wild individual captured in 1933, and died in captivity in 1936.
- Liverpool Plains striped bandicoot (Perameles fasciata) - went extinct in 1840s.
- Marl (Perameles myosuros) - last seen in 1907, extinct circa 1910.
- South-eastern striped bandicoot (Perameles notina) - extinct sometime in late 19th century.
- Nullarbor barred bandicoot (Perameles papillon) - formerly considered a subspecies of P. bougainville. Last record from 1920s, believed to have gone extinct circa 1928.
- Desert bandicoot (Perameles eremiana) - last confirmed record from 1943. Unconfirmed reports persisted into the late 1960s.
- Southern pig-footed bandicoot (Chaeropus ecaudatus) - last specimen collected in 1900, but likely persisted into the 1930s.
- Northern pig-footed bandicoot, or Yirratji (Chaeropus yirratji) - likely went extinct in the 1950s.
- Lake Mackay hare-wallaby, or Kuluwarri (Lagorchestes asomatus) - known from a single specimen taken in 1932. Likely went extinct by 1960.
- Eastern hare-wallaby (Lagorchestes leporides) - last recorded in 1890.
- Toolache wallaby (Notamacropus greyi) - last confirmed records from 1924; species persisted in captivity until 1939. Some unconfirmed reports were made as late as the 1970s, but could not be verified.
- Crescent nail-tailed wallaby (Onychogalea lunata) - no confirmed records since 1940s. Estimated to have gone extinct circa 1963.
- Desert bettong (Bettongia anhydra) - known from a single specimen collected in 1933. Likely went extinct circa 1960.
- Nullarbor dwarf bettong (Bettongia pusilla) - first described in 1997, but is expected to have been extant at the time of European settlement in Oceania.
- Desert rat-kangaroo (Caloprymnus campestris) - last confirmed record from 1935; unconfirmed reports have occurred as recently as 2013, but species has not been found despite extensive searches.
- Broad-faced potoroo (Potorous platyops) - last recorded in 1875.
- Crest-tailed mulgara (Dasycercus cristicauda) - last confirmed sighting occurred in 1867. Species has historically been taxonomically confused with Dasycercus hillieri, to which all extant populations of the species complex are now consigned.

Common name	Scientific name	IUCN Red List status	Trend	Global population estimate (year)	Population notes	Range	Image
Thylacine	Thylacinus cynocephalus	EX	N/A	0 (1936)	Last known individual died in captivity on 7 September, 1936. Last known wild individual was captured in 1933.		
Wondiwoi tree-kangaroo	Dendrolagus mayri	CR	?	< 50 (2016)	May be extinct. Any extant population is expected to be less than 50 individuals.		
Teleformin cuscus	Phalanger matanim	CR	?	< 50 (2016)	May be extinct. Species is known from six specimens.		
Gilbert's potoroo	Potorous gilbertii	CR	▼	50 (2016)	Population was halved between 2012 - 2015 due to fires.		
Tenkile	Dendrolagus scottae	CR	Steady	200 (2019)			
Northern hairy-nosed wombat	Lasiorhinus krefftii	CR	Steady	315 (2021)	IUCN estimates population at 80 mature individuals (2016).		
Kangaroo Island dunnart	Sminthopsis aitkeni	CR	▼	< 500 (2008)	Considered by IUCN to be a subspecies of sooty dunnart (S. fuliginosus). Population may now be lower due to habitat damage from fires and predation by feral cats.		
Cape York rock-wallaby	Petrogale coenensis	EN	▼	500-2,000 (2020)	Total population is most likely ~1,000 individuals.		
Golden-mantled tree-kangaroo	Dendrolagus pulcherrimus	CR	Steady	500 (2016)	Value given is a maximum estimate for total population.		
Dibbler	Parantechinus apicalis	EN	▼	700 (2016)			
Mount Claro rock-wallaby	Petrogale sharmani	VU	?	750 (2016)	Total population was estimated in 2012 to be "probably fewer than 800 individuals."		
Bridled nail-tail wallaby	Onychogalea fraenata	VU	Steady	800-1,100 (2016)	The largest subpopulation occurs at Australian Wildlife Conservancy's Scotia Sanctuary, with 2,000 individuals. Other subpopulations are expected to be uniformly < 150 individuals.		
Northern bettong	Bettongia tropica	EN	▼	800-1,600 (2025)			
Andean caenolestid	Caenolestes condorensis	VU	?	< 1,000 (2015)	Species is only known from three specimens.		
Tasman Peninsula dusky antechinus	Antechinus vandycki	EN	▼	1,000-5,000 (2025)	Best estimate for number of mature individuals is 2,000.		
Western barred bandicoot (Shark Bay bandicoot)	Perameles bougainville	VU	▲	1,000-5,000 (2025)			
Northern brush-tailed phascogale	Phascogale pirata	VU	▼	1,000-10,000 (2025)	Best estimate for number of mature individuals is 5,000.		
Leadbeater's possum	Gymnobelideus leadbeateri	CR	▼	1,100-11,000 (2016)	Best estimate for number of mature individuals is 2,500. Species habitat was heavily impacted by Black Saturday fires in 2009.		
Numbat	Myrmecobius fasciatus	NT	Steady	2,000-3,000 (2026)			
Mountain pygmy possum	Burramys parvus	CR	▼	2,250 (2008)	Mature population is sexually unbalanced, with an estimated 1,700 females and 550 males.		
Matschie's tree-kangaroo (Huon tree-kangaroo)	Dendrolagus matschiei	EN	▼	2,500 (2016)			
Western ringtail possum	Pseudocheirus occidentalis	CR	▼	3,400 (2017)	Value given is an estimate for number of mature individuals.		
Kowari	Dasyuroides byrnei	VU	▼	5,000 (2019)			
Western quoll (Chuditch)	Dasyurus geoffroii	NT	Steady	5,000-8,000 (2025)	Best estimate for number of mature individuals is 6,000. Total population is estimated to be 5,000-10,000 individuals.		
Nabarlek	Petrogale concinna	EN	▼	5,000-10,000 (2016)			
Sandhill dunnart	Sminthopsis psammophila	VU	▼	5,000-10,000 (2016)			
Scaly-tailed possum	Wyulda squamicaudata	NT	▼	5,000-10,000 (2025)			
Red-tailed phascogale	Phascogale calura	NT	▼	5,000-20,000 (2025)			
Alexandria false antechinus (Carpentarian antechinus)	Pseudantechinus mimulus	NT	▼	5,000-30,000 (2025)	Best estimate for number of mature individuals is 20,000.		
Eastern short-eared rock-wallaby	Petrogale wilkinsi	LC	▼	5,000-50,000 (2025)	Best estimate for number of mature individuals is 20,000.		
Kakadu dunnart	Sminthopsis bindi	NT	▼	5,000-50,000 (2025)	Best estimate for number of mature individuals is 15,000.		
Rufous hare-wallaby	Lagorchestes hirsutus	NT	▲	6,000 (2025)	Formerly extirpated from Australian mainland, but two reintroduced populations now exist, with one each in Western Australia and Northern Territory.		
Quokka	Setonix brachyurus	VU	▼	7,500-20,000 (2025)	Total population across mainland Australia, Rottnest Island, and Bald Island is estimated to be 12,000-21,000 individuals.		
Parma wallaby	Notamacropus parma	VU	▼	8,000 (2025)			
Black-flanked rock-wallaby (Black-footed rock-wallaby)	Petrogale lateralis	VU	▼	8,000 (2016)	Total population is estimated to be 10,000 - 12,000 individuals.		
White-footed dunnart	Sminthopsis leucopus	LC	Steady	8,000-10,000 (2020)			
Greater bilby (Bilby)	Macrotis lagotis	VU	▼	9,000 (2016)	Total population is estimated to be 9000-15,000 individuals.		
Yellow-footed rock-wallaby	Petrogale xanthopus	NT	?	< 10,000 (2016)	Total populations in South Australia and New South Wales are expected to be 6,000 and < 100 individuals, respectively.		
Godman's rock-wallaby	Petrogale godmani	NT	▼	10,000 (2016)			
Mareeba rock-wallaby	Petrogale mareeba	NT	Steady	10,000 (2016)			
Purple-necked rock-wallaby	Petrogale purpureicollis	NT	▼	10,000 (2016)	Total population is estimated to be fewer than 12,500 individuals.		
Eastern quoll	Dasyurus viverrinus	EN	▼	10,000-12,000 (2016)			
Tasmanian devil	Sarcophilus harrisii	EN	▼	10,000-25,000 (2008)	Value given is a provisional estimate for mature individuals based on estimated rates of decline.		
Lumholtz's tree-kangaroo	Dendrolagus lumholtzi	NT	?	10,000-30,000 (2016)			
Long-footed potoroo	Potorous longipes	VU	▼	10,000-50,000 (2025)			
Tammar wallaby	Notamacropus eugenii	LC	Steady	10,000-50,000 (2016)			
Western brush wallaby	Notamacropus irma	LC	Steady	10,000-50,000 (2025)			
Northern marsupial mole (Kakarratul)	Notoryctes caurinus	LC	Steady	10,000-50,000 (2016)			
Short-eared rock-wallaby (Western short-eared rock-wallaby)	Petrogale brachyotis	LC	?	10,000-50,000 (2025)	Best estimate for number of mature individuals is 20,000.		
Fawn antechinus	Antechinus bellus	VU	▼	10,000-100,000 (2016)	Best estimate for number of mature individuals is 20,000.		
Eastern barred bandicoot	Perameles gunnii	VU	▼	10,000-100,000 (2016)	Best estimate for number of mature individuals is 20,000.		
Yellow-bellied glider	Petaurus australis	VU	▼	10,000-100,000 (2025)	Values given are an estimate for number of mature individuals.		
Sandstone false antechinus (Sandstone antechinus)	Pseudantechinus bilarni	NT	▼	10,000-100,000 (2025)	Best estimate for number of mature individuals is 20,000.		
Southern brown bandicoot	Isoodon obesulus	LC	▼	10,000-100,000 (2017)			
Southern marsupial mole (Itjaritjari)	Notoryctes typhlops	LC	Steady	10,000-100,000 (2016)			
Boodie	Bettongia lesueur	NT	Steady	13,500 (2025)			
Banded hare-wallaby	Lagostrophus fasciatus	VU	▲	14,000 (2025)			
Tiger quoll (Spot-tailed quoll)	Dasyurus maculatus	NT	▼	14,000 (2018)			
Brush-tailed phascogale	Phascogale tapoatafa	NT	▼	15,000 (2020)			
Brush-tailed rock-wallaby	Petrogale penicillata	VU	▼	20,000 (2016)	Total population was estimated to be 15,000-30,000 individuals in 2008.		
Carpentarian dunnart (Butler's dunnart)	Sminthopsis butleri	VU	▼	20,000 (2019)	Population of mature individuals is "likely to be less than 2,500."		
Julia Creek dunnart	Sminthopsis douglasi	NT	▼	20,000 (2019)	Population of mature individuals is expect to be "somewhat more than 10,000" individuals.		
Eastern bettong (Tasmanian bettong)	Bettongia gaimardi	NT	?	20,000-50,000 (2016)			
Daintree River ringtail possum	Pseudochirulus cinereus	NT	▼	20,000-100,000 (2016)	Best estimate for number of mature individuals is 30,000.		
Kultarr	Antechinomys laniger	LC	▼	20,000-100,000 (2016)			
Golden bandicoot	Isoodon auratus	LC	Steady	25,000-50,000 (2025)			
Woylie	Bettongia penicillata	NT	▼	70,000-235,000 (2025)	Best estimate for number of mature individuals is 140,000.		
Long-nosed potoroo	Potorous tridactylus	NT	▼	75,000 (2020)			
Green ringtail possum	Pseudochirops archeri	NT	▼	100,000 (2019)	Value given is an estimate of total population.		
Greater glider	Petauroides volans	EN	▼	100,000–500,000 (2025)	Values represent a population estimate extrapolated from species surveys in Victoria.		
Koala	Phascolarctos cinereus	VU	▼	100,000–500,000 (2020)	Best estimate for number of mature individuals is 300,000.		
Honey possum	Tarsipes rostratus	LC	Steady	100,000-999,999 (2016)	Total population has not been quantified, but is "likely to number in the hundreds of thousands."		
Southern hairy-nosed wombat	Lasiorhinus latifrons	LC	▲	250,000–500,000 (2025)	Best estimate for number of mature individuals is 400,000.		
Common wombat (Bare-nosed womat)	Vombatus ursinus	LC	Steady	1,000,000-2,000,000 (2025)	Mainland populations are estimated to be slightly less than 1.0 million individuals.		
Wallaroo (Common wallaroo)	Osphranter robustus	LC	Steady	>2,338,076 (2021)	Population estimate is only for the areas within Australia where commercial harvesting occur. The actual national populations would be significantly higher.		
Western grey kangaroo	Macropus fuliginosus	LC	▲	>2,571,158 (2021)	Population estimate is only for the areas within Australia where commercial harvesting occur. The actual national populations would be significantly higher.		
Red kangaroo	Osphranter rufus	LC	Steady	>10,848,470 (2021)	Population estimate is only for the areas within Australia where commercial harvesting occur. The actual national populations would be significantly higher.		
Eastern grey kangaroo	Macropus giganteus	LC	Steady	>12,977,181 (2021)	Population estimate is only for the areas within Australia where commercial harvesting occur. The actual national populations would be significantly higher.		
Linnaeus's mouse opossum	Marmosa murina	LC	Steady	104,000,000 (2019)			
Gray four-eyed opossum	Philander opossum	LC	Steady	121,000,000 (2019)			
Brown four-eyed opossum	Metachirus nudicaudatus	LC	Steady	128,000,000 (2019)			
Brown-eared woolly opossum	Caluromys lanatus	LC	▼	160,000,000 (2019)			

== Species without population estimates ==
Common name	Scientific name	IUCN Red List status	Trend	Global population estimate (year)	Population notes	Range	Image
Antilopine kangaroo (Antilopine wallaroo)	Osphranter antilopinus	LC	▼	[data missing]			
Ampurta (Hillier's mulgara)	Dasycercus hillieri	LC	▲				

== See also ==
- Lists of organisms by population
- Lists of mammals by population
- Lists of elephant species by population
