= List of recently extinct mammals =

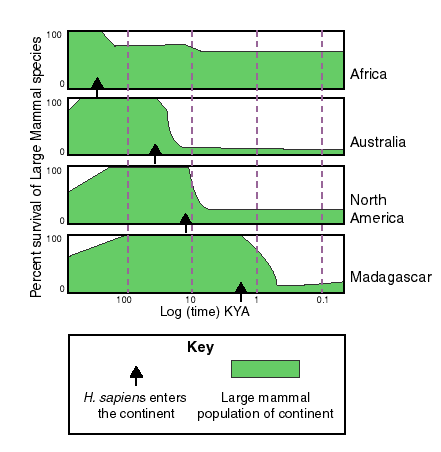
Biodiversity of large mammal species per continent before and after humans' arrival

- Extinct in the wild (EW): 1 species
- Critically endangered (CR): 236 species
- Endangered (EN): 565 species
- Vulnerable (VU): 571 species
- Near threatened (NT): 405 species
- Least concern (LC): 3,407 species
- Data deficient (DD): 789 species
Mammalian species (IUCN, 2026.1)
- 6,054 extant species have been evaluated
- 5,328 of those are fully assessed (Note: excludes data deficient evaluations.)
- 4,682 are not threatened at present (Note: NT and LC.)
- 1,372 to 2,179 are threatened (Note: Threatened comprises CR, EN and VU. Upper estimate additionally includes DD.)
- 97 to 126 are extinct or extinct in the wild:
  - 96 extinct (EX) species (Note: Chart omits extinct (EX) species)
  - 1 extinct in the wild (EW)
  - 29 possibly extinct [CR(PE)]
  - 0 possibly extinct in the wild [CR(PEW)]

Recently extinct mammals are defined by the International Union for Conservation of Nature (IUCN) as any mammals that have become extinct since the year 1500 CE. Since then, roughly 80 mammal species have become extinct.

Extinction of taxa is difficult to confirm, as a long gap without a sighting is not definitive, but before 1995 a threshold of 50 years without a sighting was used to declare extinction.

One study found that extinction from habitat loss is the hardest to detect, as this might only fragment populations to the point of concealment from humans. Some mammals declared as extinct may very well reappear. For example, a study found that 36% of purported mammalian extinction had been resolved, while the rest either had validity issues (insufficient evidence) or had been rediscovered.

As of October 2026, the IUCN listed 236 mammalian species as critically endangered, while 26% of all mammalian species were threatened with extinction.

== Conventions ==
All species listed here as extinct (no known individuals remaining) are designated by the International Union for Conservation of Nature (IUCN). Species which are extinct in the wild only reside in captivity. Species listed as possibly extinct are classified as being critically endangered, as it is unknown whether or not these species are extinct. Extinct subspecies such as the Javan tiger (Panthera tigris sondaica) are not listed here as the species, in this case Panthera tigris, is still extant. The IUCN Redlist classification for each species serves as a citation, and the superscripted "IUCN" by the date is a link to that species' page. A range map is provided where available, and a description of their former or current range is given if a range map is not available.

== Causes of extinction ==
Anthropogenic (human caused) habitat degradation is the main cause of species extinctions now. The main cause of habitat degradation worldwide is agriculture, with urban sprawl, logging, mining and some fishing practices close behind. The physical destruction of a habitat, both directly (deforestation for land development or lumber) and indirectly (burning fossil fuels), is an example of this.

Also, increasing toxicity, through media such as pesticides, can kill off a species very rapidly, by killing all living members through contamination or sterilizing them. Persistent organic pollutants (POPs), for example, can bioaccumulate to hazardous levels, getting increasingly dangerous further up the food chain.

Disease can also be a factor: white nose syndrome in bats, for example, is causing a substantial decline in their populations and may even lead to the extinction of some species.

Overhunting also has an impact. Terrestrial mammals, such as the tiger and deer, are mainly hunted for their pelts and in some cases meat, and marine mammals can be hunted for their oil and leather. Specific targeting of one species can be problematic to the ecosystem because the sudden demise of one species can inadvertently lead to the demise of another (coextinction) especially if the targeted species is a keystone species. Sea otters, for example, were hunted in the maritime fur trade, and their drop in population led to the rise in sea urchins—their main food source—which decreased the population of kelp—the sea urchin's and Steller's sea cow's main food source—leading to the extinction of the Steller's sea cow. The hunting of an already limited species can easily lead to its extinction, as with the bluebuck whose range was confined to 1,700 square miles (4,400 km^{2}) and which was hunted into extinction soon after discovery by European settlers.

== Australia ==
Island creatures are usually endemic to only that island, and that limited range and small population can leave them vulnerable to sudden changes. While Australia is a continent and not an island, due to its geographical isolation, its unique fauna has suffered an extreme decline in mammal species, 10% of its 273 terrestrial mammals, since European settlement (a loss of one to two species per decade). Furthermore, 21% of Australia's mammals are threatened, and unlike in most other continents, the main cause is predation by feral species, such as cats.

== Extinct species ==
A species is declared extinct after exhaustive surveys of all potential habitats eliminate all reasonable doubt that the last individual of a species, whether in the wild or in captivity, has died. Recently extinct species are defined by the IUCN as becoming extinct after 1500 CE.

Common name	Binomial name	Order	Date of extinction	Former range	Picture
Broad-faced potoroo	Potorous platyops Gould, 1844	Diprotodontia	1875 1	Australia	
Eastern hare wallaby	Lagorchestes leporides Gould, 1841	Diprotodontia	1889 1	Australia	
Lake Mackay hare-wallaby	Lagorchestes asomatus Finlayson, 1943	Diprotodontia	1932 1	Australia	
Desert rat-kangaroo	Caloprymnus campestris Gould, 1843	Diprotodontia	1935 1	Australia	
Thylacine or Tasmanian wolf/tiger	Thylacinus cynocephalus Harris, 1808	Dasyuromorphia	1936 1	Australia, Tasmania	
Toolache wallaby	Macropus greyi Waterhouse, 1846	Diprotodontia	1939 1	Australia	
Desert bandicoot	Perameles eremiana Spencer, 1837	Peramelemorphia	1943 1	Australia	
New South Wales barred bandicoot	Perameles fasciata Gray, 1841	Peramelemorphia	mid-19th century	Australia	
Southwestern barred bandicoot	Perameles myosuros Wagner, 1841	Peramelemorphia	mid-19th century	Australia	
Southern barred bandicoot	Perameles notina Thomas, 1922	Peramelemorphia	mid-19th century	Australia	
Nullarbor barred bandicoot	Perameles papillon Travouillon & Phillips, 2018	Peramelemorphia	early 20th century	Australia	
Lesser bilby or yallara	Macrotis leucura Thomas, 1887	Peramelemorphia	1960s 1	Australia	
Southern pig-footed bandicoot	Chaeropus ecaudatus Ogilby, 1838	Peramelemorphia	1950s 1	Australia	
Northern pig-footed bandicoot	Chaeropus yirratji Travouillon et al., 2019	Peramelemorphia	1950s		
Crescent nail-tail wallaby	Onychogalea lunata Gould, 1841	Diprotodontia	1956 1	Australia (western and central)	
Red-bellied gracile opossum or red-bellied gracile mouse opossum	Cryptonanus ignitus Díaz, Flores and Barquez, 2002	Didelphimorphia	1962 1	Argentina	
Desert bettong	Bettongia anhydra Finlayson, 1957	Diprotodontia	1950s or 1960s 1	Australia	
Nullarbor dwarf bettong	Bettongia pusilla McNamara, 1997	Diprotodontia	early 1500s 1	Australia (Nullarbor Plain)	
Steller's sea cow	Hydrodamalis gigas von Zimmermann, 1780	Sirenia	1768 1	Commander Islands (Russia, United States)	
Bramble Cay melomys	Melomys rubicola Thomas, 1924	Rodentia	2016 1	Australia (Bramble Cay)	
Oriente cave rat	Boromys offella Miller, 1916	Rodentia	early 1500s 1	Cuba	
Torre's cave rat	Boromys torrei Allen, 1917	Rodentia	early 1500s 1	Cuba	
Imposter hutia	Hexolobodon phenax Miller, 1929	Rodentia	early 1500s 1	Hispaniola (currently Haiti and the Dominican Republic)	
Montane hutia	Isolobodon montanus Miller, 1922	Rodentia	early 1500s 1	Hispaniola	
Dwarf viscacha	Lagostomus crassus Thomas, 1910	Rodentia	early 1900s 1	Peru	
Galápagos giant rat	Megaoryzomys curioi Niethammer, 1964	Rodentia	1500s 1	Santa Cruz Island (Galápagos)	
Cuban coney	Geocapromys columbianus Chapman, 1892	Rodentia	early 1500s 1	Cuba	
Hispaniolan edible rat	Brotomys voratus Miller, 1916	Rodentia	1536–1546 1	Hispaniola	
Puerto Rican hutia	Isolobodon portoricensis Allen, 1916	Rodentia	early 1900s 1	Hispaniola; introduced to Puerto Rico, Saint Thomas Island, Saint Croix, U.S. Virgin Islands and Mona Island	
Big-eared hopping mouse	Notomys macrotis Thomas, 1921	Rodentia	1843 1	Australia (central Western Australia)	
Darling Downs hopping mouse	Notomys mordax Thomas, 1921	Rodentia	1846 1	Australia (Darling Downs, Queensland)	
White-footed rabbit-rat	Conilurus albipes Lichtenstein, 1829	Rodentia	early 1860s 1	Australia (eastern coast)	
Capricorn rabbit rat	Conilurus capricornensis Cramb and Hocknull, 2010	Rodentia	early 1500s 1	Australia (Queensland)	
Short-tailed hopping mouse	Notomys amplus Brazenor, 1936	Rodentia	1896 1	Australia (Great Sandy Desert)	
Long-tailed hopping mouse	Notomys longicaudatus Gould, 1844	Rodentia	1901 1	Australia	
Great hopping mouse	Notomys robustus Mahoney, Smith and Medlin, 2008	Rodentia	mid-1800s 1	Australia (Flinders Ranges and Davenport Ranges)	
Desmarest's pilorie or Martinique giant rice rat	Megalomys desmarestii Fischer, 1829	Rodentia	1902 1	Martinique	
Saint Lucia pilorie or Saint Lucia giant rice rat	Megalomys luciae Major, 1901	Rodentia	1881 1	Saint Lucia	
Bulldog rat	Rattus nativitatis Thomas, 1888	Rodentia	1903 1	Christmas Island	
Maclear's rat	Rattus macleari Thomas, 1887	Rodentia	1903 1	Christmas Island	
Darwin's Galápagos mouse	Nesoryzomys darwini Osgood, 1929	Rodentia	1930 1	Galápagos Islands	
Plains rat or palyoora	Pseudomys auritus Thomas, 1910	Rodentia	early 1800s 1	Australia (Kangaroo Island and the Younghusband Peninsula)	
Pemberton's deer mouse	Peromyscus pembertoni Burt, 1932	Rodentia	1931 1	San Pedro Nolasco Island, Mexico	
Samaná hutia	Plagiodontia ipnaeum Johnson, 1948	Rodentia	early 1500s (Note: A 1985 study suggested they may have survived into the 1900s based on local legends of the "comadreja") 1	Hispaniola	
Hispaniola monkey	Antillothrix bernensis MacPhee, Horovitz, Arredondo, & Jimenez Vasquez, 1995	Primates	early 16th century	Hispaniola (currently Dominican Republic)	
Jamaican monkey	Xenothrix mcgregori Williams & Koopman, 1952	Primates	1707-1725 1	Jamaica	
Lesser stick-nest rat or white-tipped stick-nest rat	Leporillus apicalis John Gould, 1854	Rodentia	1933 1	Australia (west-central)	
Indefatigable Galápagos mouse	Nesoryzomys indefessus Thomas, 1899	Rodentia	1934 1	Galápagos Islands	
Little Swan Island hutia	Geocapromys thoracatus True, 1888	Rodentia	1955 1	Swan Islands, Honduras	
Blue-gray mouse	Pseudomys glaucus Thomas, 1910	Rodentia	1956 1	Australia (Queensland, New South Wales)	
Buhler's coryphomys or Buhler's rat	Coryphomys buehleri Schaub, 1937	Rodentia	early 1500s 1	West Timor, Indonesia	
Insular cave rat	Heteropsomys insulans Anthony, 1916	Rodentia	early 1500s 1	Vieques Island, Puerto Rico	
Candango mouse	Juscelinomys candango Moojen, 1965	Rodentia	1960 1	Central Brazil	
Anthony's woodrat	Neotoma anthonyi Allen, 1898	Rodentia	1926 1	Isla Todos Santos, Mexico	
Bunker's woodrat	Neotoma bunkeri Burt, 1932	Rodentia	1931 1	Coronado Islands, Mexico	
Vespucci's rodent	Noronhomys vespuccii Carleton and Olson, 1999	Rodentia	1500 1	Fernando de Noronha, Brazil	
St. Vincent colilargo or St. Vincent pygmy rice rat	Oligoryzomys victus Thomas, 1898	Rodentia	1892 1	Saint Vincent	
Jamaican rice rat	Oryzomys antillarum Thomas, 1898	Rodentia	1877 1	Jamaica	
Nelson's rice rat	Oryzomys nelsoni Merriam, 1889	Rodentia	1897 1	Islas Marías, Mexico	
Nevis rice rat, St. Eustatius rice rat, or St. Kitts rice rat	Pennatomys nivalis Turvey, Weksler, Morris & Nokkert, 2010	Rodentia	early 1500s (Note: There were reports of unusual rats on Nevis being eaten by islanders in the 1930s.) 1	Sint Eustatius and Saint Kitts and Nevis	
Christmas Island pipistrelle	Pipistrellus murrayi Andrews, 1900	Chiroptera	2009 1	Christmas Island	
Sturdee's pipistrelle	Pipistrellus sturdeei Thomas, 1915	Chiroptera	1889 1	Bonin Islands	
Sardinian pika	Prolagus sardus Wagner, 1832	Lagomorpha	1774 1	Corsica and Sardinia	
Marcano's solenodon	Solenodon marcanoi Patterson, 1962	Eulipotyphla	1500s 1	Dominican Republic	
Puerto Rican nesophontes	Nesophontes edithae Anthony, 1916	Eulipotyphla	early 1500s 1	Puerto Rico, Vieques Island, Saint John, U.S. Virgin Islands and Saint Thomas, U.S. Virgin Islands	
Atalaye nesophontes	Nesophontes hypomicrus Miller, 1929	Eulipotyphla	early 1500s 1	Hispaniola	
Greater Cuban nesophontes	Nesophontes major Arredondo, 1970	Eulipotyphla	early 1500s 1	Cuba	
Western Cuban nesophontes	Nesophontes micrus Allen, 1917	Eulipotyphla	early 1500s 1	Cuba (including Isla de la Juventud)	
St. Michel nesophontes	Nesophontes paramicrus Miller, 1929	Eulipotyphla	early 1500s 1	Hispaniola	
Haitian nesophontes	Nesophontes zamicrus Miller, 1929	Eulipotyphla	early 1500s 1	Haiti	
Small Samoan flying fox	Pteropus allenorum Helgen & Wilson, 2009	Chiroptera	1856 1	Samoa	
Large Samoan flying fox	Pteropus coxi Helgen & Wilson, 2009	Chiroptera	1839–1841 1	Samoa	
Lesser Mascarene flying fox or dark flying fox	Pteropus subniger kerr, 1792	Chiroptera	1864 1	Réunion, Mauritius	
Guam flying fox or Guam fruit bat	Pteropus tokudae Tate, 1934	Chiroptera	1968 1	Guam	
Dusky flying fox or Percy Island flying fox	Pteropus brunneus Dobson, 1878	Chiroptera	1870 1	Percy Islands (Australia)	
Large Palau flying fox	Pteropus pilosus Andersen, 1908	Chiroptera	1874 1	Palau	
Large sloth lemur	Palaeopropithecus ingens Grandidier, 1899	Primates	1620 1	In green	
Aurochs	Bos primigenius Bojanus, 1827	Artiodactyla	1627 1		
Bluebuck	Hippotragus leucophaeus Pallas, 1766	Artiodactyla	1800 1		
Red gazelle	Eudorcas rufina Thomas, 1894	Artiodactyla	late 1800s 1	Algeria	
Indo-Chinese warty pig	Sus bucculentus Heude, 1892	Artiodactyla	1892 1	Vietnam	
Schomburgk's deer	Rucervus schomburgki Blyth, 1863	Artiodactyla	1932 1	Thailand	
Queen of Sheba's gazelle or Yemen gazelle	Gazella bilkis Grover and Lay, 1985	Artiodactyla	1951 1	Yemen	
Saudi gazelle	Gazella saudiya Carruthers & Schwarz, 1935	Artiodactyla	1970	Arabian Peninsula	
Lemerle's dwarf hippopotamus	Hippopotamus lemerlei Milne-Edwards, 1868	Artiodactyla	early 1500s (Note: Although, ^{14}C dating points their extinction at 1000 C. E., a 1991 study found they coexisted with humans and survived into the 1500s.) 1	Madagascar	
Falkland Islands wolf or warrah	Dusicyon australis Kerr, 1792	Carnivora	1876 1	Falkland Islands	
Dusicyon avus	Dusicyon avus Burmeister, 1866	Carnivora	early 1500s 1	Argentina, Chile, Brazil, Uruguay, Paraguay	
Sea mink	Neogale macrodon Prentiss, 1903	Carnivora	1894 1	United States (Maine, Massachusetts) and Canada (New Brunswick, Newfoundland)	
Japanese sea lion	Zalophus japonicus Peters, 1866	Carnivora	1970s 1	Japan, Korea, Russia	
Caribbean monk seal	Neomonachus tropicalis Gray, 1850	Carnivora	1952 1	Caribbean Sea	
Giant fossa	Cryptoprocta spelea Grandidier, 1902	Carnivora	before 1658 1		
Lord Howe long-eared bat	Nyctophilus howensis McKean, 1975	Chiroptera	prior to 1972 1	Lord Howe Island, Australia	
Japanese otter	Lutra nippon Imaizumi & Yoshiyuki, 1989	Carnivora	1990s	Japan	
Christmas Island shrew	Crocidura trichura Dobson, 1889	Eulipotyphla	1985 1		

== Extinct subspecies ==
Common name	Binomial name	Species	Order	Date of extinction	Former range	Picture
Texas red wolf	Canis rufus rufus Audubon and Bachman, 1951	Red wolf (Canis rufus)	Carnivora	1970	North America	
Caucasian wisent	Bison bonasus caucasicus Turkin and Satunin, 1904	European bison (Bison bonasus)	Artiodactyla	1927	Europe	
Carpathian wisent	Bison bonasus hungarorum Kretzoi, 1946	European bison (Bison bonasus)	Artiodactyla	1852	Europe	
Quagga	Equus quagga quagga Boddaert, 1785	Plains zebra (Equus quagga)	Perissodactyla	1883	Africa	
Japanese wolf	Canis lupus hodophilax Temminick 1839	Grey wolf (Canis lupus)	Carnivora	1905	Asia	
Hokkaido wolf	Canis lupus hattai Kishida, 1931	Grey wolf (Canis lupus)	Carnivora	1889	Asia	
Atlas bear	Ursus arctos crowtheri Schinz, 1844	Brown bear (Ursus arctos)	Carnivora	1890	Africa	
Bali tiger	Panthera tigris sondaica Shwarz,1912	Tiger (Panthera tigris)	Carnivora	1950s	Asia	
Caspian tiger	Panthera tigris tigris Illiger, 1815	Tiger (Panthera tigris)	Carnivora	1970s	Asia	
Javan tiger	Panthera tigris sondaica Temminick, 1844	Tiger (Panthera tigris)	Carnivora	1980s	Asia	
Bubal hartebeest	Alcelaphus buselaphus buselaphus Pallas 1766	Hartebeest (Alcephalus buselaphus)	Artiodactyla	1925	Africa	
Portuguese ibex	Capra pyrenaica lusitanica Schlegel, 1872	Iberian ibex (Capra pyrenaica)	Artiodactyla	1892	Europe	
Pyrenean ibex	Capra pyrenaica pyreneica Schinz, 1838	Iberian ibex (Capra pyrenaica)	Artiodactyla	2000, 2003	Europe	
Western black rhinoceros	Diceros bicornis longipes Zukowsky, 1999	Black rhinoceros (Diceros bicornis)	Artiodactyla	2011	Africa	
Cape lion	Panthera leo melanochaita Smith, 1842	Lion (Panthera leo)	Carnivora	mid 19th century	Africa	
Barbary lion	Panthera leo leo Linnaeus, 1758	Lion (Panthera leo)	Carnivora	1960s	Africa	
Southern Rocky Mountain wolf	Canis lupus youngi Goldman, 1937	Grey wolf (Canis lupus)	Carnivora	1935	North America	
Kenai Peninsula wolf	Canis lupus alces Goldman, 1941	Grey wolf (Canis lupus)	Carnivora	1925	North America	
Banks Island wolf	Canis lupus bernardi Anderson, 1943	Grey wolf (Canis lupus)	Carnivora	1952	North America	
Newfoundland wolf	Canis lupus beothucus Allen & Barbour, 1937	Grey wolf (Canis lupus)	Carnivora	1911	North America	
Florida black wolf	Canis rufus floridanus Miller, 1912	Red wolf (Canis rufus)	Carnivora	1934	North America	
Cascade Mountains wolf	Canis lupus fuscus Richardson, 1839	Grey wolf (Canis lupus)	Carnivora	1944	North America	
Mogollon mountain wolf	Canis lupus mogollonensis Goldman, 1937	Grey wolf (Canis lupus)	Carnivora	1970s	North America	
Texas gray wolf	Canis lupus monstrabilis Goldman, 1937	Grey wolf (Canis lupus)	Carnivora	19th century	North America	
Sicilian wolf	Canis lupus cristaldii Angelici and Rossi, 2018	Grey wolf (Canis lupus)	Carnivora	1924	Europe	
Mexican grizzly bear	Ursus arctos nelsoni Merriam, 1914	Brown bear (Ursus arctos)	Carnivora	1965	North America	
California grizzly bear	Ursus arctos californicus Merriam, 1896	Brown bear (Ursus arctos)	Carnivora	1924	North America	
Tarpan	Equus ferus ferus Boddaert, 1785	Wild horse (Equus ferus)	Perissodactyla	1909	Europe	

== Extinct in the wild ==
A species that is extinct in the wild is one which has been categorized by the International Union for Conservation of Nature (IUCN) as only known by living members kept in captivity or as a naturalized population outside its historic range due to massive habitat loss. A species is declared extinct in the wild after thorough surveys have inspected its historic range and failed to find evidence of a surviving individual.

Common name	Binomial name	Order	Date of extinction	Former range	Picture
Père David's deer	Elaphurus davidianus Milne-Edwards, 1866	Artiodactyla	1939 1	China	

== Possibly extinct ==
Extinction of taxa is difficult to detect, as a long gap without a sighting is not definitive. Some mammals declared as extinct may very well reappear. For example, a study found that 36% of purported mammalian extinction had been resolved, while the rest either had validity issues (insufficient evidence) or had been rediscovered. As of December 2015, the IUCN listed 30 mammalian species as "critically endangered (possibly extinct)".

Common name	Binomial name	Order	Last confirmed sighting	Range	Picture
Kouprey or forest ox	Bos sauveli Urbain, 1937	Artiodactyla	1988 1		
Garrido's hutia	Capromys garridoi Varona, 1970	Rodentia	1989 1	Cayo Maja, Cuba	
Wimmer's shrew	Crocidura wimmeri de Balsac and Aellen, 1958	Eulipotyphla	1976 1		
Baiji or Yangtze river dolphin	Lipotes vexillifer Miller, 1918	Artiodactyla	2002 (Note: The species may be functionally extinct.) 1		
Zuniga's dark rice rat	Melanomys zunigae Sanborn	Rodentia	1949 1	Peru	
Dwarf hutia	Mesocapromys nanus Allen, 1917	Rodentia	1937 1		
San Felipe hutia or little earth hutia	Mesocapromys sanfelipensis Varona & Garrido, 1970	Rodentia	1978 1	Cuba	
One-striped opossum	Monodelphis unistriata Wagner, 1842	Didelphimorphia	1899 1		
Gloomy tube-nosed bat	Murina tenebrosa Yoshiyuki, 1970	Chiroptera	1962 1	Tsushima Island and possibly Yaku Island, Japan	
New Zealand greater short-tailed bat	Mystacina robusta Dwyer, 1962	Chiroptera	1967 1	Taukihepa / Big South Cape Island, New Zealand	
Ethiopian amphibious rat or Ethiopian water mouse	Nilopegamys plumbeus Osgood, 1928	Rodentia	1920s 1	Mouth of the Lesser Abay River, Ethiopia	
Angel Island mouse	Peromyscus guardia Townsend, 1912	Rodentia	1991 1	Isla Ángel de la Guarda, Mexico	
Puebla deer mouse	Peromyscus mekisturus Merriam, 1898	Rodentia	1950s 1	Ciudad Serdan and Tehuacán, Mexico	
Telefomin cuscus	Phalanger matanim Flannery, 1987	Diprotodontia	1997 1		
Montane monkey-faced bat	Pteralopex pulchra Flannery, 1991	Chiroptera	1990s 1		
Aru flying fox	Pteropus aruensis Peter, 1867	Chiroptera	1877 1		
Emma's giant rat	Uromys emmae Groves and Flannery, 1994	Rodentia	1990s 1	Papua Province, Indonesia	
Emperor rat	Uromys imperator Thomas, 1888	Rodentia	1888 1	Guadalcanal, Solomon Islands	
Guadalcanal rat	Uromys porculus Thomas, 1904	Rodentia	1888 1	Guadalcanal, Solomon Islands	
Malabar large-spotted civet or Malabar civet	Viverra civettina Blyth, 1862	Carnivora	before 1990 (Note: The last confirmed sighting is unknown and their range in the wild is unconfirmed. Camera traps in Karnataka, their presumed habitat, found no individuals after 1,084 nights in 2006.) 1		
Miss Waldron's Red Colobus	Piliocolobus waldronae Hayman, 1936	Primata	1997 1		

== See also ==
- Holocene extinction
- List of extinct animals
- List of extinct birds
- Lists of mammals by population
