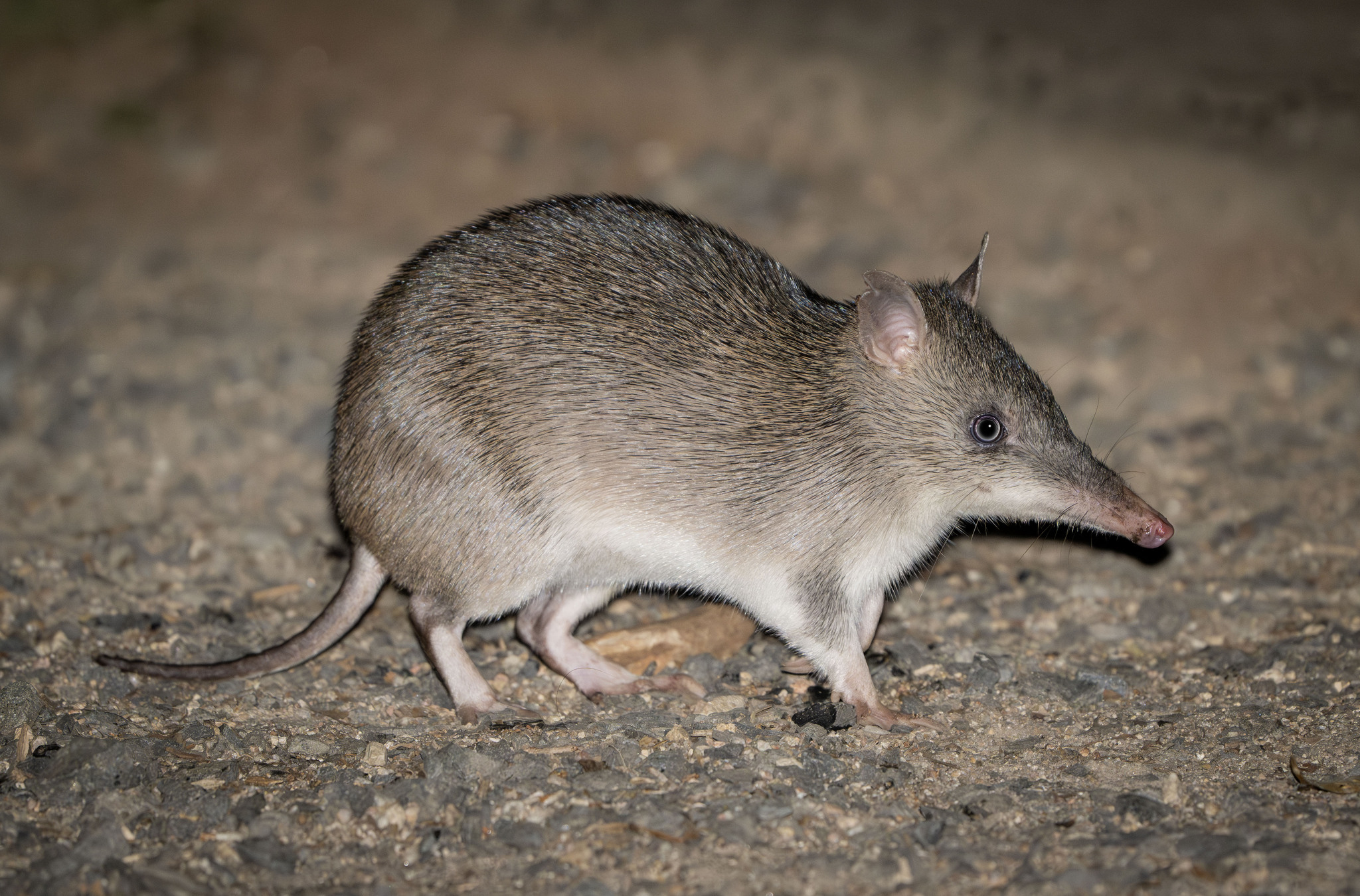

Conservation status
- Least Concern (NCA)

Scientific classification
- Kingdom: Animalia
- Phylum: Chordata
- Class: Mammalia
- Infraclass: Marsupialia
- Order: Peramelemorphia
- Family: Peramelidae
- Genus: Perameles
- Species: P. pallescens

Binomial name
- Perameles pallescens Thomas, 1923

Synonyms
- Perameles nasuta pallescens Thomas, 1923

= Northern long-nosed bandicoot =

Species of mammal

The northern long-nosed bandicoot (Perameles pallescens), also known as the Queensland barred bandicoot, is a species of bandicoot endemic to North Queensland.

== Habitat and distribution ==
It is found in wet sclerophyll forest and rainforest in the Wet Tropics, occurring from Iron Range in the north to Paluma in the south.

== Conservation ==
It is listed as Least Concern by the Queensland Government under the Nature Conservation Act 1992.
