= Perameles wilkinsonorum =

Perameles wilkinsonorum Temporal range: Pliocene

Scientific classification
- Kingdom: Animalia
- Phylum: Chordata
- Class: Mammalia
- Infraclass: Marsupialia
- Order: Peramelemorphia
- Family: Peramelidae
- Genus: Perameles
- Species: †P. wilkinsonorum

Binomial name
- †Perameles wilkinsonorum Travouillon et al., 2017

Perameles wilkinsonorum is an extinct species of maursupial in the genus Perameles that lived during the Pliocene epoch.

== Distribution ==
Perameles wilkinsonorum is known from the Chinchilla Local Fauna of Queensland.
