= Perameles bowensis =

Perameles bowensis Temporal range: Pliocene

Scientific classification
- Kingdom: Animalia
- Phylum: Chordata
- Class: Mammalia
- Infraclass: Marsupialia
- Order: Peramelemorphia
- Family: Peramelidae
- Genus: Perameles
- Species: P. bowensis

Binomial name
- Perameles bowensis Muirhead, Dawson, and Archer 1997

Extinct species of marsupial

Perameles bowensis is an extinct Pliocene-aged species of bandicoot. Fossils have been found in the Wellington Caves of New South Wales. The bandicoot was about 20 centimeters long. It is believed to have gone extinct in the Late Pliocene.

It is probably most closely related to P. sobbei, a Pleistocene-aged bandicoot from Queensland.
