= Perameles allinghamensis =

Perameles allinghamensis Temporal range: Early Pliocene

Scientific classification
- Kingdom: Animalia
- Phylum: Chordata
- Class: Mammalia
- Infraclass: Marsupialia
- Order: Peramelemorphia
- Family: Peramelidae
- Genus: Perameles
- Species: P. allinghamensis

Binomial name
- Perameles allinghamensis Archer and Wade, 1976

Extinct species of marsupial

Perameles allinghamensis, the Bluff Downs bandicoot, is a small extinct bandicoot that lived in Australia 4 million years ago in the Pliocene period. It was discovered at the Bluff Downs fossil site in northern Queensland. Its diet probably consisted of insects and soft roots dug for with its front claws.
