= Bulungu =

Bulungu may refer to:

- Bulungu, Kasai-Central, a town in Kasai-Central province of the southern Democratic Republic of the Congo.
- Bulungu, Kwilu, a community in the Kwilu province, Democratic Republic of the Congo
- Bulungu (mammal), a genus of extinct marsupials
