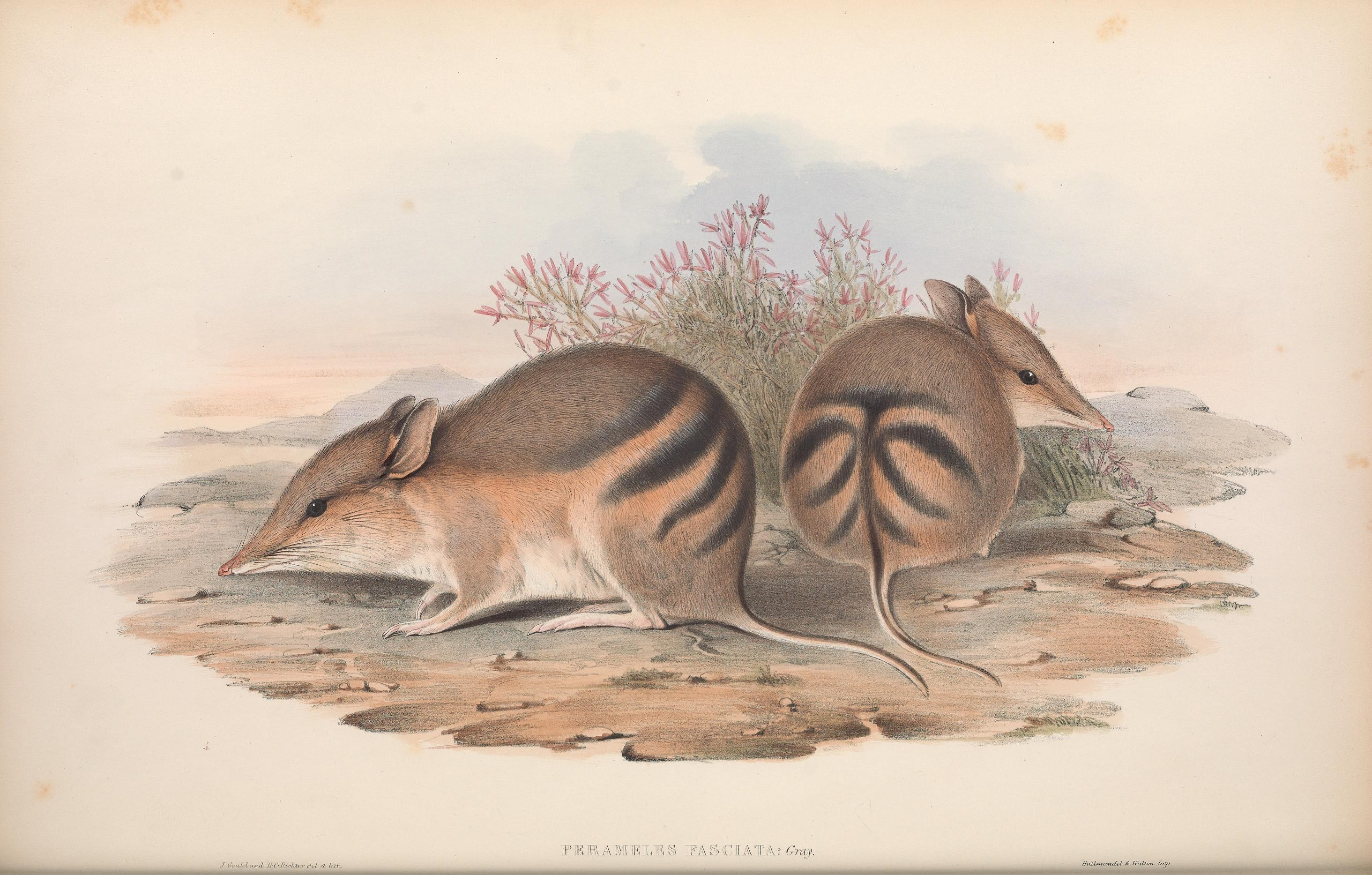

Conservation status
- Extinct (IUCN 3.1)

Scientific classification
- Kingdom: Animalia
- Phylum: Chordata
- Class: Mammalia
- Infraclass: Marsupialia
- Order: Peramelemorphia
- Family: Peramelidae
- Genus: Perameles
- Species: †P. fasciata

Binomial name
- †Perameles fasciata Gray, 1841

Synonyms
- Perameles sobbei Price, 2002

= Liverpool Plains striped bandicoot =

Species of mammal

The Liverpool Plains striped bandicoot (Perameles fasciata), also known as the New South Wales barred bandicoot, is an extinct species of bandicoot formerly found in what is now the Liverpool Plains agricultural region of north-central New South Wales.

== Conservation ==
It has been assessed as extinct by the IUCN as well as by the Australian and New South Wales governments.
