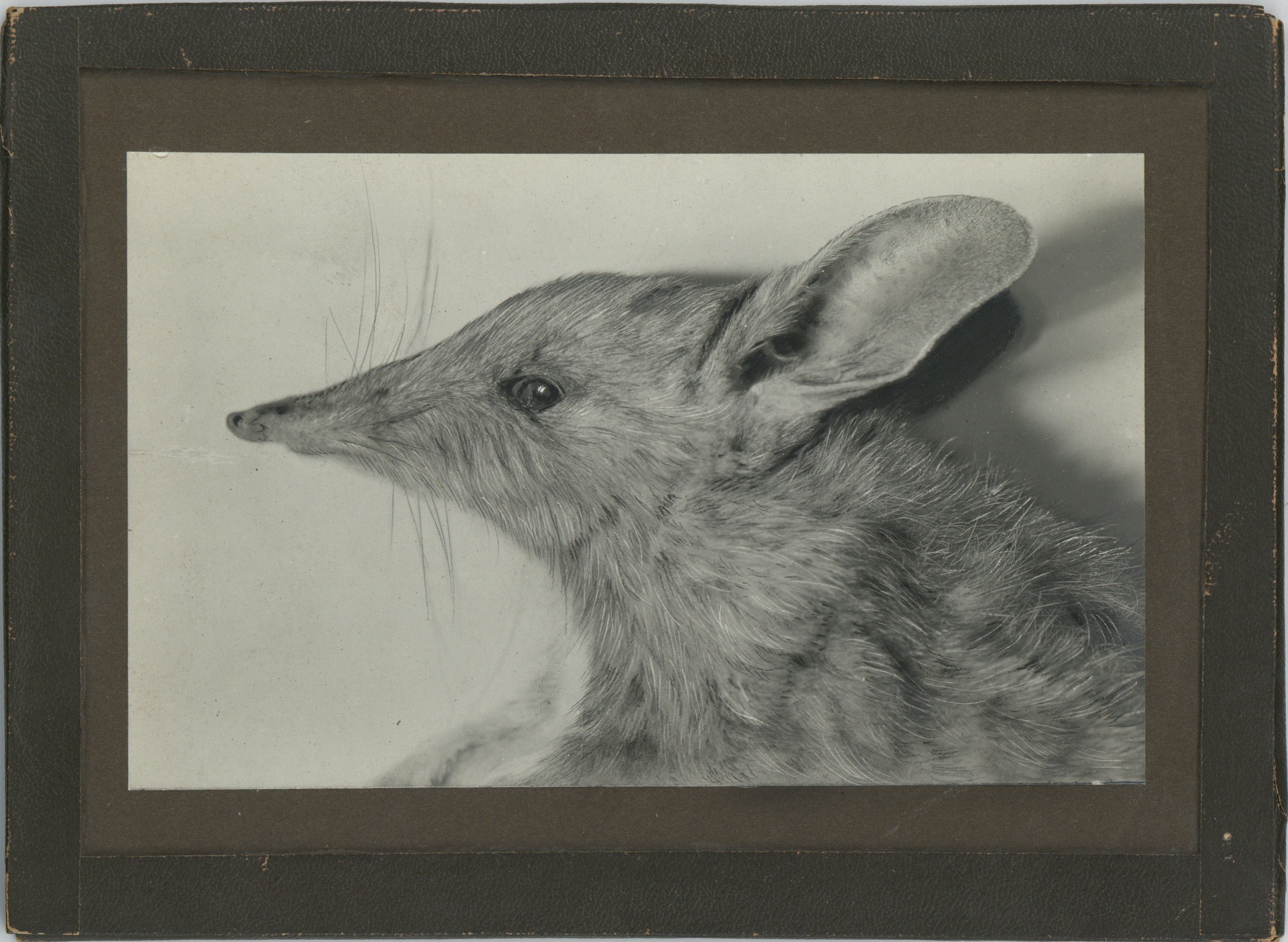
- Mounted photograph of a Nullarbor barred bandicoot (Perameles papillon) produced by Frederic Wood Jones, 1924-1926.

Conservation status
- Extinct (IUCN 3.1)

Scientific classification
- Kingdom: Animalia
- Phylum: Chordata
- Class: Mammalia
- Infraclass: Marsupialia
- Order: Peramelemorphia
- Family: Peramelidae
- Genus: Perameles
- Species: †P. papillon

Binomial name
- †Perameles papillon Travouillon & Phillips, 2018

= Perameles papillon =

Extinct species of bandicoot

The Nullarbor barred bandicoot (Perameles papillon) is an extinct species of bandicoot that was native to the arid Nullarbor Plain in southern Australia. It is also called the butterfly bandicoot for the dark brown patch on its rump, which resembles a butterfly. It was described in 2018 based on existing skins and osteological material within museum collections in Australia.

The Nullarbor barred bandicoot was last collected in 1928. Suspected causes of its extinction include predation by non-native feral cats and foxes, habitat degradation due to non-native rabbits and livestock, and changes in the fire regime.
