= Perameles myosuros =

Conservation status
- Extinct (IUCN 3.1)

Scientific classification
- Kingdom: Animalia
- Phylum: Chordata
- Class: Mammalia
- Infraclass: Marsupialia
- Order: Peramelemorphia
- Family: Peramelidae
- Genus: Perameles
- Species: †P. myosuros

Binomial name
- †Perameles myosuros Wagner, 1841

Extinct species of bandicoot

Perameles myosuros, the south-western barred bandicoot or marl, is a recently extinct species of bandicoot that was native to the southern parts of Western Australia. Initially described in 1841 it was later made a subspecies of the extant Perameles bougainville before being restored to species level in 2018, based on museum specimens. Of particular note was that the females were significantly larger than the males in P. myosuros, which is an unusual trait amongst mammals, whereas the sexes were the same size in P. bougainville.

It is unclear when P. myosuros became extinct due to the poor data collection and confusion between the different species of Perameles, however the last specimen was collected in 1906, and it has been suggested it went extinct around 1910. Probable causes for extinction include predation by feral cats and foxes, and habitat loss and fragmentation.
