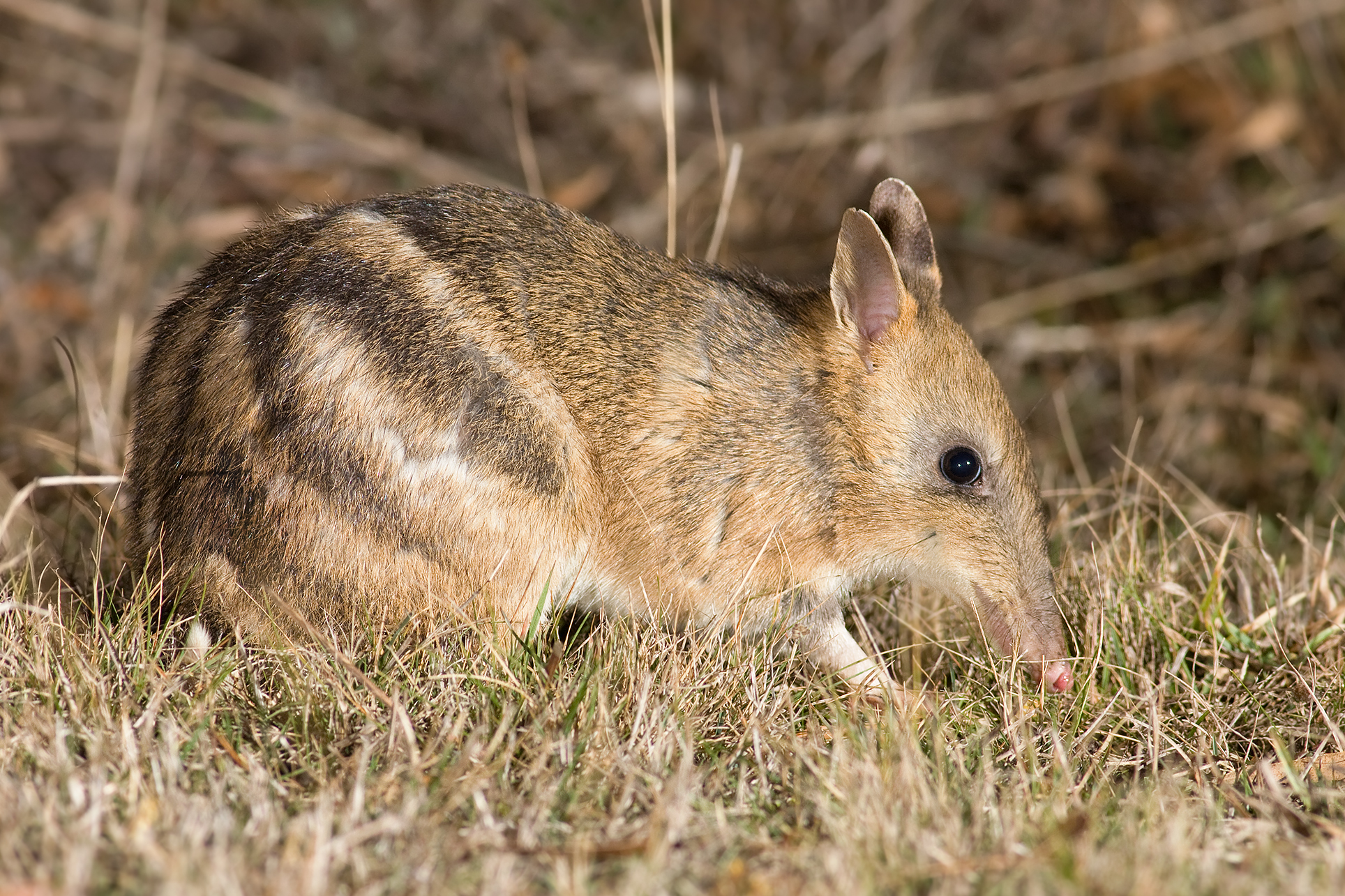
- An eastern barred bandicoot

Scientific classification
- Kingdom: Animalia
- Phylum: Chordata
- Class: Mammalia
- Infraclass: Marsupialia
- Order: Peramelemorphia
- Family: Peramelidae; Gray, 1825

Type genus
- Perameles Geoffroy, 1804

Subfamilies and genera
- Peramelinae: Isoodon; Perameles; Crash†; Peroryctinae: Peroryctes; Echymiperinae: Echymipera; Microperoryctes; Rhynchomeles
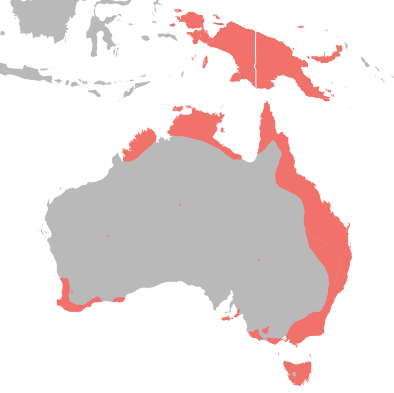
- Peramelidae distribution

= Peramelidae =

Peramelidae Temporal range: Miocene - Recent

Family of marsupials

The marsupial family Peramelidae contains the extant bandicoots. They are found throughout Australia and New Guinea, with at least some species living in every available habitat, from rainforest to desert. Four fossil peramelids are described. One known extinct species of bandicoot, the pig-footed bandicoot, was so different from the other species, it was recently moved into its own family.

== Characteristics ==
Peramelids are small marsupials, ranging in size from the mouse bandicoot, which is 15–17.5 cm long, to the giant bandicoot, which at 39–56 cm in length and up 4.7 kg in weight, is about the size of a rabbit. They have short limbs and tails, smallish, mouse-like ears, and a long, pointed snout.

Peramelids are omnivorous, with soil-dwelling invertebrates forming the major part of their diet; they also eat seeds, fruit, and fungi. Their teeth are correspondingly unspecialised, with most species having the dental formula 5.1.3.43.1.3.4

Female peramelids have a pouch that opens to the rear and contains eight teats. The maximum litter size is, therefore, eight, since marsupial young are attached to the teat during development, although two to four young per litter is a more typical number. The gestation period of peramelids is the shortest among mammals, at just 12.5 days, the young are weaned around two months of age, and reach sexual maturity at just three months. This allows a given female to produce more than one litter per breeding season and gives peramelids an unusually high reproductive rate compared with other marsupials.

== Classification ==
Upham et al. 2019

- Peramelidae
  - Rhynchomeles
  - - - Peramelinae
        - Isoodon
        - Perameles
    - - Peroryctinae
        Peroryctes
      - Echymiperinae
        - Echymipera
        - Microperoryctes

Álvarez-Carretero et al. 2022

- Peramelidae
  - - Peramelinae
      - Isoodon
      - Perameles
  - - Peroryctinae
      Peroryctes
    - Echymiperinae
      - Echymipera [incl. Rhynchomeles]
      - Microperoryctes

The listing for peramelid species is based on the Mammal Diversity Database and the Australian Faunal Directory for extant species, as well as The Paleobiology Database for extinct species.

- Family Peramelidae
  - Subfamily Peramelinae
    - Genus Crash†
      - Crash bandicoot† (fossil)
    - Genus Isoodon: short-nosed bandicoots
      - Golden bandicoot, Isoodon auratus
      - Quenda, Isoodon fusciventer
      - Northern brown bandicoot, Isoodon macrourus
      - Southern brown bandicoot, Isoodon obesulus
      - Cape York brown bandicoot, Isoodon peninsulae
    - Genus Perameles: long-nosed or barred bandicoots
      - Western barred bandicoot, Perameles bougainville
      - Desert bandicoot, Perameles eremiana† (extinct)
      - New South Wales barred bandicoot, Perameles fasciata† (extinct)
      - Eastern barred bandicoot, Perameles gunnii
      - Southwestern barred bandicoot, Perameles myosuros† (extinct)
      - Long-nosed bandicoot, Perameles nasuta
      - Southern barred bandicoot, Perameles notina† (extinct)
      - Queensland barred bandicoot, Perameles pallescens
      - Ooldea barred bandicoot, Perameles papillon)† (extinct)
      - Perameles allinghamensis† (fossil)
      - Perameles bowensis† (fossil)
      - Perameles sobbei† (fossil)
  - Subfamily Peroryctinae
    - Genus Peroryctes: New Guinean long-nosed bandicoots
      - Giant bandicoot, Peroryctes broadbenti
      - Raffray's bandicoot, Peroryctes raffrayana
      - cf. Peroryctes tedfordi† (fossil)
      - cf. Peroryctes sp.† (fossil)
  - Subfamily Echymiperinae
    - Genus Echymipera: New Guinean spiny bandicoots
      - Long-nosed spiny bandicoot, Echymipera rufescens
      - Clara's spiny bandicoot, Echymipera clara
      - Menzies' spiny bandicoot, Echymipera echinista
      - Common spiny bandicoot, Echymipera kalubu
      - David's spiny bandicoot, Echymipera davidi
    - Genus Microperoryctes: New Guinean mouse bandicoots
      - Mouse bandicoot, Microperoryctes murina
      - Western striped bandicoot, Microperoryctes longicauda
      - Arfak pygmy bandicoot, Microperoryctes aplini
      - Papuan bandicoot, Microperoryctes papuensis
    - Genus Rhynchomeles
      - Seram bandicoot, Rhynchomeles prattorum

== See also ==
- List of mammal genera
- List of recently extinct mammals
- List of prehistoric mammals
