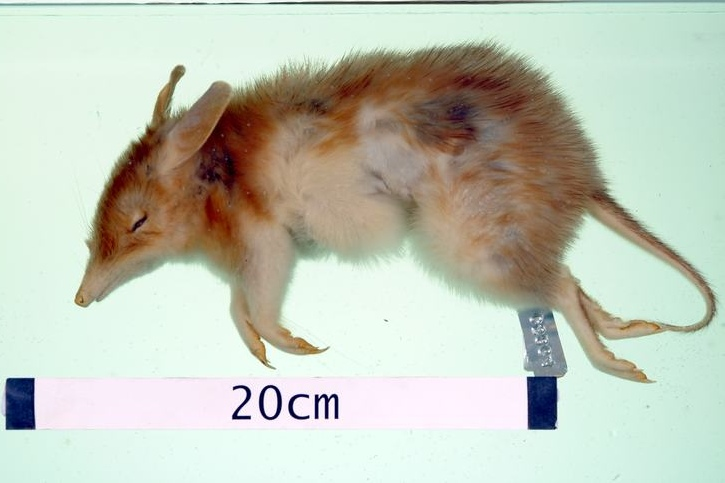
- Taxidermied specimen

Conservation status
- Extinct (IUCN 3.1)

Scientific classification
- Kingdom: Animalia
- Phylum: Chordata
- Class: Mammalia
- Infraclass: Marsupialia
- Order: Peramelemorphia
- Family: Peramelidae
- Genus: Perameles
- Species: †P. eremiana

Binomial name
- †Perameles eremiana Spencer, 1897

= Desert bandicoot =

Extinct species of marsupial

The desert bandicoot (Perameles eremiana) is an extinct bandicoot of the arid country in the centre of Australia.

== Taxonomy ==
The description by Walter Baldwin Spencer was published in 1897, using a specimen provided by a European correspondent, Mr. Gillen, who had settled at Alice Springs. The holotype was placed at the National Museum in Melbourne. The type location was determined as the Burt Plain, an area north of Alice in South Australia.

The status as species is uncertain: it was proposed by L. Freedman in 1967 to represent a clinal form of a P. bougainville population, yet recognised in a revision of Perameles phylogeny in 2012. Names of the species by indigenous peoples of the central desert were reported by Spencer as mulgaruquirra at Alice Springs and iwurra at Charlotte Waters. Common names for the species also include orange-backed bandicoot and waliya, the latter adopted from a traditional name at the Warburton region.

== Description ==
A species of Perameles which, like the Isoodon of the bandicoot family Peramelidae, are terrestrial and somewhat quadrupedal foragers that use short forelimbs to excavate the ground. The hind limbs resemble the macropods, roos and wallabies, and the syndactyly that is typical of diprotodonts, the combined second and third toes of the hindfeet. The body is small and head that is proportionally long, narrow and pointed to suit its use in investigating the sand while digging. Like other peramelids, the pelage of Perameles eremiana is composed of coarse and stiff hair, the coloration of this species is a dull orange with darker bands over the rump. They most closely resemble the western barred bandicoot Perameles bougainville, most readily distinguished by a rufous-orange coloration at the flanks, face and rump. dark brown fur covered most of the upper and lower parts of the feet at the front and hind limbs. The tails of Perameles are comparatively short, but in this species it was relatively longer, measuring 77–135 millimetres, and fur at the upper-side was dark brown; the end of the tail tapers to a point.

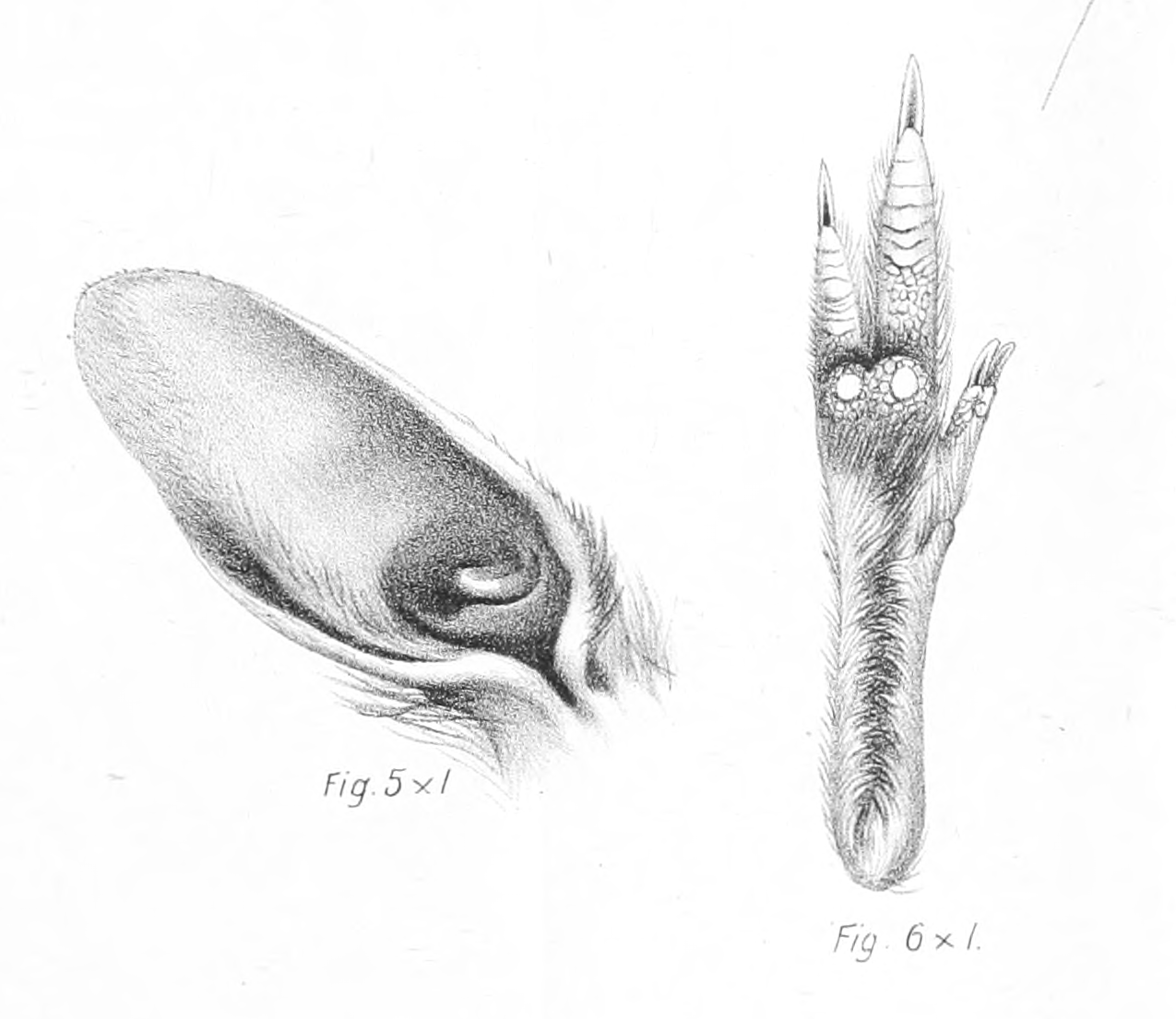
detail of illustration by Baldwin Spencer, depicting the ear and foot

The range of measurements for specimens of P. eremiana are 180 to 285 mm for head and body length combined, and their weight is estimated to be around 205 grams. Like other peramelids, the females have a rear facing pouch and possessed eight teats, the number of young may also have been as many as four although the only reports are of a female bearing two young. The distinctive characters of P. eremiana, the coloration, hair on the lower surface of the foot and longer pointed ears are thought to be adaptations suited to its arid environment of central Australian deserts. Its diet is not known with certainty, but has been reported to include ants, beetle larvae, and termites.

== Distribution and habitat ==
The last known specimen was collected in 1943 on the Canning Stock Route in Western Australia, and the species is presumed to be extinct. Their first specimens, from the Alice Springs area, were described in 1897. It appears to have been common in the remote north-west of South Australia, the south-west of the Northern Territory, and the central part of Western Australia at least until the 1930s. Unconfirmed reports suggest that its range may have extended to the Tanami Desert and the arid Western Australian coast between Broome and Port Hedland.

Favoured habitat was sandy desert dominated by spinifex vegetation, Triodia species and other tussock grasses, on dunes or sand-plains. It appears to have disappeared between about 1943 and 1960. While the cause of its decline remains uncertain, it is thought to be related to the changed burning regimes that followed the removal of Aboriginal people from the central Australian deserts. Another factor may have been the introduction of the red fox in Australia. The species succumbed to the variety of threatening factors associated with the collapse of mammal populations in Western Australia (1875–1925). A study that modelled its decline when attributed to an epizootic event, an unknown disease that was reported at the time, found that Perameles eremiana would have had no immunity to its impact.

The detailed habits of the species are unknown, but assumed to be similar to the extant western barred bandicoot. They were found in areas also inhabited by the golden bandicoot Isoodon auratus.

A simple burrow was lined with sticks and leaves, scraped or dug at the ground beneath a shrub or spinifex tussock, and this provided refuge while it rested during the day. Foraging activity was nocturnal, and like other bandicoots, left a conical hole as it dug and investigated an area with its claws and long snout. This bandicoot was eaten by indigenous peoples, who captured the animal by blocking the entrance of its nest with one foot and removing the trapped animal by hand.
