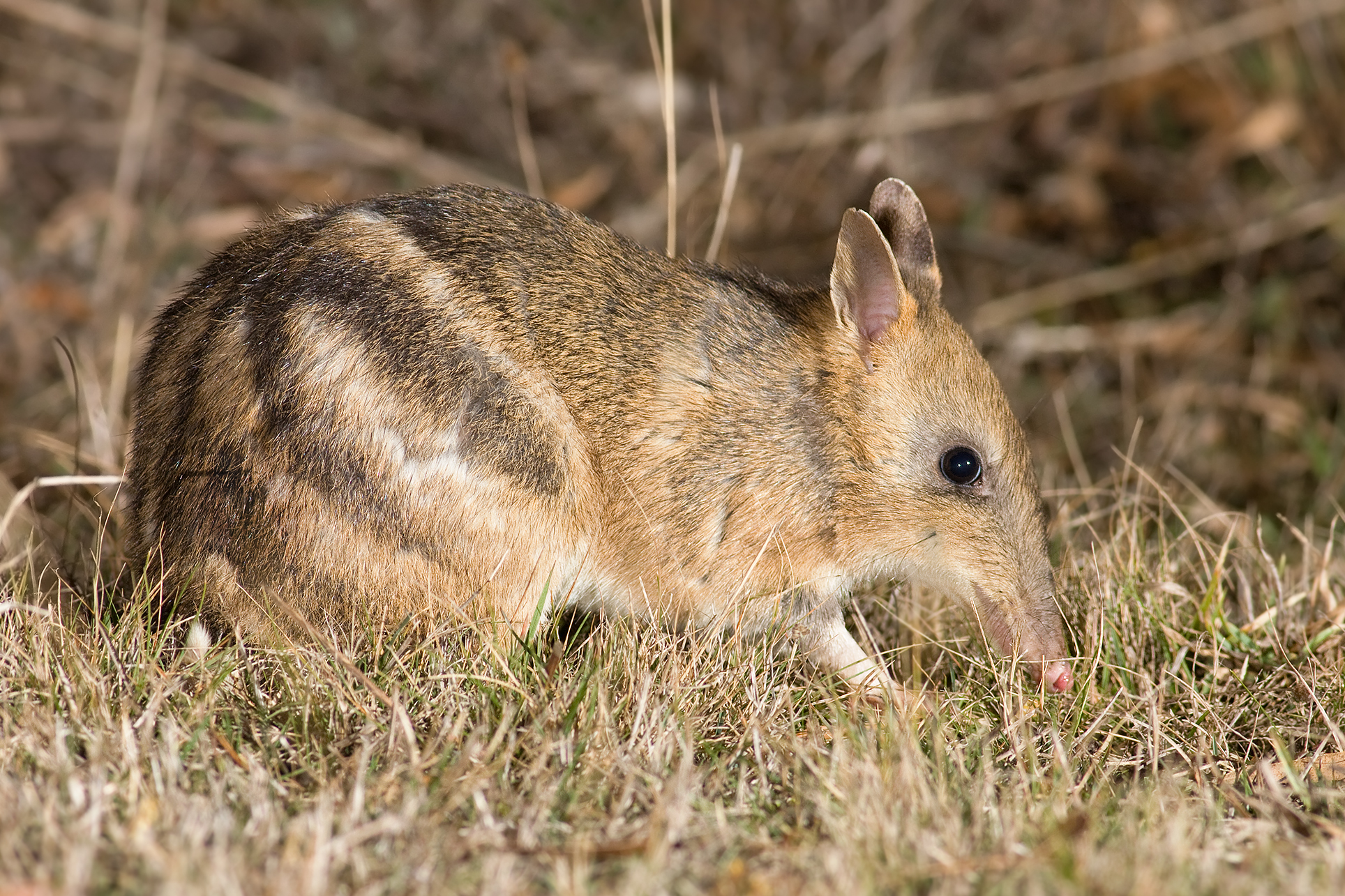

Conservation status
- Vulnerable (IUCN 3.1)

Scientific classification
- Kingdom: Animalia
- Phylum: Chordata
- Class: Mammalia
- Infraclass: Marsupialia
- Order: Peramelemorphia
- Family: Peramelidae
- Genus: Perameles
- Species: P. gunnii

Binomial name
- Perameles gunnii J. E. Gray, 1838
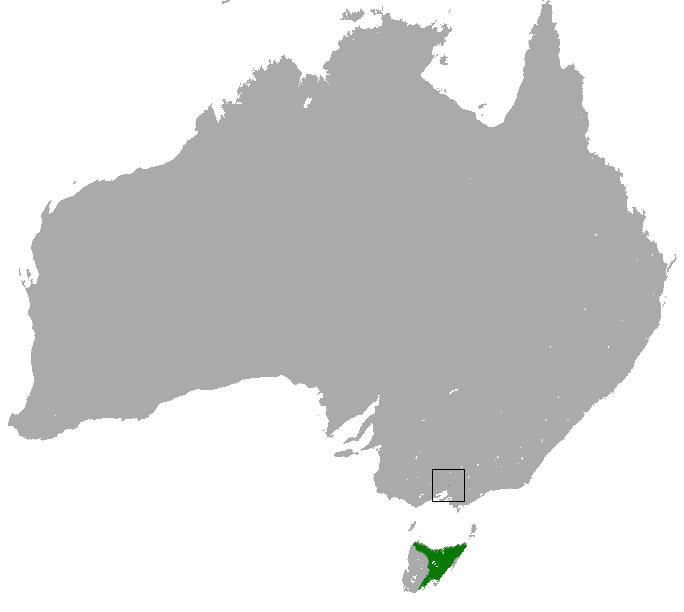
- Eastern barred bandicoot range (green — native, pink — reintroduced as native population is extinct)

= Eastern barred bandicoot =

Species of mammal

The eastern barred bandicoot (Perameles gunnii) is a nocturnal, rabbit-sized marsupial endemic to southeastern Australia, being native to the island of Tasmania and mainland Victoria. It is one of the four surviving bandicoot species in the genus Perameles. It is distinguishable from its partially-sympatric congener—the long-nosed bandicoot – via three or four dark horizontal bars found on its rump. In Tasmania, it is relatively abundant. The mainland population in Victoria is struggling and is subject to ongoing conservation endeavors.

== Description ==
The eastern barred bandicoot weighs less than 2 kg (4.4 lb) and has a short tail and three to four whitish bars across the rump. The eastern barred bandicoot has two separated populations, one on the mainland of Australia and one on the island of Tasmania. The Tasmanian form is somewhat larger than the mainland form as the average adult mass is 750 g (26 oz) in Victoria and 1,000 g (35 oz) in Tasmania. It lives for just two to three years and is not gregarious. Males occupy large home ranges compared to females and only consort with females for mating.

This species is nocturnal. It emerges from its nest at dusk to forage for a variety of invertebrates including crickets, beetles and earthworms. During the day it rests in a grass-lined nest. When foraging, it uses its long nose to probe deep into the soil and then digs eagerly when it locates food. Females have 8 nipples and can produce a maximum of 5 young in one litter with an average of 2 to 3 young. Gestation lasts just 12 days—this is one of the shortest gestation periods of any mammal. Young are weaned at 55 days, and emergent juveniles remain dependent upon their mothers and forage with them until day 86. Given ideal conditions, females can have up to five litters per year although reproduction becomes depressed in summer and ceases altogether in times of drought.

== Distribution and conservation status ==
The eastern barred bandicoot was once distributed across the basalt plains of southwest Victoria, and in Tasmania. Due to predation by introduced foxes and cats, along with land-clearing for farming practices, the Victorian subspecies is critically endangered. Since 1989, eight reintroduction sites have been established across the bandicoot's former range. The conservation of eastern barred bandicoots in Victoria now depends upon the success of captive breeding and reintroduction programs. Keys to this conservation plan include maintaining an insurance population in captivity, conducting research to improve breeding and reintroduction success and increasing community awareness and support for this rare marsupial.

A management plan created in 1987 and updated in 1989 proposed the first reintroduction of the eastern barred bandicoot in Victoria at Woodlands Historic Park, located about 20 km northwest of Melbourne.

In 1988, animals from the last remaining free-ranging mainland population in Hamilton, western Victoria, were moved to captive breeding facilities at Woodlands in order to establish a new population. The offspring bred in captivity later became the foundation for reintroductions into the park’s nature reserve, known as the Back Paddock, a 400-hectare area protected by a predator-resistant fence designed to exclude feral predators.

Populations at four sites are now extinct (Floating Islands Nature Reserve, Lanark, Cobra Killuc Wildlife Reserve and Lake Goldsmith Nature Reserve), functionally extinct at Woodlands Historic park, declining at Mooramong and increasing at Hamilton Community Parklands and Mount Rothwell. The last remaining wild population, which was once found along the Grange Burn (a creek) in Hamilton, has also been declared extinct. The estimated population size for the Victorian eastern barred bandicoot in 2008 was 150 individuals.

Eastern barred bandicoots have been successfully released on Phillip Island, French Island and Churchill Island in Victoria's Westernport.

On 15 September 2021, Victoria's Environment Minister Lily D'Ambrosio announced that the conservation status of the Victorian species has changed from "extinct in the wild" to "endangered", as its population had jumped from 150 to 1,500 over the course of thirteen years. This was the first time in Australia's history that such a change in conservation status had been made.

The Tasmanian subspecies (P. g. gunni) is vulnerable to extinction. This species is more widespread than its mainland cousin because Tasmania provides large areas of suitable habitat and because the island lacks the bandicoot's main predator, the red fox.

== Recovery efforts ==
In the state of Victoria, a recovery team oversees actions aimed at conserving the Victorian subspecies. Representatives of government agencies, NGOs and private conservation groups collaborate to develop and implement actions to improve the species' outlook. Groups include Conservation Volunteers, Zoos Victoria, Parks Victoria, Mount Rothwell Biodiversity Interpretation Centre, University of Melbourne, Conservation Enterprises Unlimited, and the National Trust of Australia (Victoria).

An effective recovery tactic currently in use is the exclusion of invasive predators from populations of threatened eastern barred bandicoots through the extensive use of conservation fences. Non-native predator species that are fenced out from endangered populations include feral cats and red foxes. Another important feature of conservation fences is that they restrict the spread of infectious diseases among the few remaining animals.

== Phylogeny ==
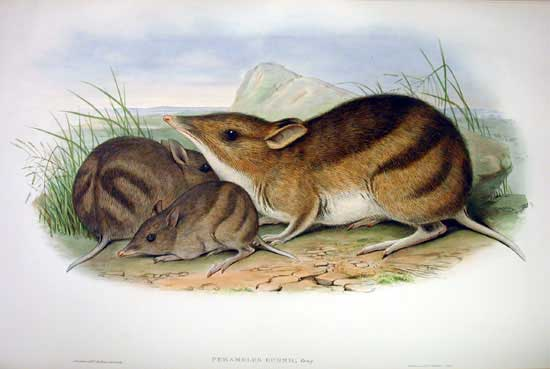
Illustration from Mammals of Australia, 1863

The eastern barred bandicoot is most closely related to the other species of bandicoot in its genus, of which only two species are still extant today. These surviving relatives are the western barred bandicoot (Perameles bougainville) and the long-nosed bandicoot (Perameles nasuta). It is also closely related to the desert bandicoot of the same genus, but this species has become extinct. There are about 20 other bandicoots in the same family, Peramelidae. They share similar features of long pointed snouts, and small ears. The bandicoots are closely related to the bilbies, which share the same order, Peramelemorphia. These are all from the infraclass Marsupialia, shared of course with other species such as koalas and kangaroos, which means they diverged from placental mammals about 100 million years ago.

== In popular culture ==
The species is the basis for the popular videogame character Crash Bandicoot, and was selected from a number of Tasmanian mammals by creators Andy Gavin and Jason Rubin for its appeal and relative obscurity.
