= Bulungu (mammal) =

Bulungu Temporal range: Oligocene - Miocene

Scientific classification
- Kingdom: Animalia
- Phylum: Chordata
- Class: Mammalia
- Infraclass: Marsupialia
- Order: Peramelemorphia
- Superfamily: †Yaraloidea
- Genus: †Bulungu; Gurovichet al., 2013

Type species
- Bulungu palara

Species
- B. campbelli Travouillon et al., 2013; B. minkinaensis Travouillon, Beck & Case, 2021; B. muirheadae Travouillon et al., 2013; B. palara Gurovich et al., 2013; B. pinpaensis Travouillon, Beck & Case, 2021

Genus of marsupials

Bulungu is an extinct genus of bandicoot-like mammal from Oligo-Miocene deposits of Riversleigh, northwestern Queensland, and the Etadunna Formation, Australia. It was first named by Gurovich et al. (2013) and the type species is Bulungu palara. Two additional species, Bulungu campbelli and Bulungu minkinaensis, were also described in 2013. Bulungu muirheadae is the oldest fossil bandicoot recovered to date. An additional three species Bulungu minkinaensis, Bulungu pinpaensis, and Bulungu westermani were named by Travouillon, Beck & Case (2021) allowing for placement of the genus in the superfamily Yaraloidea.
