= Galadi =

Galadi Temporal range: Oligocene - Miocene

Scientific classification
- Kingdom: Animalia
- Phylum: Chordata
- Class: Mammalia
- Infraclass: Marsupialia
- Order: Peramelemorphia
- Genus: †Galadi; Travouillon et al., 2010

Species
- G. speciosus Travouillon et al., 2010 (type); G. adversus Travouillon et al., 2013; G. amplus Travouillon et al., 2013; G. grandis Travouillon et al., 2013

Extinct genus of marsupials

Galadi is an extinct genus of predatory bandicoot from Oligo-Miocene deposits of Riversleigh, northwestern Queensland, Australia. It was first named by K.J. Travouillon, Y. Gurovich, R.M.D. Beck and J. Muirhead in 2010 and the type species is Galadi speciosus; additional three species, G. adversus, G. amplus and G. grandis, were described in 2013. The genus is represented by three well-preserved skulls and several isolated maxillae and dentaries. Its body mass would have been close to two pounds, making it relatively large for its family. The combination of body size, robustness and short, stout skull indicates that Galadi would have been able to take relatively large prey for its size, though the morphology of its molars indicates it may have been omnivorous.
