= Yarala =

Yarala Temporal range: Late Oligocene–Early Miocene

Scientific classification
- Kingdom: Animalia
- Phylum: Chordata
- Class: Mammalia
- Infraclass: Marsupialia
- Order: Peramelemorphia
- Family: †Yaralidae; Muirhead, 2000
- Genus: †Yarala; Muirhead & Filan, 1995

Type species
- †Yarala burchfieldi Muirhead & Filan, 1995

Other species
- †Y. kida Schwartz, 2006

Extinct genus of marsupials

Yarala is a genus of fossil mammals that resemble contemporary bandicoots. The superfamily Yaraloidea and family Yaralidae were created following the discovery of the type species Yarala burchfieldi in 1995, on the basis that it lacks synapomorphies that unite all other peramelemorphian taxa.

A second species was described in 2006, which is suggested to be ancestral to Y. burchfieldi.
