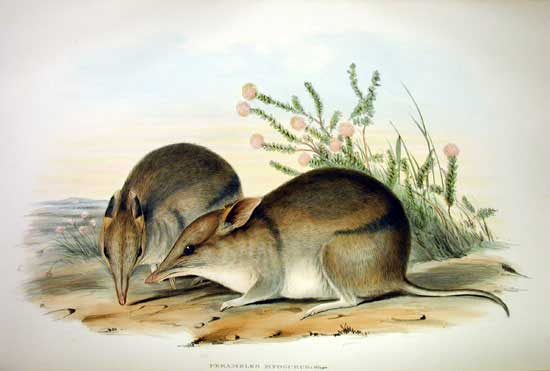
- Perameles myosuros

Scientific classification
- Kingdom: Animalia
- Phylum: Chordata
- Class: Mammalia
- Infraclass: Marsupialia
- Order: Peramelemorphia
- Family: Peramelidae
- Subfamily: Peramelinae
- Genus: Perameles; É. Geoffroy, 1804

Type species
- Perameles nasuta É. Geoffroy, 1804

Species
- Perameles bougainville; †Perameles eremiana; †Perameles fasciata; Perameles gunnii; †Perameles myosuros; †Perameles notina; Perameles nasuta; Perameles pallescens; †Perameles papillon

= Perameles =

Perameles Temporal range: Pleistocene - Recent

Genus of marsupials

Perameles is a genus of marsupials of the order Peramelemorphia. They are referred to as long-nosed bandicoots or barred bandicoots.

The genus name Perameles comes from Ancient Greek πήρα (pḗra), meaning ("pouch, bag"), and Latin mēlēs, meaning "marten, badger".

More than half the known recent species of Perameles have been driven to extinction, although these extinct species were long considered conspecific with P. bougainville, a 2018 study determined them to be distinct species.

The extant species are:

- Western barred bandicoot (P. bougainville)
- Eastern barred bandicoot (P. gunnii)
- Long-nosed bandicoot (P. nasuta)
- Queensland barred bandicoot (P. pallescens)

The recently extinct species are:

- †Desert bandicoot (P. eremiana)
- †New South Wales barred bandicoot (P. fasciata)
- †Southwestern barred bandicoot (P. myosuros)
- †Southern barred bandicoot (P. notina)
- †Nullarbor barred bandicoot (P. papillon)

Fossil species are:

- †P. allinghamensis
- †P. bowensis
- †P. sobbei
- †P. wilkinsonorum
