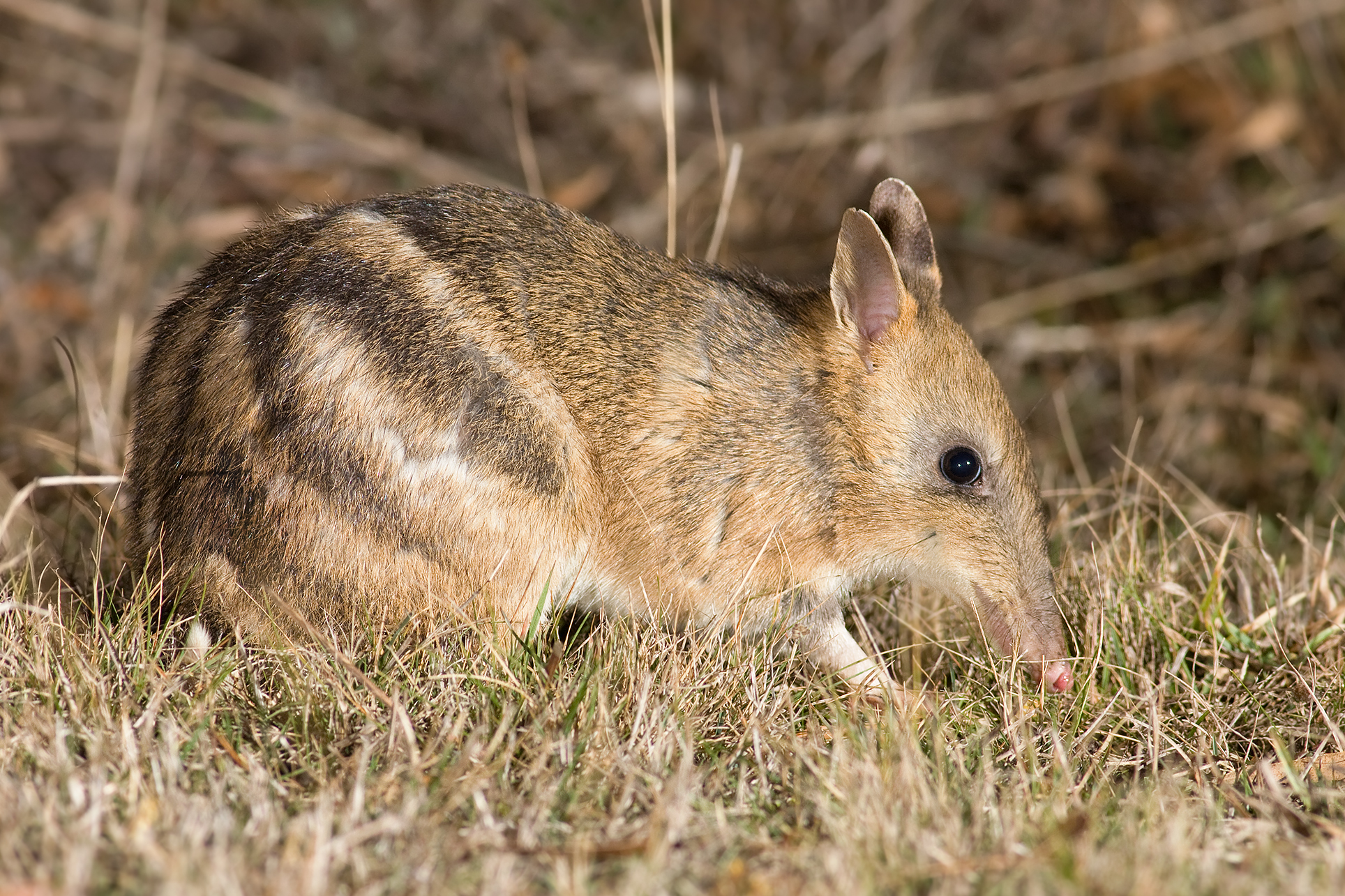
- Eastern barred bandicoot (Perameles gunni)

Scientific classification
- Kingdom: Animalia
- Phylum: Chordata
- Class: Mammalia
- Infraclass: Marsupialia
- Clade: Agreodontia
- Order: Peramelemorphia

Superfamilies, etc.
- See text.

= Bandicoot =

Bandicoots Temporal range: Late Oligocene – Recent

Marsupial endemic to the Australia–New Guinea region

Bandicoots are a group of more than 20 species of small to medium-sized, largely nocturnal, omnivorous marsupials in the order Peramelemorphia. They are endemic to the Australia–New Guinea region, including the Bismarck Archipelago to the east and Seram and Halmahera to the west.

== Etymology ==
The bandicoots are members of the order Peramelemorphia and the word bandicoot is often used informally to refer to any peramelemorph, such as the bilby. The term originally referred to the unrelated Indian bandicoot rat from the Telugu word pandikokku (పందికొక్కు), wherein pandi means pig and kokku means rat.

== Characteristics ==
Bandicoots have V-shaped faces, ending in a prominent nose. These noses make them similar in appearance to elephant shrews and extinct leptictids. The long snout and sharp claws enable them to dig.

Like most marsupials, male bandicoots have bifurcated penises.

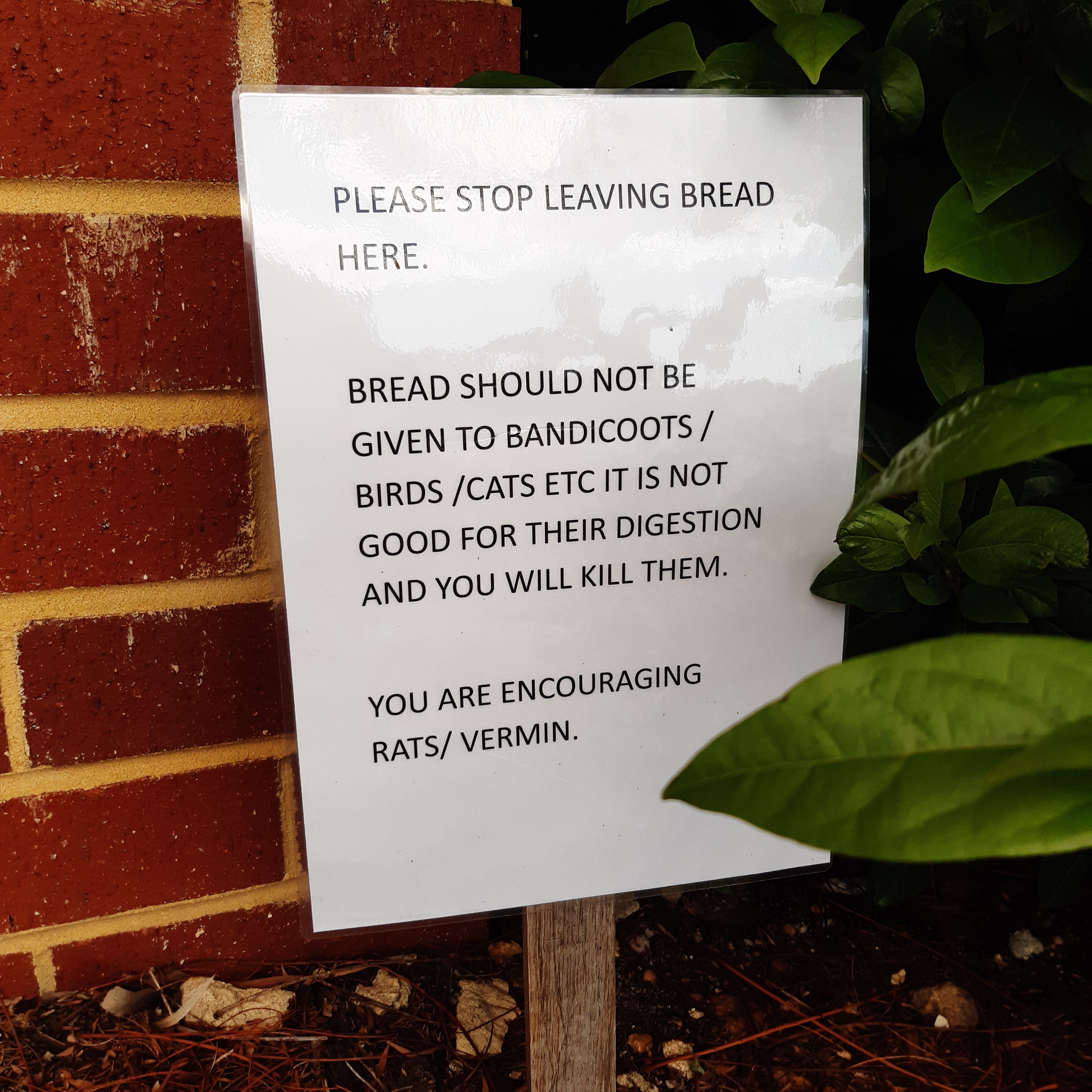
A sign near Armadale shopping city, Perth, Australia, asking members of the public not to leave bread for bandicoots and other animals

The embryos of bandicoots have a chorioallantoic placenta that connects them to the uterine wall, in addition to the choriovitelline placenta common to all marsupials. However the chorioallantoic placenta is small compared with those of the Placentalia and lacks chorionic villi.

Bandicoots can reach 11 to 31 in (28 to 79 cm) in length and 0.4 to 3.5 lb (0.18 to 1.6 kg) in weight. A bandicoot has a long pointed snout, large ears, a short body and a long tail. Its body is covered with fur that can be brown, black, golden, white or grey. Bandicoots have strong hind legs well adapted for jumping.

Bandicoots also have low body temperatures and low basal metabolic rates, which aids their survival in hot and dry climates. They also have a low total water evaporative rate and effective panting mechanisms, which further aid their survival in hotter temperatures.

== Classification ==
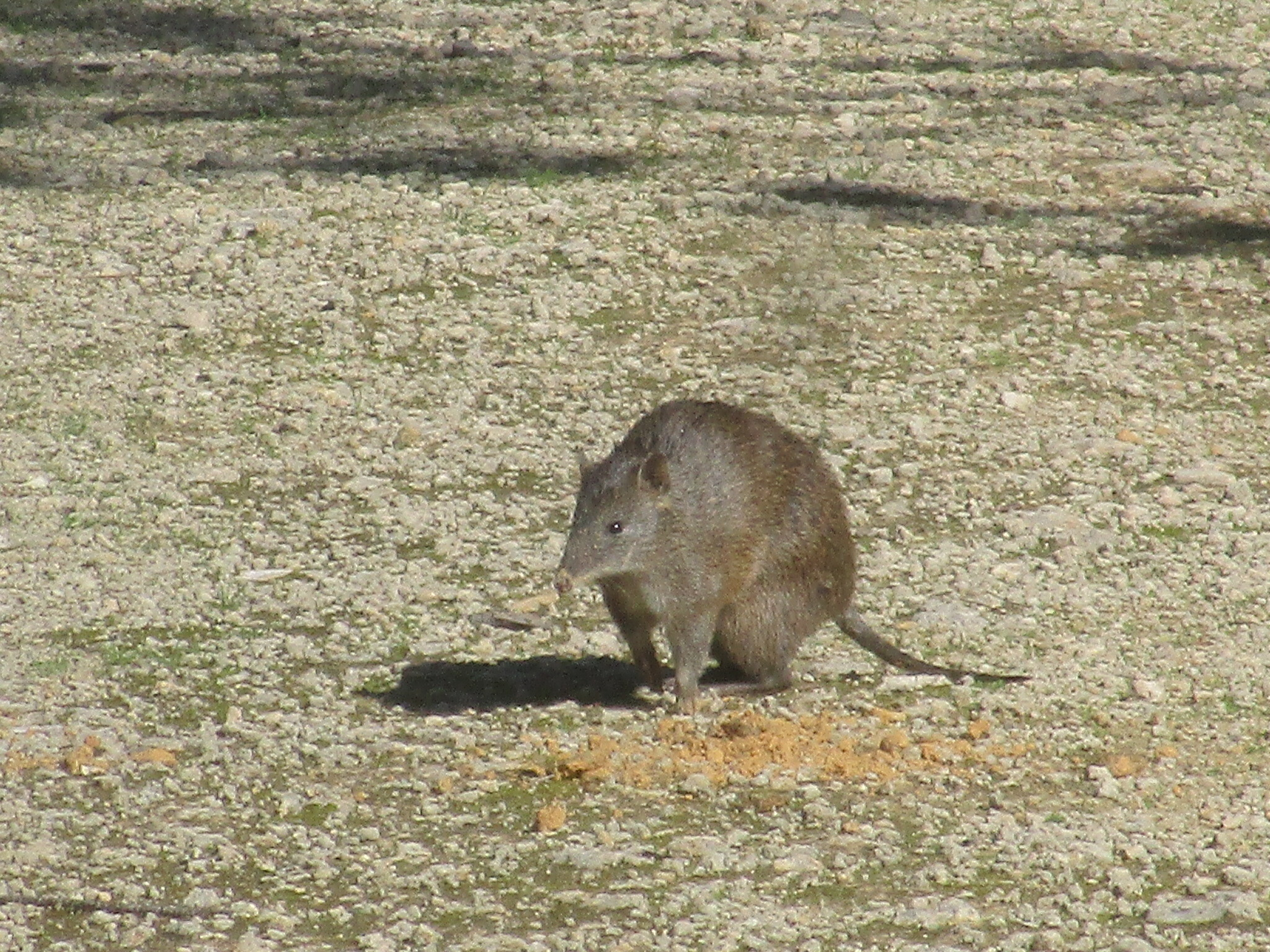
Isoodon fusciventer

Classification within the Peramelemorphia was previously thought to be straightforward, with two families in the order—the short-legged and mostly herbivorous bandicoots, and the longer-legged, nearly carnivorous bilbies. In recent years, however, the situation clearly has become more complex. First, the bandicoots of the New Guinean and far-northern Australian rainforests were deemed distinct from all other bandicoots and were grouped together in the separate family Peroryctidae. More recently, the bandicoot families were reunited in the Peramelidae, with the New Guinean species split into four genera in two subfamilies, Peroryctinae and Echymiperinae, while the "true bandicoots" occupy the subfamily Peramelinae. The only exception is the now-extinct pig-footed bandicoot, which has been given its own family, Chaeropodidae.

- Order Peramelemorphia
  - Superfamily Perameloidea
    - Unclassified family
      - Genus †Galadi: 4 species
      - Genus †Bulungu: 3 species
      - Genus †Madju: 2 species
    - Family Thylacomyidae
      - Genus Macrotis: 2 species
      - Genus †Ischnodon: 1 species
      - Genus †Liyamayi: 1 extinct species
    - Family †Chaeropodidae: Pig-footed bandicoot
      - Genus †Chaeropus: 2 species
    - Family Peramelidae
      - Subfamily Peramelinae
        - Genus Isoodon: short-nosed bandicoots, 3 or 5 species (Note: While the IUCN lists only three species in the genus, Australian sources consider there to be five species of the genus, with two subspecies of I. obesulus being elevated to full species status.)
        - Genus Perameles: long-nosed bandicoots, 3 extant species
      - Subfamily Peroryctinae
        - Genus Peroryctes: New Guinean long-nosed bandicoots, 2 species
      - Subfamily Echymiperinae
        - Genus Echymipera: New Guinean spiny bandicoots, 5 species
        - Genus Microperoryctes: New Guinean mouse bandicoots, 5 species
        - Genus Rhynchomeles: Seram bandicoot, 1 species
  - Superfamily †Yaraloidea
    - Family †Yaralidae
      - Genus †Yarala: 2 species

== Vernacular names ==
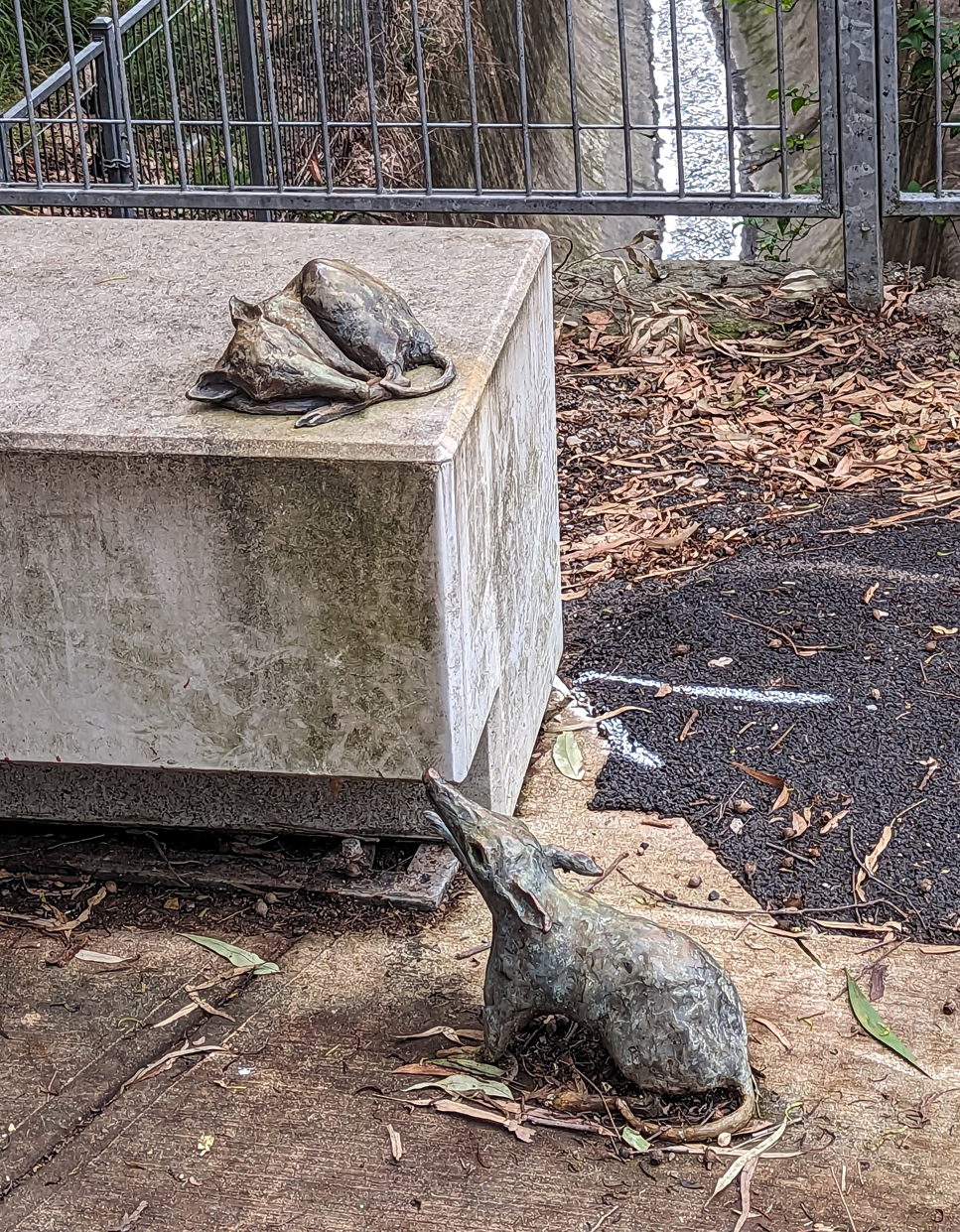
Bandicoots in bronze at the Waratah Mills light rail stop on Sydney's Inner West Light Rail line; public art by Ochre Lawson

The name bandicoot is an Anglicised version of a word from the Telugu language of South India meaning 'pig-rat'. What are now called bandicoots are not found in India and 'bandicoot' was originally applied to completely unrelated mammals—several species of large rat (rodents). Today these species, belonging to the genera Bandicota and Nesokia, are referred to as bandicoot rats.

Bandicoots have different names by the indigenous peoples of the Australia–New Guinea region. For example, the Kaurna people refer to the southern brown bandicoot as the bung or the marti. In Oceanic Motu the name mada is used and in Fijian gwaca, It is known as aine in the Abinomn language of Papua, Indonesia.
