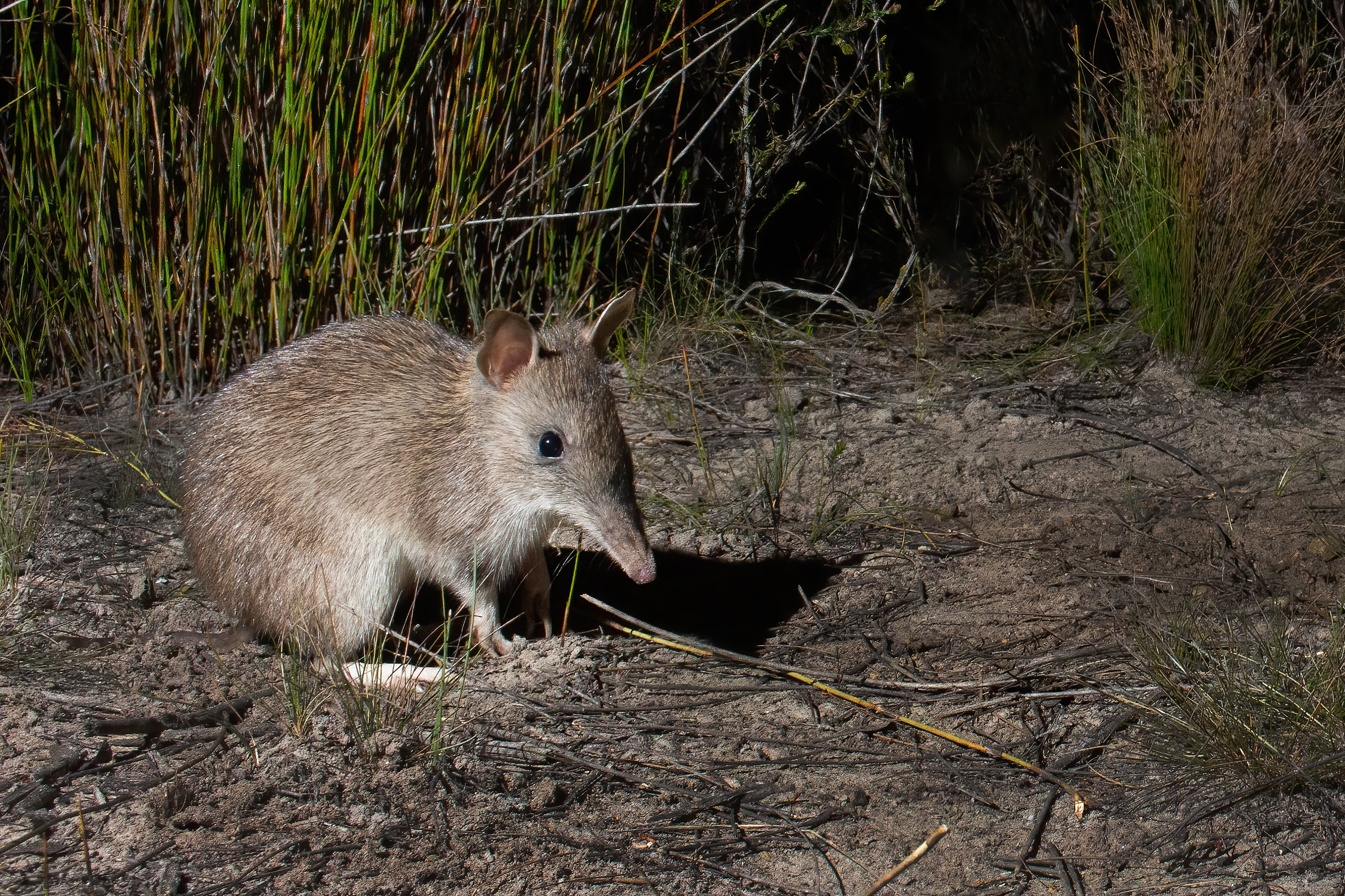
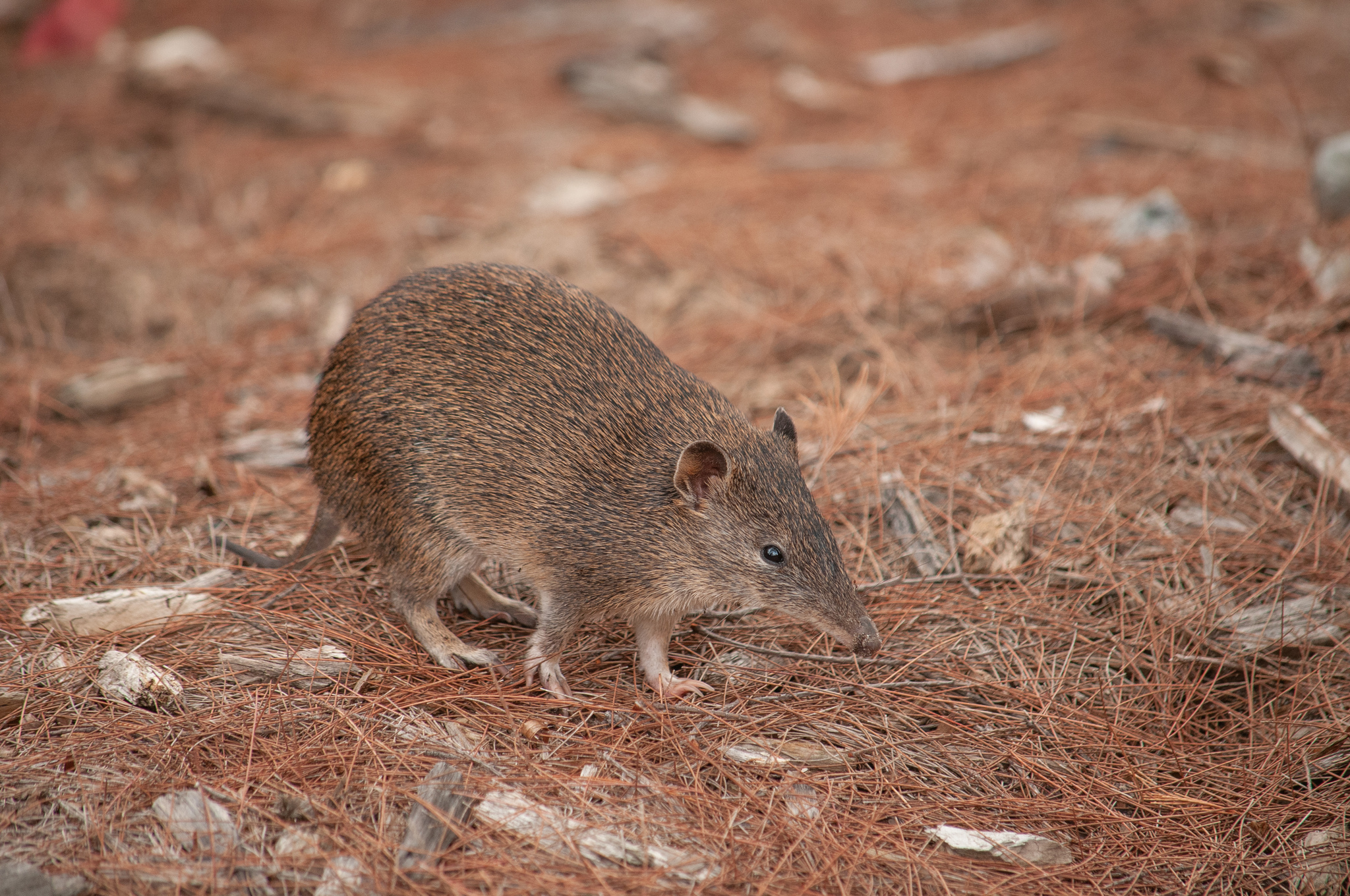
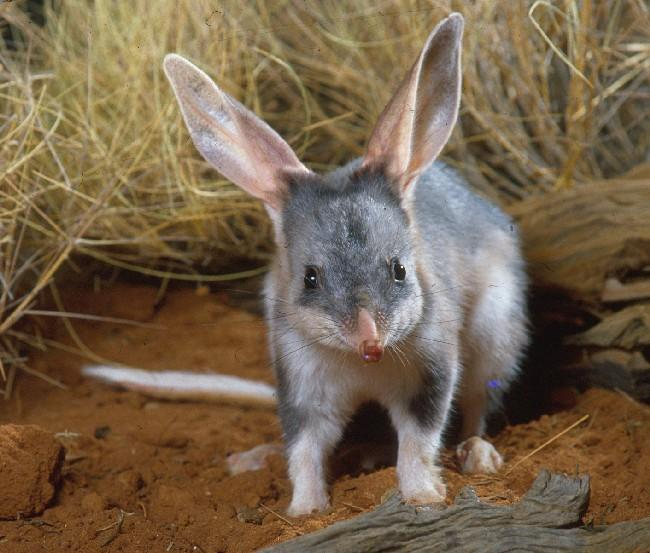
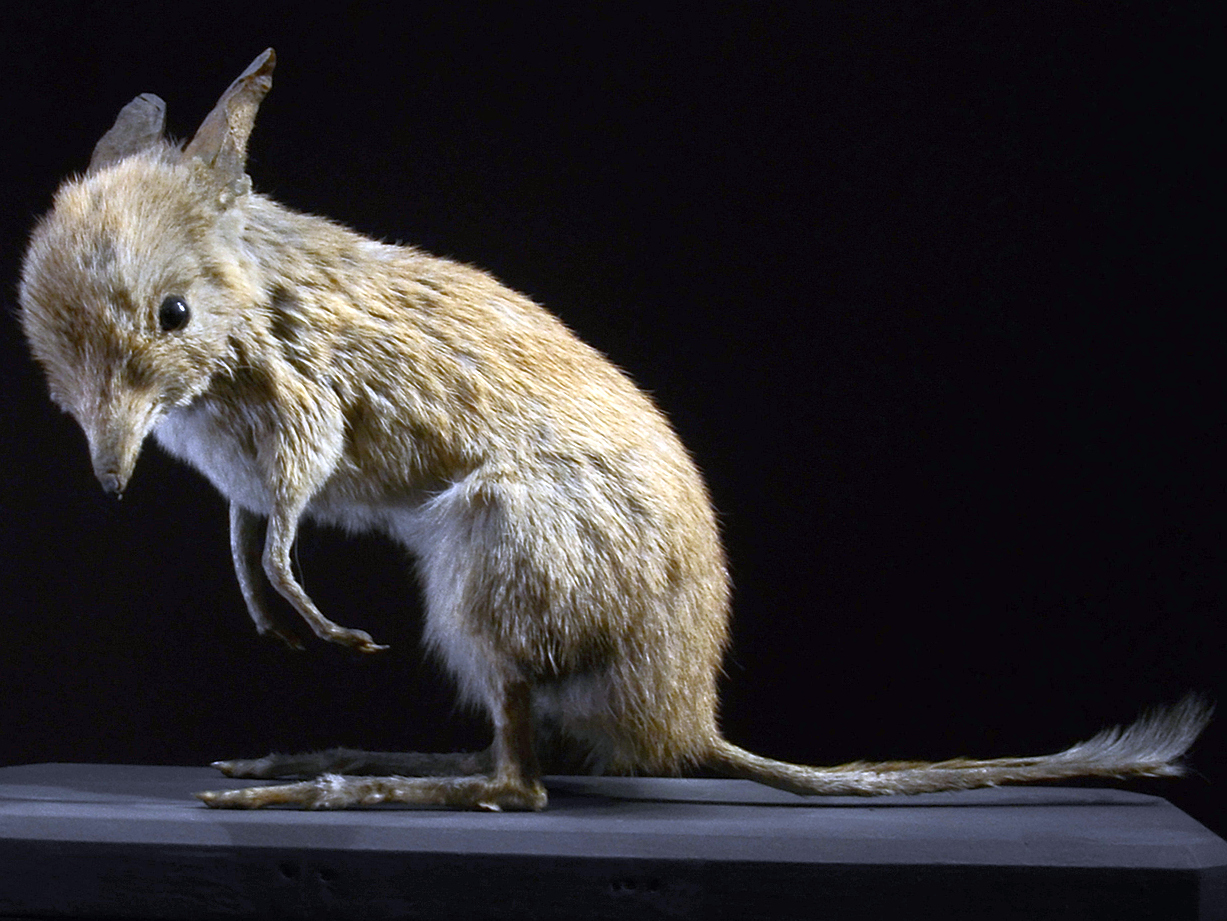
- Clockwise from top-left: Long-nosed bandicoot, Southern brown bandicoot, Northern pig-footed bandicoot, and Greater bilby

Scientific classification
- Kingdom: Animalia
- Phylum: Chordata
- Class: Mammalia
- Infraclass: Marsupialia
- Clade: Agreodontia
- Order: Peramelemorphia; Ameghino, 1889

Families
- Peramelidae (bandicoots); Thylacomyidae (bilbies); †Chaeropodidae (pig-footed bandicoots); †Yaralidae

= Peramelemorphia =

Peramelemorphia Temporal range: Late Oligocene–Recent

Order of marsupials

The order Peramelemorphia (/pɛrəmɛlɪˈmɔːrfiə/ pe-rə-mel-ih-MOR-fee-ə) includes the bandicoots and bilbies. All members of the order are endemic to Australia-New Guinea and most have the characteristic bandicoot shape: a plump, arch-backed body with a long, delicately tapering snout, very large upright ears, relatively long, thin legs, and a thin tail. Their size varies from about 140 grams up to 4 kilograms, but most species are about one kilogram.

== Phylogeny ==
=== Placement within Marsupialia ===
The position of the Peramelemorphia within the marsupial family tree has long been puzzling and controversial. There are two morphological features in the order that appear to show a clear evolutionary link with another marsupial group: the type of foot, and the teeth. Unfortunately, these clear signposts point in opposite directions.

All members of the order are polyprotodont (have several pairs of lower front teeth)—in the case of the Peramelemorphia, three pairs. This suggests that they have evolved within Dasyuromorphia (marsupial carnivores). On the other hand, they also have an unusual feature in their feet: the second and third toes are fused together. This condition is called syndactyly, and is characteristic of the Diprotodontia (the order of marsupial herbivores that includes kangaroos, wombats, possums, and many others).

Attempts to resolve this puzzle include the view that the bandicoot group evolved from the carnivores, retaining the polyprotodont dentition, and independently evolving a syndactyl hind foot; the contrary view that syndactyly is so unusual that it is unlikely to have evolved twice and therefore the bandicoot group must have evolved from a possum-like diprotodont creature, and re-evolved its extra teeth. A third view suggests that the bandicoot group evolved from a primitive carnivore, developed the syndactylous hind foot as a specialisation for climbing, and the diprotodonts then split off and evolved the two-tooth jaw that gives them their name. Recent molecular level investigations do not so far appear to have resolved the puzzle, but do strongly suggest that whatever the relationship of the bandicoot group to the other marsupial orders may be, it is a distant one.

=== Relationships within Peramelemorphia ===
Recent molecular analyses have resulted in a phylogenetic reconstruction of the members of Peramelemorphia with quite strong support. The most basal split separates Thylacomyidae (Macrotis) from all other bandicoots. Probably the next to diverge was the recently extinct Chaeropodidae (Chaeropus). The remaining taxa comprise the Peramelidae, which divides into subfamilies Peramelinae (Isoodon and Perameles) and a clade in which the Echymiperinae (Echymipera and Microperoryctes) form a sister group to Peroryctinae (Peroryctes):

Meredith 2008

- Peramelemorphia
  - - Thylacomyidae
      Macrotis
  - - †Chaeropodidae
      Chaeropus
    - Peramelidae
      - - Peramelinae
          - Isoodon
          - Perameles
      - - Echymiperinae
          - Echymipera
          - Microperoryctes
        - Peroryctinae
          Peroryctes

Upham et al. 2019

- - - Thylacomyidae
      Macrotis
  - - Rhynchomeles
    - - Peramelidae
        - - Peramelinae
            - Isoodon
            - Perameles
        - - Peroryctinae
            Peroryctes
          - Echymiperinae
            - Echymipera
            - Microperoryctes

Álvarez-Carretero et al. 2022

- - - Thylacomyidae
      Macrotis
  - - Peramelidae
      - - Peramelinae
          - Isoodon
          - Perameles
      - - Peroryctinae
          Peroryctes
        - Echymiperinae
          - Echymipera [incl. Rhynchomeles]
          - Microperoryctes

== Fossil record ==
Many specimens of modern peramelemorphian (e.g. Perameles spp. and Isoodon spp.) have been recovered in the fossil record from Pleistocene and Holocene fossil localities. However, very few fossil species have been recovered to date. The first species of fossil peramelemorphian was described by R. A. Stirton in 1955. The specimen Stirton described was a partial lower jaw from the Tirari Desert in Central Australia, Pliocene in age. The lower jaw morphology suggested a relationship with bilbies (Family Thylacomyidae), and was named Ischnodon australis.

It was not until 1976 that Archer and Wade described the next fossil bandicoot. A single upper molar was recovered from the Bluff Downs fossil site, Allingham Formation, in northern Queensland, also Pliocene in age. The tooth was similar to that of species of Perameles, and was therefore named Perameles allinghamensis.

In 1995, the first Miocene species was described from Riversleigh, and was named Yarala burchfieldi by Dr Jeannette Muirhead. The species was represented by several upper and lower jaws, which were smaller than any living bandicoots and had a very primitive dentition. A skull was later recovered in 2000, the first for any fossil peramelemorphian to date. Features of the skull and dentition suggested that Yarala burchfieldi was distinct from other peramelemorphians, and for this reason, a new Superfamily Yaraloidea and Family Yaralidae were erected to classify this species.

In 1997, Muirhead, Dawson and Archer described a new species of Perameles, Perameles bowensis, from teeth recovered from two Pliocene fossil localities, Bow and Wellington Caves. The same species was later reported in 2000 from Chinchilla, Queensland, by Mackness and colleagues. In 2002, Price described a new species Perameles, Perameles sobbei, from the Darling Downs (Pleistocene in age), south-eastern Queensland. This species was represented by a lower jaw and a few isolated lower molars. Additional material were later described in 2005 from the same site, including upper molars.

A second species of Yarala, Yarala kida, was described in 2006 by Schwartz. This species was recovered from Kangaroo Well, a late Oligocene site from the Northern Territory in Australia. This species is thought to be even more primitive than Yarala burchfieldi.

The second fossil skull of any fossil peramelemorphian was also recovered from Miocene sites of Riversleigh. In fact, more than one skull of this new species was found (and several lower and upper jaws), and was significantly different from any other bandicoot to erect a new genus, Galadi. The species was named Galadi speciosus by Travouillon and colleagues. It was short-snouted unlike modern bandicoots suggesting that it was more carnivorous than its omnivorous modern relatives. Its relationship to other bandicoots is unclear, but it was likely to be less primitive than Yarala but more primitive than living bandicoots. An additional three species of Galadi were later described in 2013 and named Galadi grandis, Galadi amplus and Galadi adversus.

Gurovich et al. (2013) described a new species of mouse-sized bandicoot from Riversleigh and from Kutjamarpu, Southern Australia. The species, named Bulungu palara, is represented by a skull and several lower and upper jaws. Two other species in this genus were also described from the Etadunna Formation in South Australia, Bulungu muirheadae which was the oldest fossil bandicoot recovered as of 2013 (about 24 million years old), and Bulungu campbelli.

The oldest modern bandicoot (peramelid) and the oldest bilby (Thylacomyid) were later discovered by Travouillon et al., 2014 from Riversleigh World Heritage Area, from middle Miocene fossil deposits (around 15 million years old). The peramelid, Crash bandicoot, was named after the famous video game character and is only represented by a single upper jaw. The bilby, Liyamayi dayinamed after geologist and philanthropist Robert Day, is only known from 3 teeth (2 upper molar, 1 lower molar).

The first record of sexual dimorphism (difference in size between males and females) in a fossil bandicoot was reported from two new species from Riversleigh (Travouillon et al. 2014). Named Madju variae and Madju encorensis, they are closely related to modern bandicoots, but do not fall in any modern family, as did Galadi and Bulungu. Instead they are classified as Perameloid, with all known Peremelemorphian, to the exclusion of yaralids. Madju variae is also unusual in preserving an ontogenetic series (age series from pouch young to adult), the second of any fossil marsupial mammal in Australia. The study of this ontogenetic series lead researchers to think that Madju variae developed slow than modern bandicoots, much more like a bilby, and therefore the rapid development of modern bandicoots must have evolved after the middle Miocene, when Australia started to become more arid.

== See also ==
- List of mammal genera
- List of recently extinct mammals
- List of prehistoric mammals
