= List of peramelemorphs =

Species in mammal order Peramelemorphia

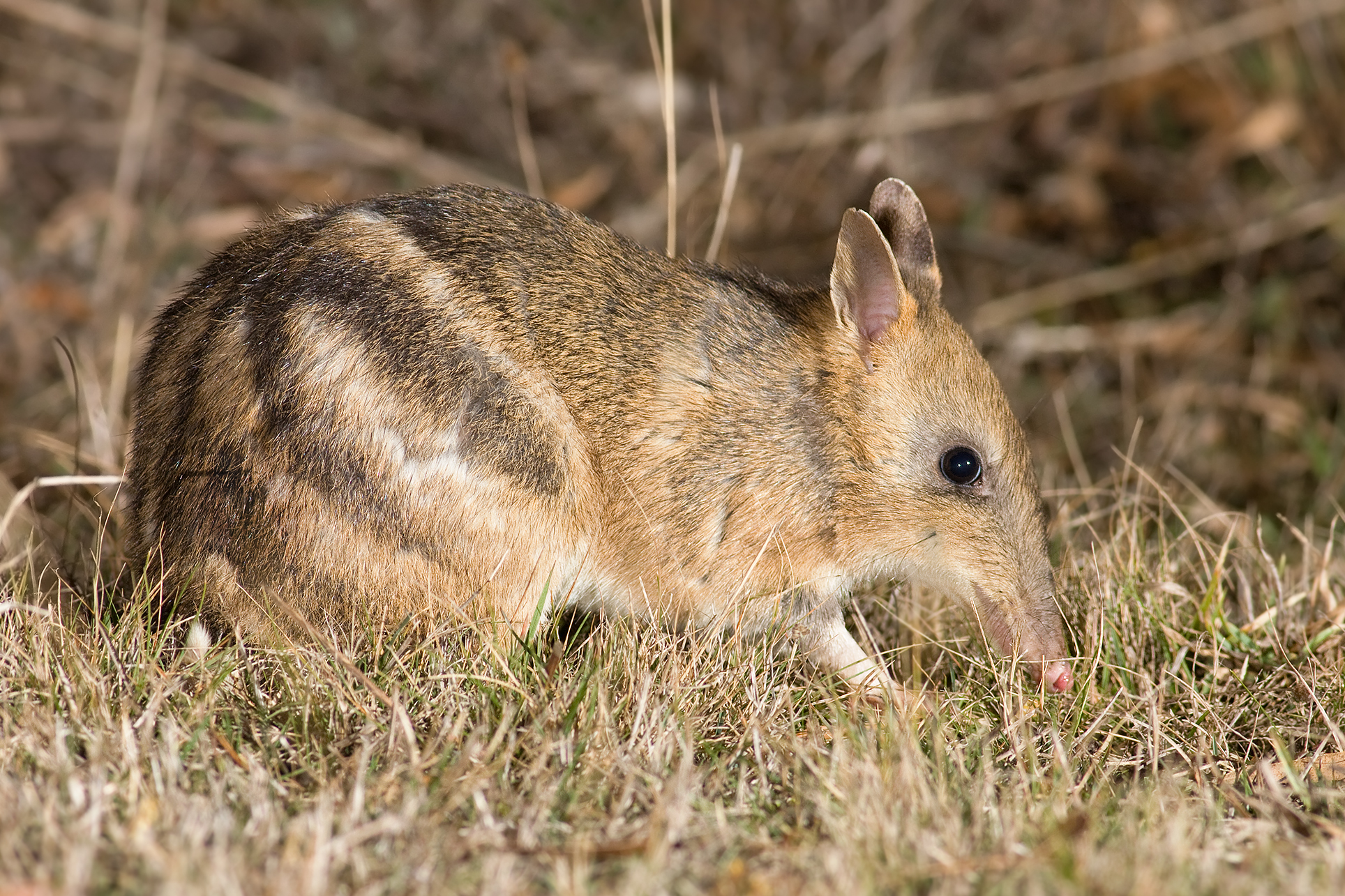
Eastern barred bandicoot (Perameles gunni)

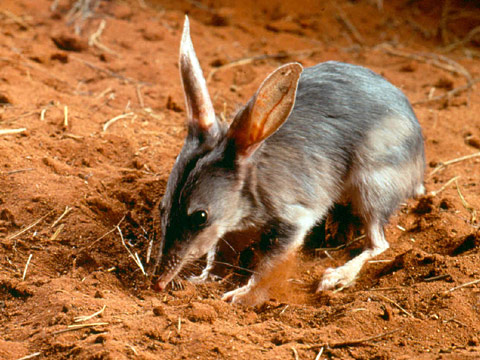
Greater bilby (Macrotis lagotis)

Peramelemorphia is an order of Australian marsupial mammals. Members of this order are called peramelemorphs and include bandicoots and bilbies. They are found in Australia and New Guinea, generally in forests, shrublands, grasslands, and savannas, though some species are found in inland wetlands and deserts. They range in size from the Arfak pygmy bandicoot, at 14 cm (6 in) plus a 11 cm (4 in) tail, to the giant bandicoot, at 56 cm (22 in) plus a 34 cm (13 in) tail. Peramelemorphs primarily eat insects and fruit, as well as other invertebrates and small vertebrates. Most peramelemorphs do not have population estimates, but the ones that do range from 1,000 to 100,000 mature individuals. The giant bandicoot, David's echymipera, and Seram bandicoot are endangered. The desert bandicoot, lesser bilby, and pig-footed bandicoot were driven to extinction in the mid-1900s.

The nineteen extant species of Peramelemorphia are divided into two families: Peramelidae, containing eighteen species divided between three genera in the subfamily Echymiperinae, two genera in the subfamily Peramelinae, and a single genus in the subfamily Peroryctinae; and Thylacomyidae, containing one extant species in a single genus. Additionally, Peramelemorphia includes the extinct family Chaeropodidae, containing a single species. Dozens of extinct, prehistoric Peramelemorphia species have been discovered, though due to ongoing research and discoveries the exact number and categorization is not fixed.

== Conventions ==
IUCN Red List categories
Conservation status
- EX: Extinct (3 species)
- EW: Extinct in the wild (0 species)
- CR: Critically endangered (0 species)
- EN: Endangered (3 species)
- VU: Vulnerable (5 species)
- NT: Near threatened (0 species)
- LC: Least concern (10 species)

Other categories
- DD: Data deficient (1 species)
- NE: Not evaluated (0 species)

The author citation for the species or genus is given after the scientific name; parentheses around the author citation indicate that this was not the original taxonomic placement. Conservation status codes listed follow the International Union for Conservation of Nature (IUCN) Red List of Threatened Species. Range maps are provided wherever possible; if a range map is not available, a description of the peramelemorph's range is provided. Ranges are based on the IUCN Red List for that species unless otherwise noted. All extinct species or subspecies listed alongside extant species went extinct after 1500 CE, and are indicated by a dagger symbol "†".

== Classification ==
- Peramelemorphia
  - - Chaeropodidae†
      Chaeropus†
    - Peramelidae
      - - Peramelinae
          - Isoodon
          - Perameles
      - - Echymiperinae
          - Echymipera
          - Microperoryctes
          - Rhynchomeles
        - Peroryctinae
          Peroryctes
  - - Thylacomyidae
      Macrotis

The order Peramelemorphia consists of nineteen extant species in two extant families, Peramelidae and Thylacomyidae. Peramelidae is divided into three subfamilies: Echymiperinae, containing ten species in three genera; Peramelinae, containing six species in two genera; and Peroryctinae, containing a single species. Thylacomyidae consists of one extant species. Additionally, Peramelemorphia includes the extinct family Chaeropodidae, containing a single species. Three species have been driven to extinction in recent times, all in the mid-1900s: the desert bandicoot in Peramelinae, the lesser bilby in Thylacomyidae, and the pig-footed bandicoot in Chaeropodidae. Many of these species are further subdivided into subspecies. This does not include hybrid species or extinct prehistoric species.

Family Chaeropodidae†

- Genus Chaeropus† (pig-footed bandicoots): one species (one extinct)

Family Peramelidae

- Subfamily Echymiperinae
  - Genus Echymipera (New Guinean spiny bandicoots): five species
  - Genus Microperoryctes (New Guinean mouse bandicoots): four species
  - Genus Rhynchomeles (Seram bandicoot): one species
- Subfamily Peramelinae
  - Genus Isoodon (short-nosed bandicoots): three species
  - Genus Perameles (long-nosed bandicoots): four species (one extinct)
- Subfamily Peroryctinae
  - Genus Peroryctes (New Guinean long-nosed bandicoots): two species

Family Thylacomyidae

- Genus Macrotis (bilbies): two species (one extinct)

== Peramelemorphs ==
The following classification is based on the taxonomy described by the reference work Mammal Species of the World (2005), with augmentation by generally accepted proposals made since using molecular phylogenetic analysis, as supported by both the IUCN and the American Society of Mammalogists.

=== Chaeropodidae ===
Genus Chaeropus† – Ogilby, 1838 – one species
| Common name | Scientific name and subspecies | Range | Size and ecology | IUCN status and estimated population |
|---|---|---|---|---|
| Pig-footed bandicoot† | C. ecaudatus (Note: Although it is not recognized as such by the IUCN, Chaeropus ecaudatus is sometimes split into the southern pig-footed bandicoot (C. ecaudatus) and northern pig-footed bandicoot (C. yirratji).) (Ogilby, 1838) | Central and western Australia | Size: 23–26 cm (9–10 in) long, plus 10–14 cm (4–6 in) tail Habitat: Forest, savanna, shrubland, and grassland Diet: Believed to be omnivorous | EX 0 |

=== Peramelidae ===
==== Subfamily Echymiperinae ====
Genus Echymipera – Lesson, 1842 – five species
| Common name | Scientific name and subspecies | Range | Size and ecology | IUCN status and estimated population |
|---|---|---|---|---|
| Clara's echymipera | E. clara Stein, 1932 | Northern New Guinea | Size: 20–50 cm (8–20 in) long, plus 5–13 cm (2–5 in) tail Habitat: Forest Diet: Omnivorous, primarily fruit | LC Unknown |
| Common echymipera | E. kalubu (J. B. Fischer, 1829) Four subspecies: E. k. cockerelli; E. k. kalubu; E. k. oriomo; E. k. philipi | New Guinea | Size: 22–38 cm (9–15 in) long, plus 8 cm (3 in) tail Habitat: Inland wetlands and forest Diet: Invertebrates and fruit | LC Unknown |
| David's echymipera | E. davidi Flannery, 1990 | Kiriwina island east of New Guinea | Size: 20–50 cm (8–20 in) long, plus 5–13 cm (2–5 in) tail Habitat: Forest Diet: Omnivorous | EN Unknown |
| Long-nosed echymipera | E. rufescens (Peters, Doria, 1875) Two subspecies: E. r. australis; E. r. rufescens | New Guinea and northeastern Australia | Size: 20–50 cm (8–20 in) long, plus 5–13 cm (2–5 in) tail Habitat: Forest, shrubland, and grassland Diet: Fruit, seeds, invertebrates, fungi, and plants | LC Unknown |
| Menzies' echymipera | E. echinista Menzies, 1990 | Southern New Guinea | Size: 20–50 cm (8–20 in) long, plus 5–13 cm (2–5 in) tail Habitat: Savanna and forest Diet: Omnivorous | DD Unknown |

Genus Microperoryctes – Stein, 1932 – four species
| Common name | Scientific name and subspecies | Range | Size and ecology | IUCN status and estimated population |
|---|---|---|---|---|
| Arfak pygmy bandicoot | M. aplini Helgen, Flannery, 2004 | Western New Guinea | Size: 14–16 cm (6 in) long, plus 11–12 cm (4–5 in) tail Habitat: Forest Diet: Insects as well as fruit | VU Unknown |
| Mouse bandicoot | M. murina Stein, 1932 | Western New Guinea | Size: 15–18 cm (6–7 in) long, plus 10–11 cm (4 in) tail Habitat: Forest Diet: Insects as well as fruit | VU Unknown |
| Papuan bandicoot | M. papuensis (Laurie, 1952) | Eastern New Guinea | Size: 17–20 cm (7–8 in) long, plus 13–16 cm (5–6 in) tail Habitat: Forest Diet: Insects as well as fruit | LC Unknown |
| Striped bandicoot | M. longicauda (Peters, Doria, 1876) Three subspecies: M. l. dorsalis; M. l. longicauda; M. l. ornatus | New Guinea | Size: 23–31 cm (9–12 in) long, plus 14–26 cm (6–10 in) tail Habitat: Forest and grassland Diet: Insects as well as fruit | LC Unknown |

Genus Rhynchomeles – Thomas, 1920 – one species
| Common name | Scientific name and subspecies | Range | Size and ecology | IUCN status and estimated population |
|---|---|---|---|---|
| Seram bandicoot | R. prattorum Thomas, 1920 | Seram Island west of New Guinea | Size: 24–33 cm (9–13 in) long, plus 10–13 cm (4–5 in) tail Habitat: Forest Diet: Unknown | EN Unknown |

==== Subfamily Peramelinae ====
Genus Isoodon – Desmarest, 1817 – three species
| Common name | Scientific name and subspecies | Range | Size and ecology | IUCN status and estimated population |
|---|---|---|---|---|
| Golden bandicoot | I. auratus (Ramsay, 1887) Three subspecies: I. a. arnhemensis; I. a. auratus; I. a. barrowensis | Northwestern Australia | Size: 19–30 cm (7–12 in) long, plus 8–13 cm (3–5 in) tail Habitat: Savanna, shrubland, and grassland Diet: Insects and arachnids, as well as turtle eggs, small reptiles, and plant material | LC 25,000–50,000 |
| Northern brown bandicoot | I. macrourus (Gould, 1842) Two subspecies: I. m. macrourus; I. m. moresbyensis | Northern and eastern Australia and southern New Guinea (former in black) | Size: 30–47 cm (12–19 in) long, plus 8–22 cm (3–9 in) tail Habitat: Forest, savanna, shrubland, and grassland Diet: Insects, as well as lizards, birds, plant matter, and fungi | LC Unknown |
| Southern brown bandicoot | I. obesulus (Shaw, 1797) Two subspecies: I. o. nauticus; I. o. obesulus | Southwestern and southeastern Australia | Size: 28–36 cm (11–14 in) long, plus 9–14 cm (4–6 in) tail Habitat: Forest, shrubland, grassland, and inland wetlands Diet: Plants, fungi, and invertebrates | LC 10,000–100,000 |

Genus Perameles – Geoffroy, 1803 – four species
| Common name | Scientific name and subspecies | Range | Size and ecology | IUCN status and estimated population |
|---|---|---|---|---|
| Desert bandicoot† | P. eremiana Spencer, 1897 | Central Australia | Size: 20–43 cm (8–17 in) long, plus 7–17 cm (3–7 in) tail Habitat: Shrubland, grassland, and desert Diet: Believed to be insects, as well as worms, snails, mice, lizards, and plants | EX 0 |
| Eastern barred bandicoot | P. gunnii Gray, 1838 | Southern Australia | Size: 20–43 cm (8–17 in) long, plus 7–17 cm (3–7 in) tail Habitat: Grassland Diet: Insects and arachnids, as well as small vertebrates and plants | VU 10,000–100,000 |
| Long-nosed bandicoot | P. nasuta Geoffroy, 1804 | Eastern Australia | Size: 20–43 cm (8–17 in) long, plus 7–17 cm (3–7 in) tail Habitat: Forest, shrubland, and grassland Diet: Insects, arachnids, small vertebrates, plant roots, and fungi | LC Unknown |
| Western barred bandicoot | P. bougainville Quoy, Gaimard, 1824 | Scattered western and central Australia | Size: 20–43 cm (8–17 in) long, plus 7–17 cm (3–7 in) tail Habitat: Shrubland and grassland Diet: Invertebrates, plants, roots, herbs, seeds, berries, and fungi, as well as small vertebrates | VU 1,000–5,000 |

==== Subfamily Peroryctinae ====
Genus Peroryctes – Thomas, 1906 – two species
| Common name | Scientific name and subspecies | Range | Size and ecology | IUCN status and estimated population |
|---|---|---|---|---|
| Giant bandicoot | P. broadbenti (Ramsay, 1879) | Eastern New Guinea | Size: 39–56 cm (15–22 in) long, plus 11–34 cm (4–13 in) tail Habitat: Forest Diet: Believed to be omnivorous | EN Unknown |
| Raffray's bandicoot | P. raffrayana (Milne-Edwards, 1878) Two subspecies: P. r. raffrayana; P. r. rothschildi | New Guinea | Size: 17–39 cm (7–15 in) long, plus 11–23 cm (4–9 in) tail Habitat: Forest, shrubland, and grassland Diet: Insects, as well as other invertebrates, small vertebrates, and plants | LC Unknown |

=== Thylacomyidae ===
Genus Macrotis – Reid, 1837 – two species
| Common name | Scientific name and subspecies | Range | Size and ecology | IUCN status and estimated population |
|---|---|---|---|---|
| Greater bilby | M. lagotis Reid, 1837 | Western and central Australia | Size: 29–55 cm (11–22 in) long, plus 20–29 cm (8–11 in) tail Habitat: Savanna and grassland Diet: Seeds, bulbs, invertebrates, fruit, fungi, and lizards, as well as eggs and small mammals | VU 9,000 |
| Lesser bilby† | M. leucura Thomas, 1887 | Central Australia | Size: 20–27 cm (8–11 in) long, plus 12–17 cm (5–7 in) tail Habitat: Savanna, shrubland, and grassland Diet: Insects, fruit, seeds, and fungi | EX 0 |

== Sources ==
- Groves, Colin P. (2005). Wilson, Don E.; Reeder, DeeAnn M. (eds.). Mammal Species of the World. Vol. 1 (3rd ed.). Johns Hopkins University Press. ISBN 978-0-8018-8221-0.
- Nowak, Ronald M. (2005). Walker's Marsupials of the World. Johns Hopkins University Press. ISBN 978-0-8018-8222-7.
- Nowak, Ronald M. (2018). Walker's Mammals of the World. Vol. Monotremes, Marsupials, Afrotherians, Xenarthrans, and Sundatherians. Johns Hopkins University Press. ISBN 978-1-4214-2468-2.
- Strahan, Ronald (1995). Mammals of Australia. Smithsonian Institution. ISBN 978-1-56098-673-7.
