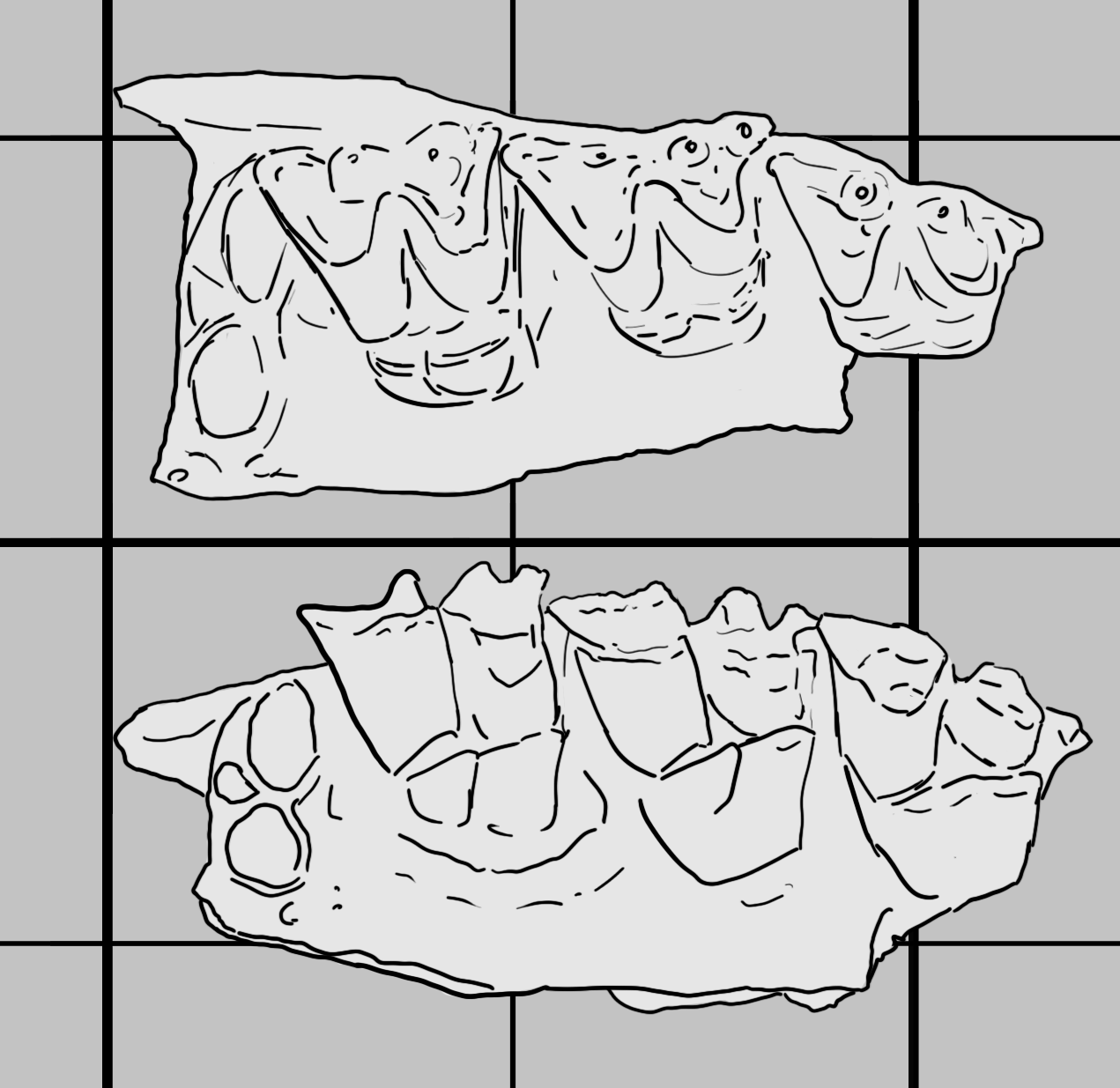
- Illustration of the holotype specimen

Scientific classification
- Kingdom: Animalia
- Phylum: Chordata
- Class: Mammalia
- Infraclass: Marsupialia
- Order: Peramelemorphia
- Family: Peramelidae
- Subfamily: Peramelinae
- Genus: †Crash; Travouillon et al., 2014
- Species: †C. bandicoot

Binomial name
- †Crash bandicoot Travouillon et al., 2014

= Crash bandicoot (species) =

Crash bandicoot Temporal range: Middle Miocene, 15.11–14.17 Ma

Fossil species of marsupial

Crash bandicoot (named for the videogame character) is an extinct species of bandicoot that lived in Australia during the Middle Miocene. It is the only member of the genus Crash, which was named and described in 2014. The only known specimen was found at the Riversleigh World Heritage Area in north-western Queensland. It is one of the oldest known modern bandicoots.

== Discovery and naming ==
Location of the Riversleigh World Heritage Area in Queensland

The fossil remains of Crash bandicoot were discovered at Alan's Ledge 1990 Site (AL90) of the Riversleigh World Heritage Area, in the Boodjamulla National Park of north-western Queensland. The holotype and only known specimen is QM F56245, and consists of a right maxillary fragment with the first three molars intact and the alveoli of the fourth molar. It was found preserved in a limestone matrix, and was extracted via acid maceration.

In 2014, Kenny J. Travouillon, Suzanne J. Hand, Michael Archer and Karen H. Black described Crash bandicoot as a new genus and species of peramelid based on these remains. The primary etymology is a reference to the eponymous character of the video game franchise Crash Bandicoot. The name also alludes to the species "crashing" out of a region of wet rainforest and radiating in the semiarid to arid habitat favoured by the modern species of bandicoots. The gender of the genus name Crash is stated to be masculine.

== Description ==
Crash bandicoot was a rather large species of bandicoot. Its body mass has been estimated at 1.08 kg (2.38 lbs) based on tooth size.

The upper molars of Crash lack a complete centrocrista, as the postparacrista does not contact the premetacrista. Instead, a small bridge, possibly a remnant of the centrocrista, connects the parastylar shelf to the metastylar shelf, but only on the first two molars. Additionally, the molars have a large and distinct metaconular hypocone and a well-developed anterior cingulum (shelf). A posterior cingulum, however, is only present on the first molar. The stylar shelves bear several minor cusps. Stylar cusp A is connected to the paracone by the preparacrista on the second and third molars. These molars also have a distinct and conical stylar cusp B. Stylar cusp C is only present on the first and third molars, a feature not seen in any other bandicoot. A stylar crest connects stylar cusp D to the metastyle on the first two molars.

== Classification ==
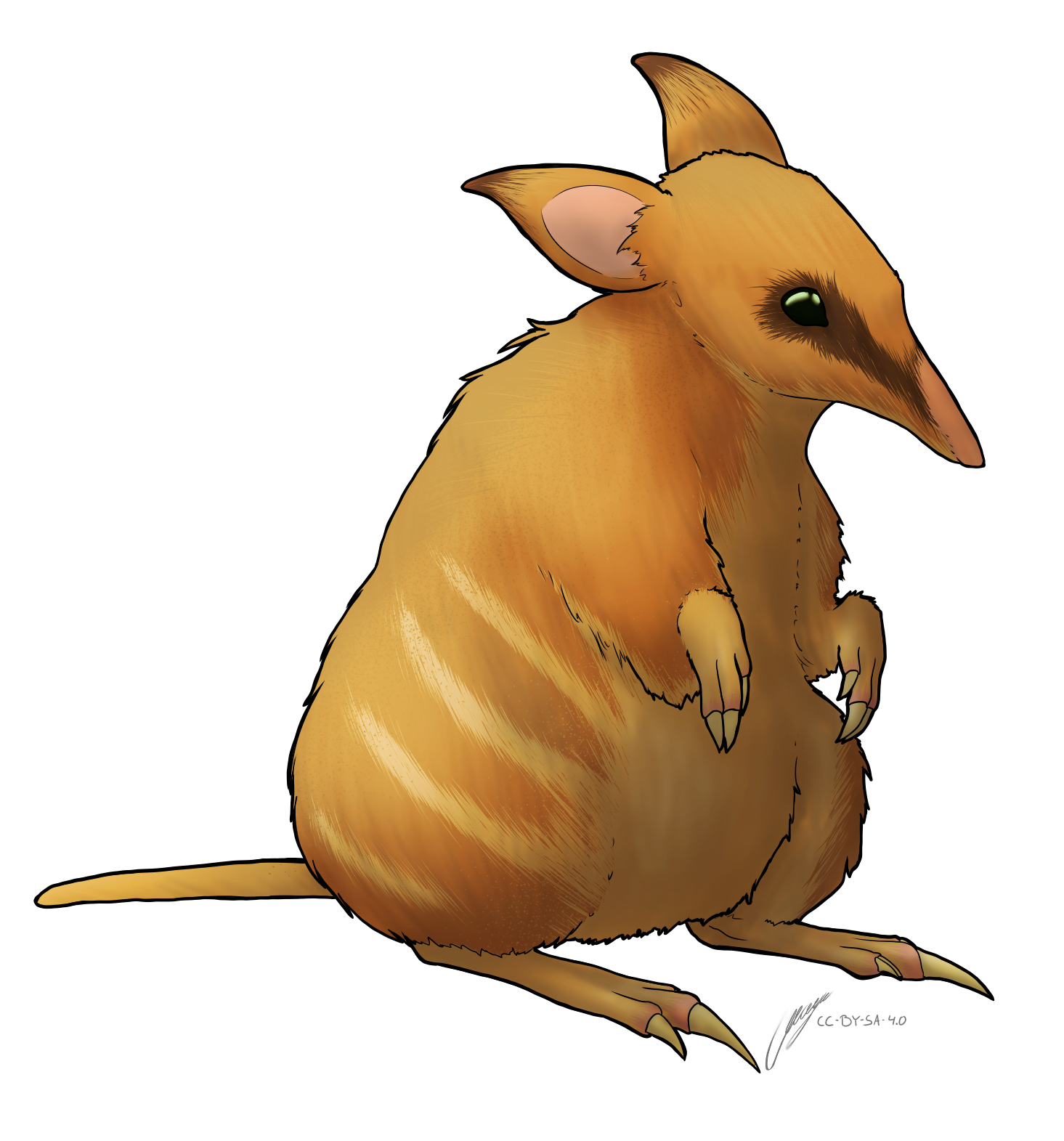
Life reconstruction of Crash

To test the affinities and relationships of Crash bandicoot, Travouillon and colleagues placed in within the phylogenetic matrices of Travouillon et al. (2013) and Gurovich et al. (2013). Both analyses recovered it within crown group Peramelemorphia, within an unresolved clade containing species of Perameles and Isoodon. The authors found that Crash has several synapomorphies that appear to place it in the subfamily Peramelinae (e.g. presence of a metaconular hypocone, incomplete centrocrista, and a well-developed anterior cingulum), which would make it the oldest modern bandicoot by at least 5-10 million years. This suggests that modern bandicoots first evolved in rainforest before subsequently diversifying into other environments. An abbreviated version of the unconstrained parsimony tree they provide can be seen below.

- Peramelemorphia
  - - Yaralidae
      - †Yarala burchfieldi
      - †Yarala kida
    - - - †Galadi adversus
        - - †Galadi grandis
          - - †Galadi speciosus
            - †Galadi amplus
  - Perameloidea
    - †cf. Peroryctes tedfordi
    - - †cf. Peroryctes sp.
      - - †Bulungu palara
        - - - †Liyamayi dayi
            - - Thylacomyidae
                - †Ischnodon australis
                - - Macrotis lagotis
                  - †Macrotis leucura
              - - Chaeropodidae
                  †Chaeropus ecaudatus
                - Peramelidae
                  - Perameles gunnii
                  - - Perameles nasuta
                    - †Perameles sobbei
                    - †Perameles bowensis
                    - †Perameles allinghamensis
                    - †Crash bandicoot
                    - - Isoodon auratus
                      - Isoodon obesulus
                      - Isoodon macrourus
                    - - Perameles bougainville
                      - †Perameles eremiana
          - Peroryctidae
            - - Microperoryctes longicauda
              - Microperoryctes papuensis
            - - Peroryctes raffrayana
              - - Rhynchomeles prattorum
                - Echymipera davidi
                - - Peroryctes broadbenti
                  - Echymipera clara
                - - Echymipera kalubu
                  - Echymipera rufescens

In their description of the archaic peramelemorphian Lemdubuoryctes, Kear et al. (2016) recovered Crash as either a stem perameloid or stem peramelid.

== Paleoenvironment ==
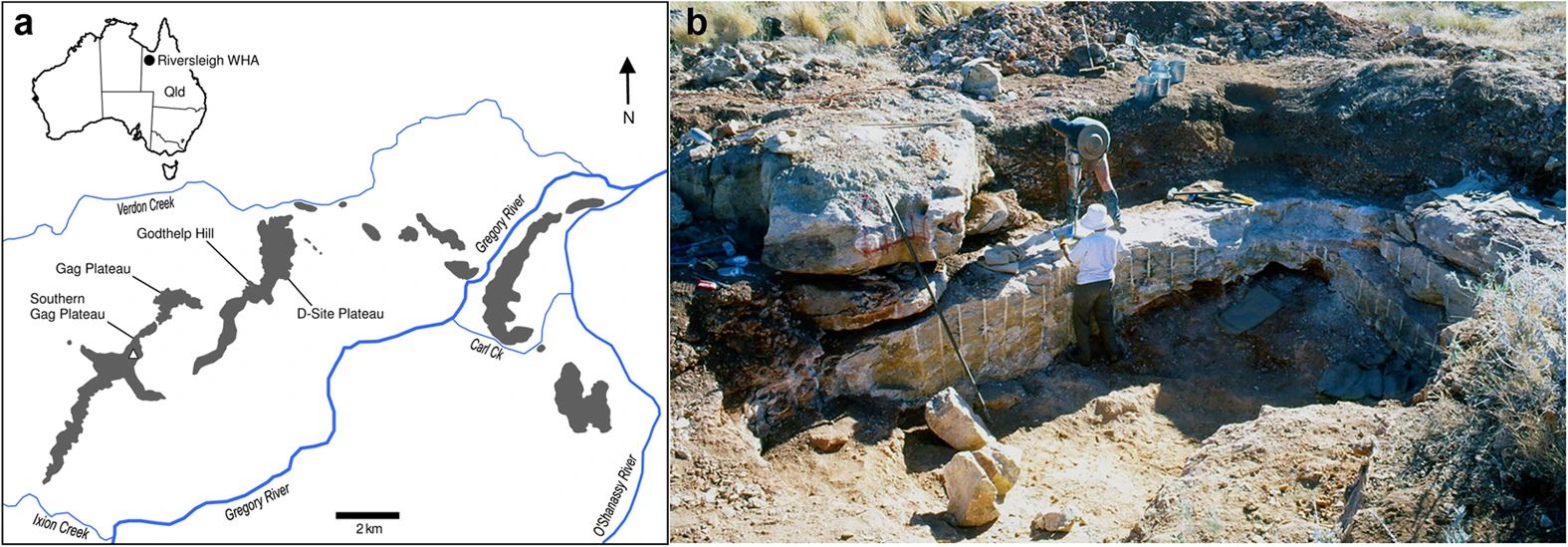
Map of the Riversleigh World Heritage Area (a) and excavation of Alan's Ledge 1990 Site (b).

Crash bandicoot stems from AL90 Site at the Riversleigh World Heritage Area, which is interpreted as being part of Riversleigh's Faunal Zone C. Radiometric dating of speleothems indicates the deposit is 14.64 ± 0.47 million years old (Ma), placing it within the Middle Miocene subepoch. The site represents a cave deposit, the original entrance of which appears to have acted as a natural pit-fall trap. Various factors like the high number of arboreal taxa, overall species richness and the presence of certain rainforest taxa suggests that a lowland rainforest environment was next to and potentially overhanging the cave entrance. Crash was sympatric with other bandicoots, such as Bulungu palara, which was a lot smaller and insectivorous.

A vast diversity of fauna is known from AL90 Site, comprising mammals and other vertebrates. Possums are especially abundant at this locality and are represented by the burramyid Burramys, several unnamed pseudocheirids as well as Marlu, and the phalangerids Archerus and "Trichosurus". Other mammals include the dasyuromorphs Malleodectes and Nimbacinus, the diprotodontids Neohelos and Nimbadon, the koala Nimiokoala, the macropods Balbaroo, Ganguroo and Rhizosthenurus, the highly unusual marsupial Yalkaparidon, and several species of bats. Other vertebrates include birds (such as Emuarius and Australlus), lizards, snakes, and amphibians.
