= Laurie's moss mouse =

Scientific classification
- Kingdom: Animalia
- Phylum: Chordata
- Class: Mammalia
- Order: Rodentia
- Family: Muridae
- Genus: Pseudohydromys
- Species: P. eleanorae

Binomial name
- Pseudohydromys eleanorae K. M. Helgen & L. Helgen, 2009

Species of rodent

Laurie’s moss mouse (Pseudohydromys eleanorae) is a species of mouse belonging to the family Muridae that is endemic to Papua New Guinea. It was first described in 2009.

== Description ==
Pseudohydromys eleanorae is a small rodent with a head and body length of 94 to 103 mm (3.7 to 4.1 in) and a tail length of 89 to 92 mm (3.5 to 3.6 in). Its appearance is similar to that of Pseudohydromys murinus but there are a number of distinguishing features. The fur is short and dense, the upper and ventral parts are grey, the dorsal parts of the legs are covered in small silver hairs, it has short whiskers and small eyes, and the tail is brown with a white tip.

== Habitat ==
The species is found between 2,740 and 3,050 m (8,990 and 10,010 ft) in the Bismarck and Hagen mountain ranges of Chimbu Province, Papua New Guinea.
