= Obi Island rat =

Scientific classification
- Kingdom: Animalia
- Phylum: Chordata
- Class: Mammalia
- Order: Rodentia
- Family: Muridae
- Genus: Rattus
- Species: R. ombirah

Binomial name
- Rattus ombirah P.-H. Fabre, Miguez, Holden, Fitriana, Semiadi, Musser, & K. M. Helgen, 2023

Species of mammal

The Obi Island rat (Rattus ombirah) is a species of rat from Indonesia. It was originally described in 2023 under the preoccupied name Rattus obiensis and renamed in the following year.
