= Bishop's moss mouse =

Conservation status
- Least Concern (IUCN 3.1)

Scientific classification
- Kingdom: Animalia
- Phylum: Chordata
- Class: Mammalia
- Order: Rodentia
- Family: Muridae
- Genus: Pseudohydromys
- Species: P. berniceae

Binomial name
- Pseudohydromys berniceae K. M. Helgen & L. Helgen, 2009

Species of rodent

Bishop's moss mouse (Pseudohydromys berniceae) is a species of mouse belonging to the family Muridae that is endemic to Papua New Guinea.
