= Woolley's moss mouse =

Pseudohydromys patriciae

Scientific classification
- Kingdom: Animalia
- Phylum: Chordata
- Class: Mammalia
- Order: Rodentia
- Family: Muridae
- Genus: Pseudohydromys
- Species: P. patriciae

Binomial name
- Pseudohydromys patriciae K. M. Helgen & L. Helgen, 2009

Species of rodent

Woolley's moss mouse (Pseudohydromys patriciae) is a species of mouse endemic to Papua New Guinea. It was first described in 2009.
