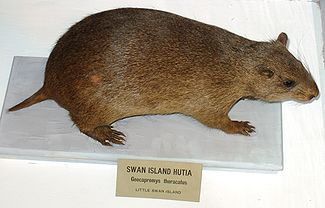

Conservation status
- Extinct (1955) (IUCN 3.1)

Scientific classification
- Kingdom: Animalia
- Phylum: Chordata
- Class: Mammalia
- Order: Rodentia
- Family: Echimyidae
- Genus: Geocapromys
- Species: †G. thoracatus

Binomial name
- †Geocapromys thoracatus (F. W. True, 1888)

= Little Swan Island hutia =

Extinct species of rodent

The Little Swan Island hutia (Geocapromys thoracatus) is an extinct species of rodent that lived on Little Swan Island, off northeastern Honduras in the Caribbean. It was a slow-moving, guinea-pig-like rodent and probably emerged from caves and limestone crevices to forage on bark, small twigs and leaves.

== Taxonomy ==
It may have been a subspecies of the Jamaican hutia (Geocapromys browni), whose ancestors were carried to the island from Jamaica, 5,000–7,000 years ago. It was fairly common in the early 20th century, but disappeared after a severe hurricane (Hurricane Janet) in 1955, followed by the introduction of house cats to the island.
