= Crash Bandicoot (disambiguation) =

Crash Bandicoot is a video game series.

Crash Bandicoot may also refer to:

- Crash Bandicoot (character), the protagonist of the series
- Crash Bandicoot (video game), the first game in the series
- Crash bandicoot (species), a fossil species of bandicoot discovered in Australia
