= White-bellied moss mouse =

Scientific classification
- Kingdom: Animalia
- Phylum: Chordata
- Class: Mammalia
- Order: Rodentia
- Family: Muridae
- Genus: Pseudohydromys
- Species: P. sandrae

Binomial name
- Pseudohydromys sandrae K. M. Helgen & L. Helgen, 2009

Species of rodent

The white-bellied moss mouse (Pseudohydromys sandrae) is a species of mouse endemic to Papua New Guinea. It was first described in 2009. The type specimen was an adult male found between 800 and 850 m, in Southern Highlands Province of Papua New Guinea.
