= German's one-toothed moss mouse =

Conservation status
- Data Deficient (IUCN 3.1)

Scientific classification
- Kingdom: Animalia
- Phylum: Chordata
- Class: Mammalia
- Order: Rodentia
- Family: Muridae
- Genus: Pseudohydromys
- Species: P. germani

Binomial name
- Pseudohydromys germani (Helgen, 2005)

Synonyms
- Mayermys germani

Species of rodent

German's one-toothed moss mouse (Pseudohydromys germani) is a species of rodent in the family Muridae which occurs in the mountains of southeastern New Guinea.

== Taxonomy ==
It was first described in the genus Mayermys, but this genus, which only included the two one-molared species, has since been synonymised under Pseudohydromys because of the close morphological resemblances among Mayermys and the other species now placed in Pseudohydromys. As a member of the Xeromys division within the subfamily Murinae, P. germani is related to the false water rat (Xeromys myoides) of Australia and southern New Guinea and to the three species of Leptomys, another New Guinean genus, and more distantly to other New Guinean and Australian rodents, including the water rat.

== Description ==
Like its relative, P. germani is a small, inconspicuous, shrew-like mouse, but it is slightly larger and has darker (dark grey as opposed to pale grey) ears and a sparsely haired tail with short hairs (the other species has more and longer hairs). Its molars, however, are even smaller (less than 1 mm) than the other species's tiny teeth. The upper incisors are proodont, but less so than in the one-toothed shrew mouse. The head-body length is 105 mm, the tail length 103 mm, the hindfoot length 21 mm, the ear length 12.6 mm and the weight 29.5 g. It has only one molar and only one incisor in each jaw quadrant for a total of eight teeth, less than any other rodents except for its close relative, the one-toothed shrew mouse (P. ellermani) and the recently described Paucidentomys, which lacks molars entirely.

== Distribution and habitat ==
It is known from only one specimen, an adult male which was caught at an altitude of 1300 m in the village of Munimun, Milne Bay Province, southeastern Papua New Guinea in August 1992. P. germani was first described in 2005 by biologist Kristofer Helgen and named after Pavel German, who caught the specimen.
