= Centella Cave =

Archaeological site in Cuba

- Location within Cuba
- Interactive map of Centella Cave
- Location: Cárdenas Municipality, Cuba
- Nearest city: Matanzas, Cuba
- Coordinates: 23°01′18.5″N 81°28′30.0″W

Centella Cave (Spanish: Cueva Centella) is an archeological site Cuba. It is located 1.2 km south of the Vía Blanca highway, west of Matanzas, not far from the Juan Gualberto Gómez Airport.

Remains from at least half a dozen individuals have been found at the site. Some of these remains showed evidence of secondary burial (being moved from their original location).

Remains of the extinct rodent genus Geocapromys were also found at the site.
