= One-toothed shrew mouse =

Conservation status
- Least Concern (IUCN 3.1)

Scientific classification
- Kingdom: Animalia
- Phylum: Chordata
- Class: Mammalia
- Order: Rodentia
- Family: Muridae
- Genus: Pseudohydromys
- Species: P. ellermani

Binomial name
- Pseudohydromys ellermani (Laurie & Hill, 1954)

Species of rodent

The one-toothed shew mouse (Pseudohydromys ellermani) is a species of rodent in the family Muridae. It is found in West Papua, Indonesia and Papua New Guinea, at elevations from 1,200 to 3,000 m. It is most closely related to Pseudohydromys germani.
