= Huon small-toothed moss mouse =

Conservation status
- Data Deficient (IUCN 3.1)

Scientific classification
- Kingdom: Animalia
- Phylum: Chordata
- Class: Mammalia
- Order: Rodentia
- Family: Muridae
- Genus: Pseudohydromys
- Species: P. carlae

Binomial name
- Pseudohydromys carlae K. M. Helgen & L. Helgen, 2009

Species of rodent

The huon small-toothed moss mouse (Pseudohydromys carlae) is a species of mouse belonging to the family Muridae that is endemic to Papua New Guinea.
