= Eastern striped bandicoot =

Scientific classification
- Domain: Eukaryota
- Kingdom: Animalia
- Phylum: Chordata
- Class: Mammalia
- Infraclass: Marsupialia
- Order: Peramelemorphia
- Family: Peramelidae
- Genus: Microperoryctes
- Species: M. ornata

Binomial name
- Microperoryctes ornata (Thomas, 1904)

Species of marsupial

The eastern striped bandicoot (Microperoryctes ornata) is a species of marsupial in the family Peramelidae. It is found in eastern Papua New Guinea in the Enga Province. It is endemic to mountain forested habitats ranging from 1,000 – 3,600 m in elevation. The eastern striped bandicoot is a terrestrial omnivore.

It was previously listed as a subspecies of Microperoryctes longicauda.

== Description ==
The eastern striped bandicoot has a tail length is from 17.4 cm to 19.8 cm.
