= Mottled-tailed shrew mouse =

Conservation status
- Least Concern (IUCN 3.1)

Scientific classification
- Kingdom: Animalia
- Phylum: Chordata
- Class: Mammalia
- Infraclass: Placentalia
- Order: Rodentia
- Family: Muridae
- Genus: Pseudohydromys
- Species: P. fuscus

Binomial name
- Pseudohydromys fuscus (Laurie, 1952)

Species of rodent

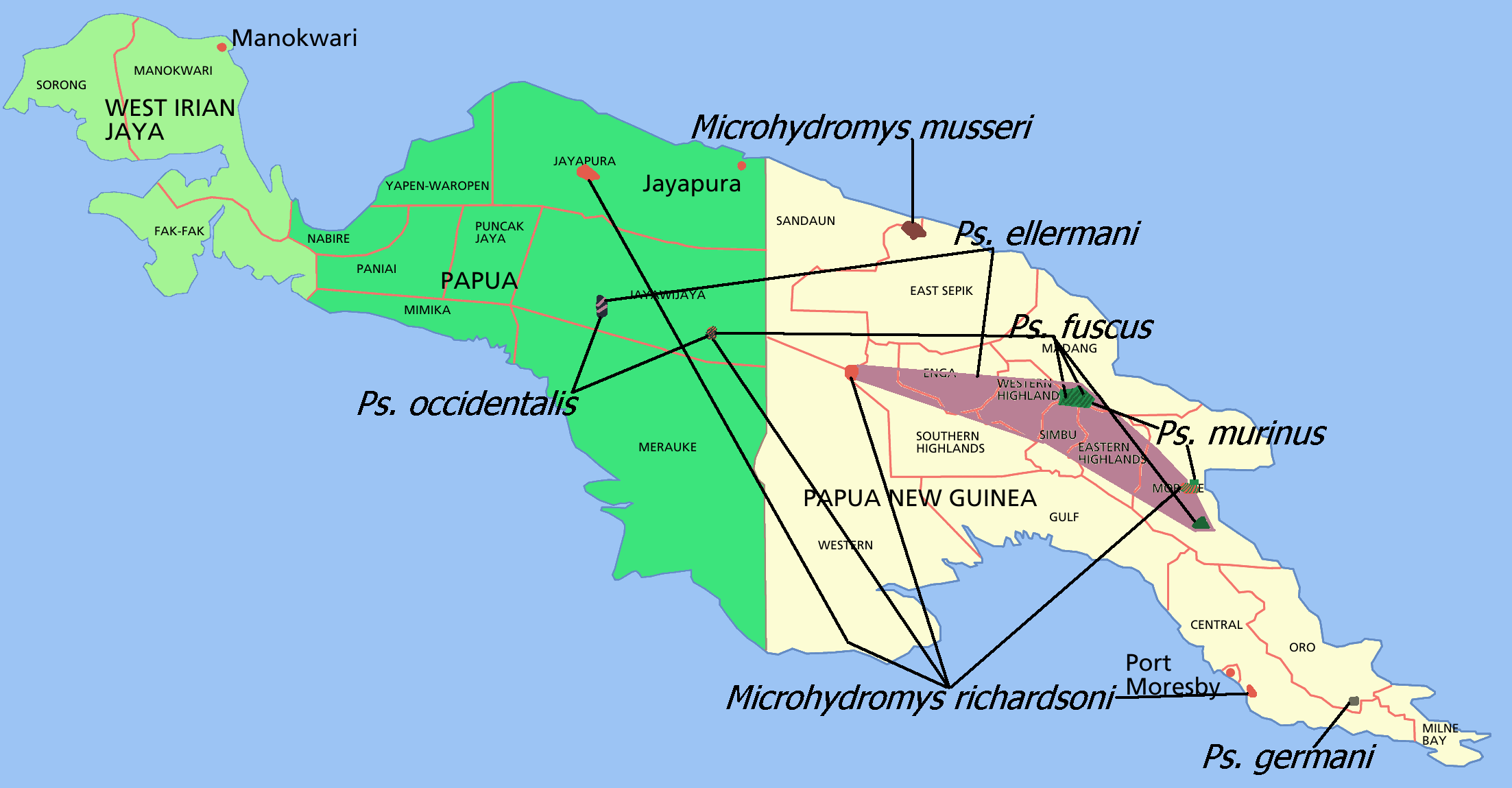
Distribution of the rodent genera Pseudohydromys (abbreviated to Ps.) and Microhydromys on New Guinea.

The mottled-tailed shrew mouse (Pseudohydromys fuscus) is a species of rodent in the family Muridae. It is found in West Papua, Indonesia and Papua New Guinea.
