= Pseudohydromys =

Scientific classification
- Kingdom: Animalia
- Phylum: Chordata
- Class: Mammalia
- Order: Rodentia
- Family: Muridae
- Tribe: Hydromyini
- Genus: Pseudohydromys; Rümmler, 1934

Type species
- Pseudohydromys murinus

Species
- Pseudohydromys berniceae Pseudohydromys carlae Pseudohydromys eleanorae Pseudohydromys ellermani Pseudohydromys fuscus Pseudohydromys germani Pseudohydromys murinus Pseudohydromys musseri Pseudohydromys occidentalis Pseudohydromys patriciae Pseudohydromys pumehanae Pseudohydromys sandrae

Synonyms
- Mayermys Laurie & Hill, 1954; Neohydromys Laurie, 1952

Genus of rodents

Pseudohydromys is a genus of rodents in the family Muridae endemic to New Guinea. It contains the following species:

- Bishop's moss mouse (Pseudohydromys berniceae)
- Huon small-toothed moss mouse (Pseudohydromys carlae)
- Laurie's moss mouse (Pseudohydromys eleanorae)
- One-toothed shrew mouse (Pseudohydromys ellermani)
- Mottled-tailed shrew mouse (Pseudohydromys fuscus)
- German's one-toothed moss mouse (Pseudohydromys germani)
- Eastern shrew mouse (Pseudohydromys murinus)
- Musser's shrew mouse (Pseudohydromys musseri)
- Western shrew mouse (Pseudohydromys occidentalis)
- Woolley's moss mouse (Pseudohydromys patriciae)
- Southern small-toothed moss mouse (Pseudohydromys pumehanae)
- White-bellied moss mouse (Pseudohydromys sandrae)

It was not until a 2009 revision that a general idea of the true taxonomic content of this genus was realized.
