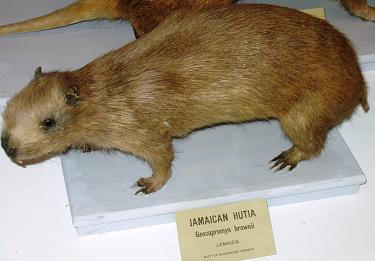
- Mounted specimen of Geocapromys brownii

Scientific classification
- Kingdom: Animalia
- Phylum: Chordata
- Class: Mammalia
- Order: Rodentia
- Family: Echimyidae
- Subfamily: Capromyinae
- Tribe: Capromyini
- Genus: Geocapromys; Chapman, 1901

Type species
- Capromys (Geocapromys) brownii J. Fischer, 1830

Species
- G. brownii G. ingrahami †G. caymanensis †G. columbianus †G. thoracatus
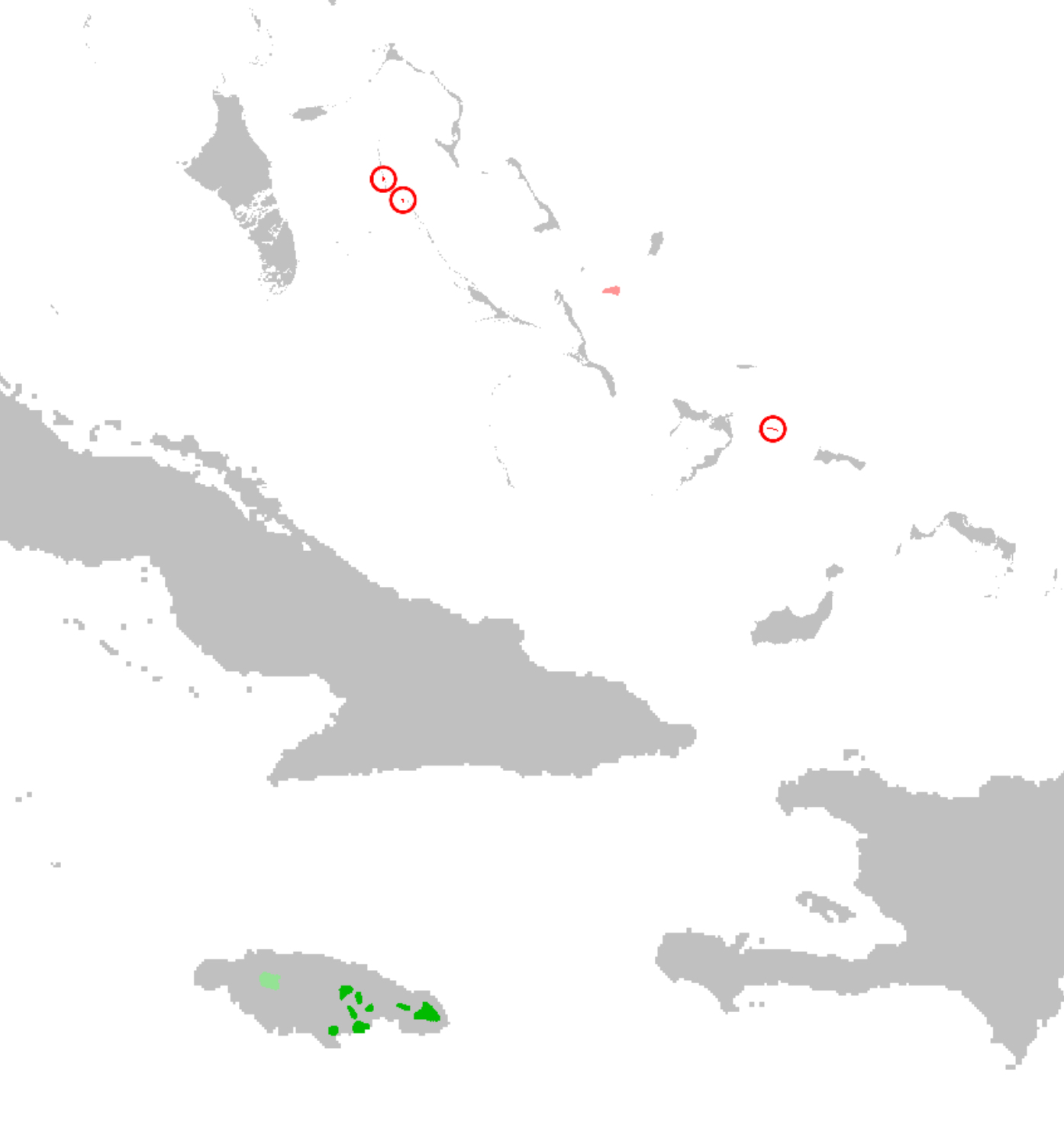
- Extant species of Geocapromys Red: extant range of Geocapromys ingrahami , Light red: possibly extant range of Geocapromys ingrahami , Green: extant range of Geocapromys brownii , Light green: possibly extant range of Geocapromys brownii

= Geocapromys =

Geocapromys Temporal range: Pleistocene to Recent

Genus of mammals belonging to the hutia subfamily of rodents

Geocapromys is a genus of rodent belonging to the hutia subfamily and are currently only found on the Bahamas and Jamaica. However, they formerly ranged throughout the Caribbean, from Cuba to the Cayman Islands to even islands off mainland Central America.

== Systematics ==
The genus Geocapromys comprises five recent species, three of which are extinct.

- G. brownii, the Jamaican hutia, which is also known as the Jamaican coney or Brown's hutia, is another extant species endemic to Jamaica.
- Geocapromys ingrahami, the Bahamian hutia or Ingraham's hutia, is an extant species of hutia native to the Bahamas.
- †G. thoracatus, the Little Swan Island hutia, was a third species which was found only on Little Swan Island, off northeastern Honduras. It became extinct in 1955, wiped out by storms and introduced predators. Some scientists consider it a subspecies of G. brownii.
- †G. columbianus, the Cuban coney, was endemic to Cuba, where it went extinct shortly after human colonization.
- †G. caymanensis, the Cayman hutia, was endemic to the Cayman Islands, where it went extinct shortly after human colonization.

In addition, there are two species, G. megas and G. pleistocenicus, which are known only from fossil remains.

== Phylogeny ==
Within Capromyidae, Geocapromys is the sister group to a clade comprising Mesocapromys and Mysateles on the one hand, and Capromys on the other hand. In turn, these four genera belong to the tribe Capromyini, and are the sister group to Plagiodontia.

Genus-level cladogram of the Capromyidae
with their relationship to Carterodon and Euryzygomatomyinae.

- Octodontoidea
  - Euryzygomatomyinae
    - Trinomys (Atlantic spiny rats)
    - - Clyomys
      - Euryzygomatomys (guiaras)
  - - Carterodon (Owl's spiny rat)
    - Capromyidae
      - Plagiodontini
        Plagiodontia
      - Capromyini
        - Geocapromys
        - - Capromys (Desmarest's hutia)
          - - Mesocapromys
            - Mysateles

The cladogram has been reconstructed from mitochondrial and nuclear DNA characters.
