= Western shrew mouse =

Conservation status
- Data Deficient (IUCN 3.1)

Scientific classification
- Kingdom: Animalia
- Phylum: Chordata
- Class: Mammalia
- Order: Rodentia
- Family: Muridae
- Genus: Pseudohydromys
- Species: P. occidentalis

Binomial name
- Pseudohydromys occidentalis Tate, 1951

Species of rodent

The western shrew mouse (Pseudohydromys occidentalis) is a species of rodent in the family Muridae. It is found in West Papua, Indonesia and Papua New Guinea.
