= New Guinean spiny bandicoot =

New Guinean spiny bandicoots

Scientific classification
- Domain: Eukaryota
- Kingdom: Animalia
- Phylum: Chordata
- Class: Mammalia
- Infraclass: Marsupialia
- Order: Peramelemorphia
- Family: Peramelidae
- Subfamily: Echymiperinae
- Genus: Echymipera; Lesson, 1842

Type species
- Perameles kalubu Fischer, 1829

Species
- Echymipera clara; Echymipera davidi; Echymipera echinista; Echymipera kalubu; Echymipera rufescens

Genus of marsupials

The New Guinean spiny bandicoots (genus Echymipera) are members of the order Peramelemorphia. They are found on New Guinea and nearby islands as well as on the Cape York Peninsula of Australia.

== Species ==
All Echymipera species are native to New Guinea. The common echymipera and long-nosed echymipera are also found on neighboring islands.

- Clara's echymipera (Echymipera clara)
- David's echymipera (Echymipera davidi)
- Menzies' echymipera (Echymipera echinista)
- Common echymipera (Echymipera kalubu)
- Long-nosed echymipera (Echymipera rufescens)
