= Geocapromys caymanensis =

Geocapromys caymanensis Temporal range: Quaternary

Scientific classification
- Kingdom: Animalia
- Phylum: Chordata
- Class: Mammalia
- Infraclass: Placentalia
- Order: Rodentia
- Family: Echimyidae
- Genus: Geocapromys
- Species: †G. caymanensis

Binomial name
- †Geocapromys caymanensis Morgan et al., 2019

Extinct species of mammal

Geocapromys caymanensis is an extinct species of Geocapromys that inhabited the Cayman Islands during the Quaternary period.
