= Southern small-toothed moss mouse =

Scientific classification
- Kingdom: Animalia
- Phylum: Chordata
- Class: Mammalia
- Order: Rodentia
- Family: Muridae
- Genus: Pseudohydromys
- Species: P. pumehanae

Binomial name
- Pseudohydromys pumehanae Helgen & Helgen, 2009

Species of rodent

The southern small-toothed moss mouse (Pseudohydromys pumehanae) is a species of rodent in the family Muridae found on the slopes of Mount Bosavi, Papua New Guinea.
