= Musser's shrew mouse =

Conservation status
- Data Deficient (IUCN 3.1)

Scientific classification
- Kingdom: Animalia
- Phylum: Chordata
- Class: Mammalia
- Order: Rodentia
- Family: Muridae
- Genus: Pseudohydromys
- Species: P. musseri

Binomial name
- Pseudohydromys musseri Flannery, 1989

Species of rodent

Musser's shrew mouse (Pseudohydromys musseri) is a species of rodent in the family Muridae. It is found only in Papua New Guinea. Its natural habitat is subtropical or tropical moist montane forests.
