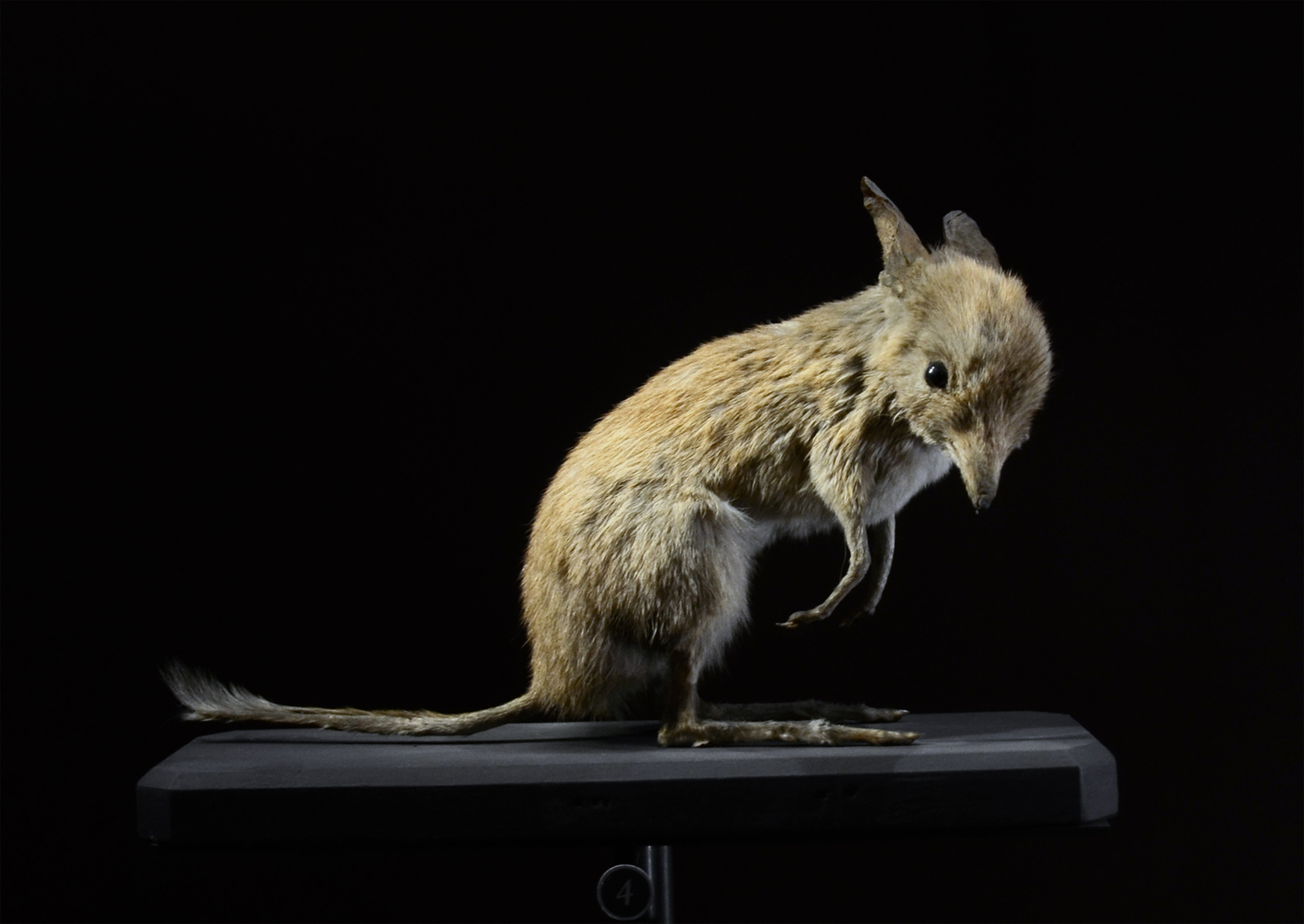

Conservation status
- Extinct (1950s) (IUCN 3.1)

Scientific classification
- Kingdom: Animalia
- Phylum: Chordata
- Class: Mammalia
- Infraclass: Marsupialia
- Order: Peramelemorphia
- Family: †Chaeropodidae
- Genus: †Chaeropus
- Species: †C. yirratji

Binomial name
- †Chaeropus yirratji Travouillon et al. 2019

= Northern pig-footed bandicoot =

Extinct species of marsupial

The northern pig-footed bandicoot (Chaeropus yirratji) was a small species of extinct herbivorous Australian marsupial in the genus Chaeropus, the pig-footed bandicoots. It has been believed to be extinct since the mid-20th century; the last confirmed observation was a specimen collected near Alice Springs in 1901, but reports from local Aborigines indicate that it may have survived in the Gibson and Great Sandy Deserts as late as the 1950s.

It very closely resembled and was formerly considered conspecific with the related southern pig-footed bandicoot, but unlike C. ecaudatus, C. yirratji was restricted to grassland habitats in the deserts of central and western Australia. It also had a longer tail and hind feet, a different dentition, fewer holes on its palate, and a distinct coat coloration. It had at least two different color morphs; a light morph and a dark morph. This species likely went extinct due to the introduction of invasive red foxes and feral cats, as well as habitat degradation for livestock.
