= Menzies' echymipera =

Conservation status
- Data Deficient (IUCN 3.1)

Scientific classification
- Kingdom: Animalia
- Phylum: Chordata
- Class: Mammalia
- Infraclass: Marsupialia
- Order: Peramelemorphia
- Family: Peramelidae
- Genus: Echymipera
- Species: E. echinista

Binomial name
- Echymipera echinista Menzies, 1990
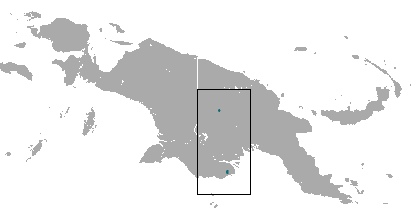
- Menzies' echymipera range

Species of marsupial

Menzies' echymipera (Echymipera echinista), or Menzies' spiny bandicoot or Fly River bandicoot, is a species of marsupial in the family Peramelidae. It is endemic to Papua New Guinea.
