= Eastern shrew mouse =

Conservation status
- Least Concern (IUCN 3.1)

Scientific classification
- Kingdom: Animalia
- Phylum: Chordata
- Class: Mammalia
- Order: Rodentia
- Family: Muridae
- Genus: Pseudohydromys
- Species: P. murinus

Binomial name
- Pseudohydromys murinus Rümmler, 1934

Species of rodent

The eastern shew mouse (Pseudohydromys murinus) is a species of rodent in the family Muridae. It is found only in Papua New Guinea.
