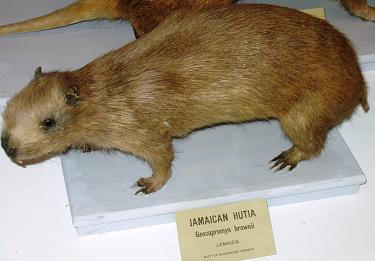

Conservation status
- Endangered (IUCN 3.1)

Scientific classification
- Kingdom: Animalia
- Phylum: Chordata
- Class: Mammalia
- Order: Rodentia
- Family: Echimyidae
- Genus: Geocapromys
- Species: G. brownii

Binomial name
- Geocapromys brownii (J. Fischer, 1829)
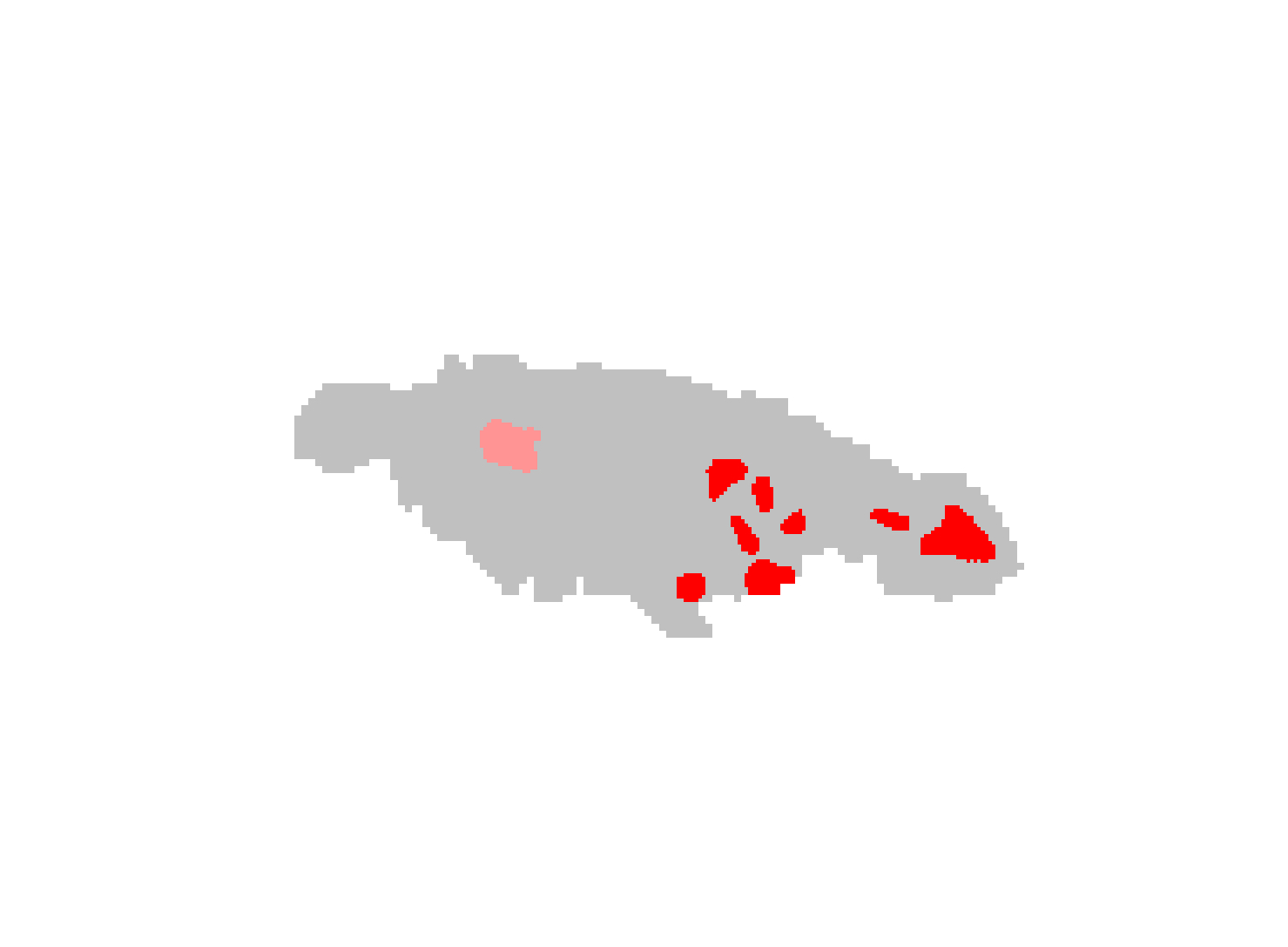

= Jamaican coney =

Hutia endemic to Jamaica

The Jamaican coney (Geocapromys brownii), also known as the Jamaican hutia or Brown's hutia, is a small, endangered, rat-like mammal found only on the island of Jamaica. About the size of a rabbit, it lives in group nests and is active at night to feed on fruit, bark, and other plant matter. It is currently endangered by habitat loss, hunting, and non-native species; it persists only in remote mountains. The Jamaican coney belongs to the hutia subfamily (Capromyinae) and is the only surviving native mammal on Jamaica other than bats.

== Description ==
The Jamaican coney is generally about the size of a cottontail rabbit, and mature adults usually weigh between 1 and 2 kg. It is reddish brown/yellowish brown in colour, and ranges in size from about 330 to 445 mm in length. It has the smallest tail of all the species in the genus (approximately 45mm). It has a large head (the largest in the genus), short legs, short tail, and short ears and neck. It has large, robust incisors and hypsodont cheekteeth.

== Distribution and habitat ==
G. brownii only occurs in Jamaica, mainly in the more remote locations and mountainous regions. They have been found from as far east as the John Crow and Blue Mountains of Portland and the St. Thomas Parishes in the east of the island, to as far west as the Harris Savannah and the Brazilletto Mountains in Clarendon Parish, Jamaica.

== Ecology and behaviour ==
Jamaican hutias are almost exclusively nocturnal mammals. As night foragers, they feed on a large variety of food sources, including fruits, exposed roots, bark, and the foliage from many different plant species. The IUCN has classified it as an endangered species.

Observations of captive specimens note that Jamaican hutias do not build their own nests. They have strong social interactions between related individuals, which can include mutual grooming, play, and soft vocalizations when not in physical contact which each other. They have a semi-plantigrade stance, and are excellent climbers and jumpers, often using their front incisors for grip and leverage.

== Reproduction ==
Little is known of how the Jamaican hutia reproduces in the wild, but observations from captive specimens show that the females reach maturity in about one year, while males tend to reach maturity at a somewhat older age. Females usually give birth and average of 2 litters per year, with about two offspring per litter. The average gestation period is 123 days. The young are born extremely precocial, and can walk at birth as well as eat adult foods within about 30 hours of birth.
