= Mouse bandicoot =

Conservation status
- Vulnerable (IUCN 3.1)

Scientific classification
- Kingdom: Animalia
- Phylum: Chordata
- Class: Mammalia
- Infraclass: Marsupialia
- Order: Peramelemorphia
- Family: Peramelidae
- Genus: Microperoryctes
- Species: M. murina

Binomial name
- Microperoryctes murina Stein, 1932
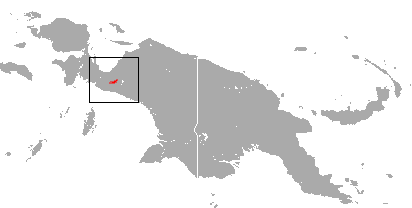
- Mouse bandicoot range

Species of marsupial

The mouse bandicoot (Microperoryctes murina) is a species of marsupial in the family Peramelidae. It is endemic to West Papua, Indonesia. Its natural habitat is subtropical or tropical dry forests.

It is suggested that M. murina has evolved and adapted to a lifestyle similar to that of small, insect- and worm-eating shrews and shrew-mice found in the highland forests of Southeast Asia and Melanesia because of its specific fur color (plain, smoky-grey) and texture (soft and woolly). Although little is known about the diet of other Microperoryctes species, the majority of bandicoots are generally considered omnivores.
