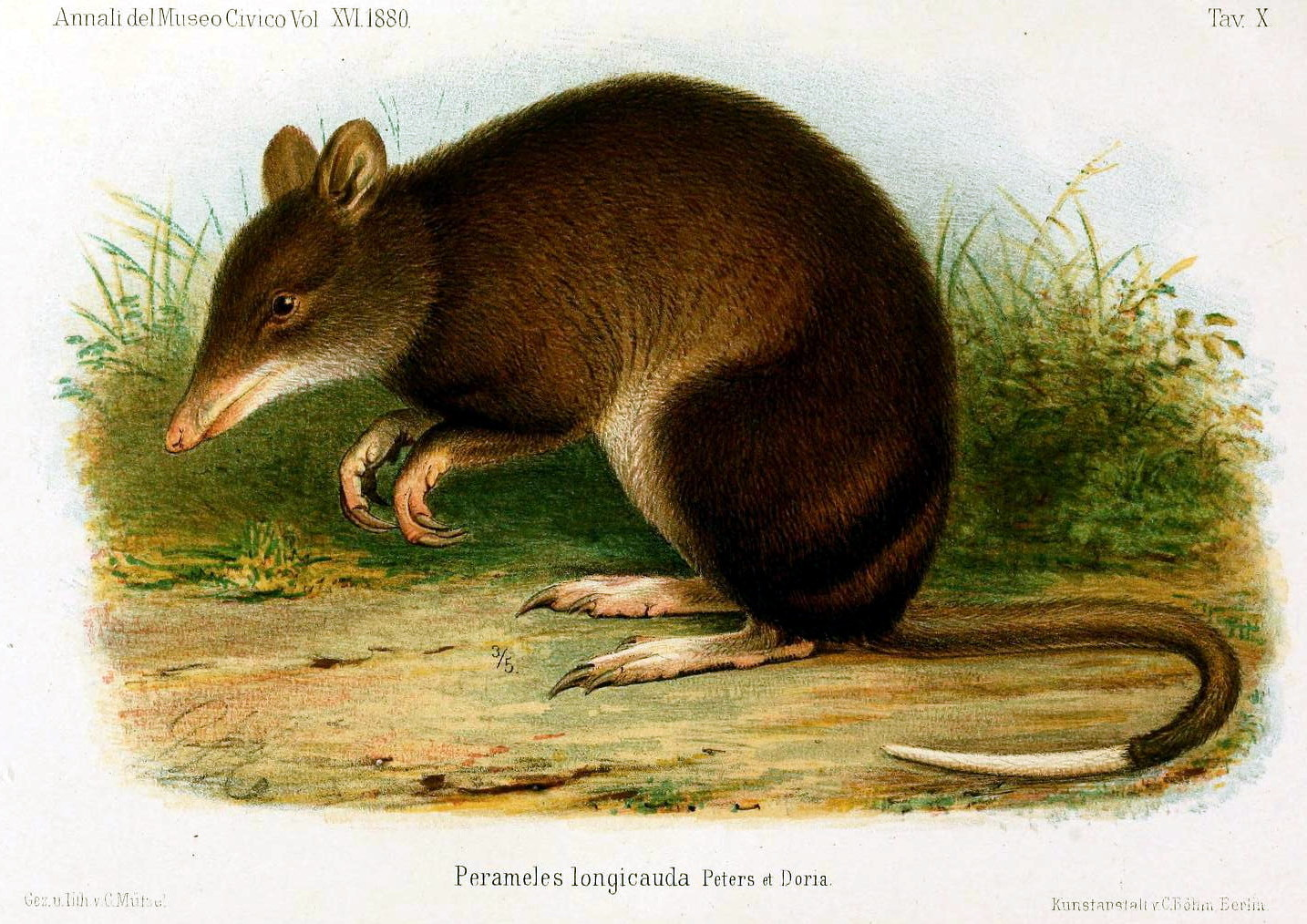
- Microperoryctes longicauda

Scientific classification
- Domain: Eukaryota
- Kingdom: Animalia
- Phylum: Chordata
- Class: Mammalia
- Infraclass: Marsupialia
- Order: Peramelemorphia
- Family: Peramelidae
- Subfamily: Echymiperinae
- Genus: Microperoryctes; Stein, 1932

Type species
- Microperoryctes murina Stein, 1932

Species
- M. aplini; M. longicauda; M. murina; M. ornata; M. papuensis

= New Guinean mouse bandicoot =

New Guinean mouse bandicoots

Genus of marsupials

The New Guinean mouse bandicoots (genus Microperoryctes) or striped bandicoots are members of the order Peramelemorphia. In addition to the named species, there are two currently undescribed members of this genus.

== Species ==
- Arfak pygmy bandicoot (Microperoryctes aplini)
- Striped bandicoot (Microperoryctes longicauda)
- Mouse bandicoot (Microperoryctes murina)
- Eastern striped bandicoot (Microperoryctes ornata)
- Papuan bandicoot (Microperoryctes papuensis)
