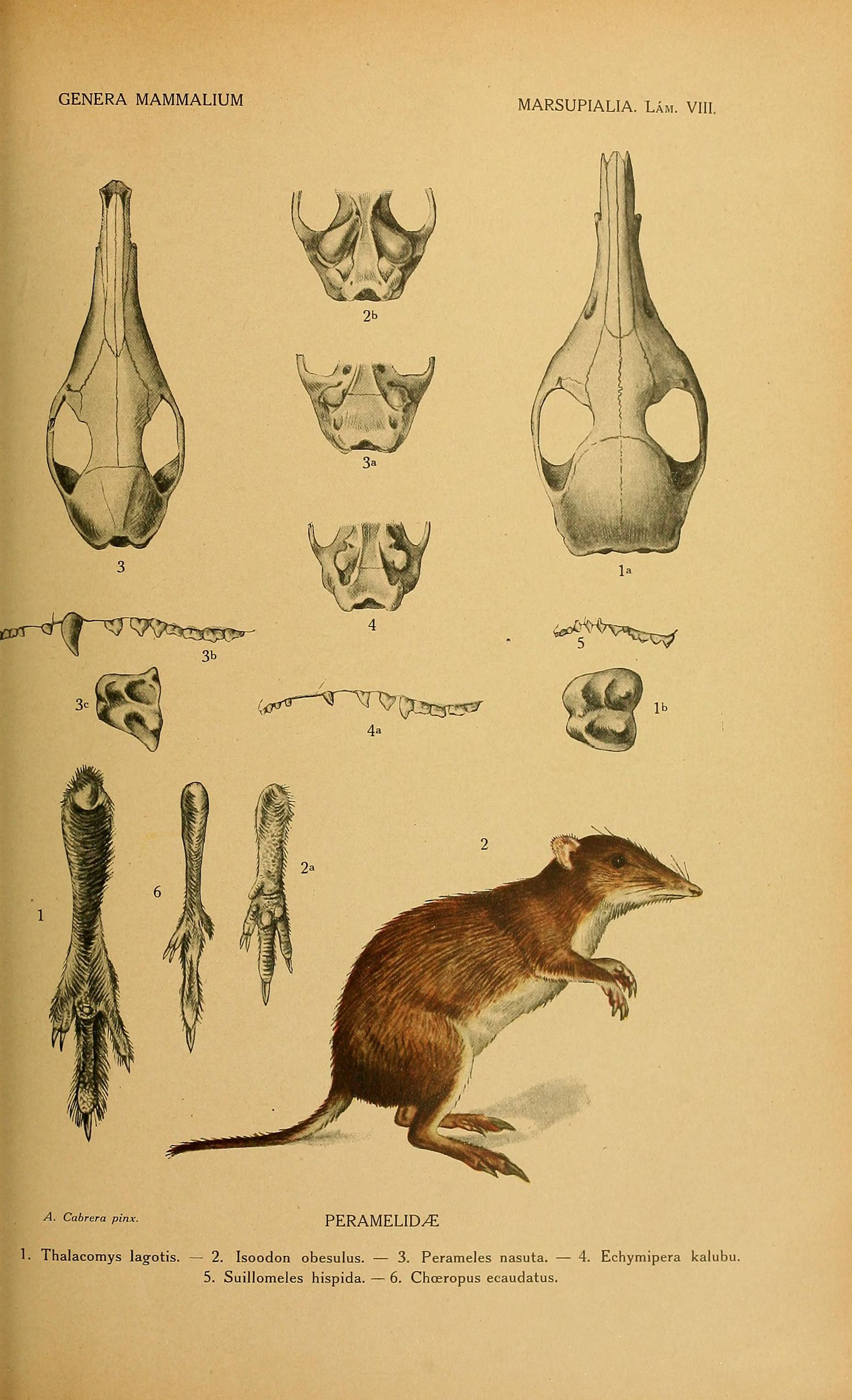

Conservation status
- Least Concern (IUCN 3.1)

Scientific classification
- Kingdom: Animalia
- Phylum: Chordata
- Class: Mammalia
- Infraclass: Marsupialia
- Order: Peramelemorphia
- Family: Peramelidae
- Genus: Echymipera
- Species: E. kalubu

Binomial name
- Echymipera kalubu (J. Fischer, 1829)
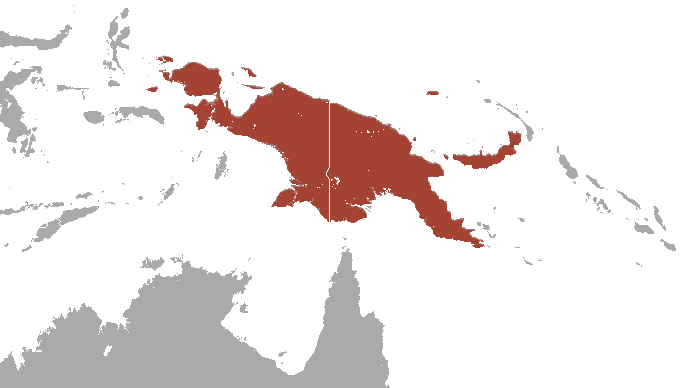
- Common echymipera range

= Common echymipera =

Species of marsupial

The common echymipera (Echymipera kalubu), or common spiny bandicoot, is a bandicoot. It is long-snouted even by bandicoot standards. The upper parts are a coarse reddish-brown, flecked with spiny buff and black hairs. The tail is short and almost hairless. Length varies between 30 and 40 cm (12 and 16 in), with the tail accounting for an additional 8 to 10 cm (3.1 to 3.9 in); the weight is from 0.6 to 2 kg (1.3 to 4.4 lb).

== Names ==
The name kalubu, from which the scientific name is derived, is from the Ma'ya language of the Raja Ampat Islands.

== Distribution ==
The common echymipera is native to New Guinea. Its presence in the Admiralty Islands is due to human introduction several thousand years ago, but not before 13,000 B.P. However, unlike Phalangeridae species (cuscus), which have historically been widely introduced and distributed by humans, the Peramelidae (bandicoots) have generally not been spread as much via human introductions.

It is hunted for human consumption in New Guinea. The Common echymipera is a host of the Acanthocephalan intestinal parasite Australiformis semoni.
