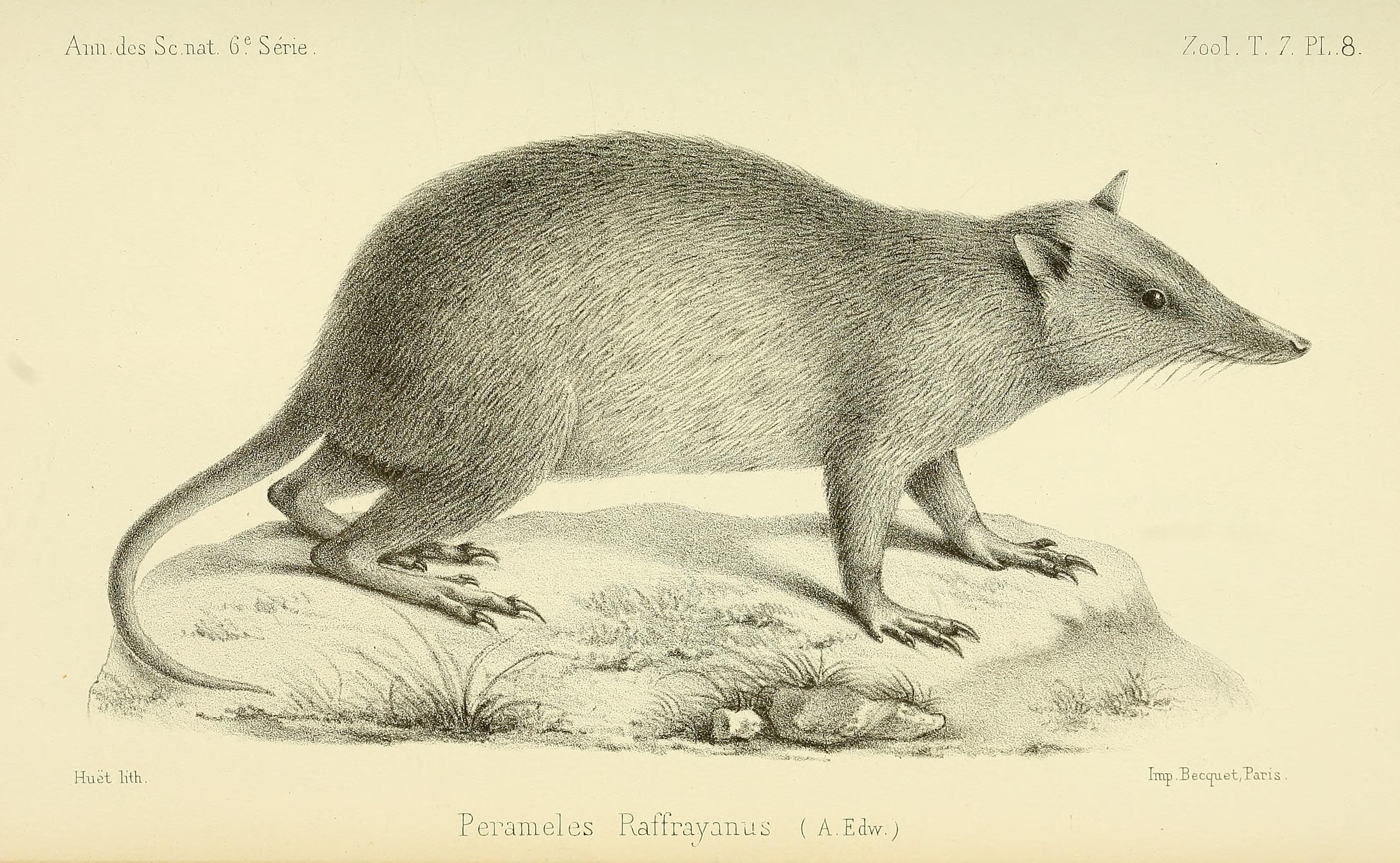

Conservation status
- Least Concern (IUCN 3.1)

Scientific classification
- Kingdom: Animalia
- Phylum: Chordata
- Class: Mammalia
- Infraclass: Marsupialia
- Order: Peramelemorphia
- Family: Peramelidae
- Genus: Peroryctes
- Species: P. raffrayana

Binomial name
- Peroryctes raffrayana (A. Milne-Edwards, 1878)
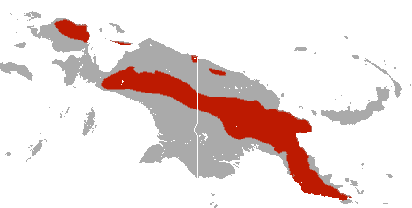
- Raffray's bandicoot range

= Raffray's bandicoot =

Species of marsupial

Raffray's bandicoot (Peroryctes raffrayana) is a species of marsupial in the family Peroryctidae. It is found in Indonesia and Papua New Guinea. Its natural habitat is subtropical or tropical dry forests.

It is known as pakam in the Kalam language of Papua New Guinea.
