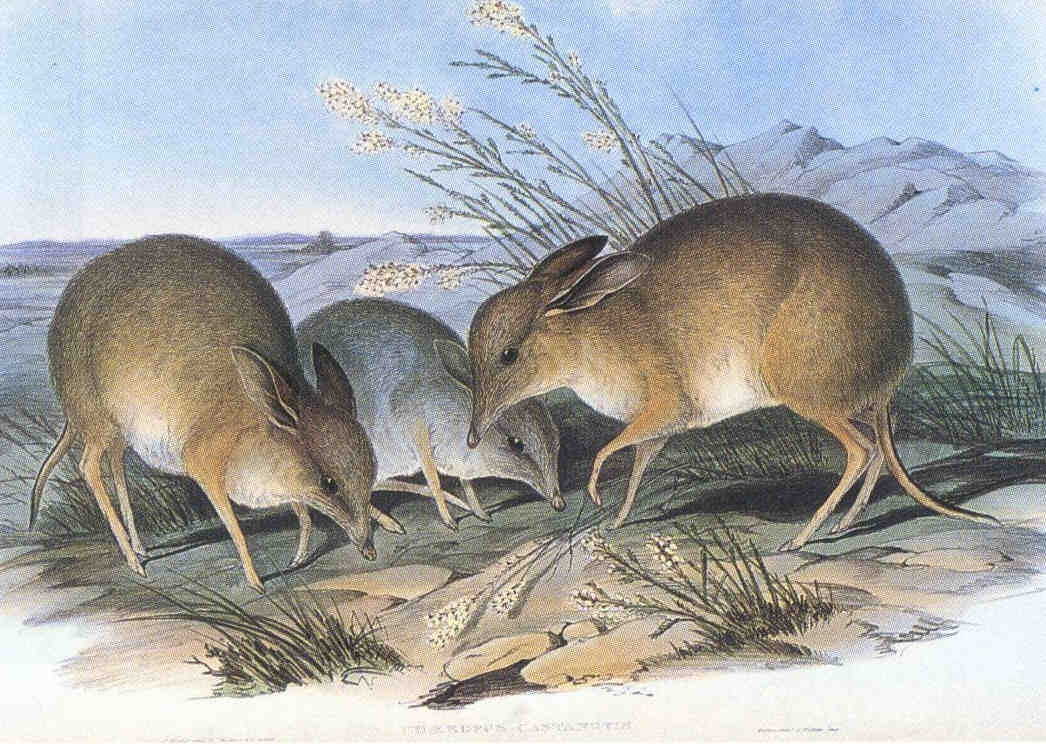
- 1857 illustration of two males and one female

Conservation status
- Extinct (1901) (IUCN 3.1)

Scientific classification
- Kingdom: Animalia
- Phylum: Chordata
- Class: Mammalia
- Infraclass: Marsupialia
- Order: Peramelemorphia
- Family: †Chaeropodidae
- Genus: †Chaeropus
- Species: †C. ecaudatus

Binomial name
- †Chaeropus ecaudatus (Ogilby, 1838)

Subspecies
- †C. ecaudatus ecaudatus Ogilby, 1838; †C. ecaudatus occidentalis Gould, 1845

Synonyms
- Chaeropus occidentalis Gould, 1845; Chaeropus castanotis J. E. Gray, 1842

= Southern pig-footed bandicoot =

Extinct species of mammal

The southern pig-footed bandicoot (Chaeropus ecaudatus) was a small species of herbivorous marsupial in the genus Chaeropus, the pig-footed bandicoots.

== Taxonomy ==
The type specimen was procured by Thomas Mitchell on the southern (Victorian) bank of the Murray River near where it is joined by the Murrumbidgee River – probably in late May 1836, a few days before the Mount Dispersion massacre. The tail had accidentally been broken off in the study skin, but this only was understood after some time. The original description, by London-based naturalist William Ogilby in 1838, assumed the lack of a tail to be genuine and consequently named the species ecaudatus "tailless"; for several years explorers thus sought out specimens of a tail-less bandicoot with unusual feet, which were duly procured by natives. Ultimately, it was understood that these additional specimens had their tails removed too, because the Westerners seemed to request it.

For much of the 20th century and some years beyond, it was assumed that all pig-footed bandicoots belonged to a single variable species C.ecaudatus; usually not even subspecies were recognized. The description of the population was revised in 2019, separating a central western population as Chaeropus yirratji and revalidating the two earlier descriptions as subspecies Chaeropus ecaudatus ecaudatus (southeastern Australia) and Chaeropus ecaudatus occidentalis (western and southwestern Australia).

== Description ==
It has been believed to be extinct since the early 20th century, having reportedly vanished from its final refuge in southern Australia by 1901. It was presumably the first of the two species of Chaeropus to go extinct. Pig footed-bandicoots were the only marsupials to walk on reduced digits both on the fore and hind feet. In addition, the pig footed-bandicoot diverges from two different species. According to molecular phylogenetic analyses they diverged from other bandicoots like the Peramelidae, and also from the bilbies like Thylacomyidae in the mid-Late Oligocene.

It is thought to have been distributed in shrubland habitats in the southern regions of Australia's deserts, and its range likely extended to Western Australia. It physically closely resembled the northern pig-footed bandicoot (C. yirratji), but it had fewer holes on its palate and shorter feet. It also had a different dentition than C. yirratji, indicating that it may have had a different diet. C. ecaudatus rapidly adapted to drying conditions and changing environment, quickly becoming a grazer in a short period of time C. ecaudatus is thought to have undergone rapid herbivorous evolution due to lesser high crown and lateral blade development on the lower molars found in an ancestral species, Chaeropus baynesi. The two species were formerly considered conspecific until a study released in 2019 found them to be separate species. This species likely went extinct due to predation by introduced red foxes and feral cats, as well as habitat degradation by introduced livestock.
