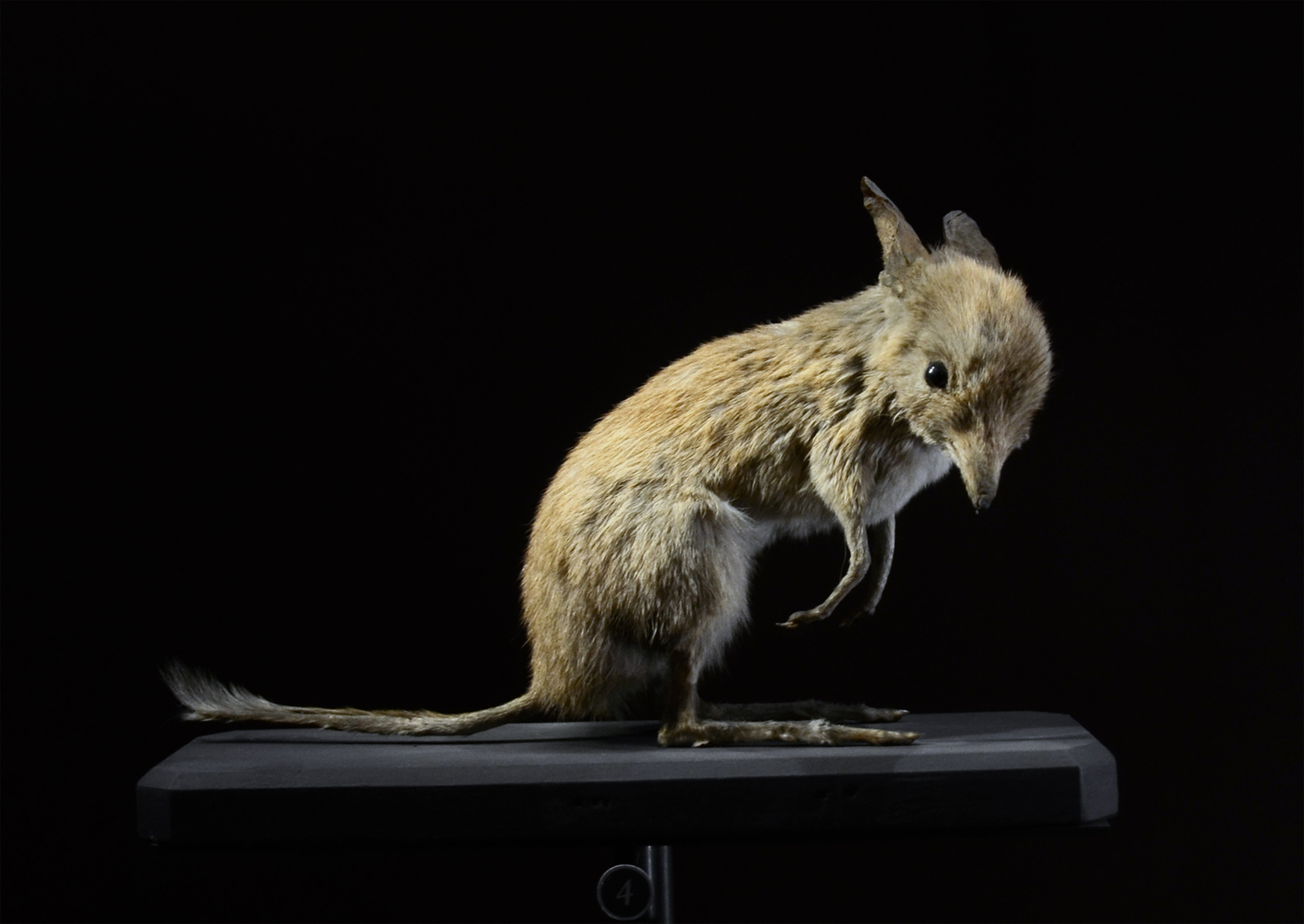
- C. yirratji specimen, Grande galerie de l'évolution

Scientific classification
- Kingdom: Animalia
- Phylum: Chordata
- Class: Mammalia
- Infraclass: Marsupialia
- Order: Peramelemorphia
- Family: †Chaeropodidae; Gill, 1872
- Genus: †Chaeropus; Ogilby, 1838

Type species
- Perameles ecaudatus Ogilby, 1838

Species
- Chaeropus ecaudatus; Chaeropus yirratji; Chaeropus baynesi (fossil)
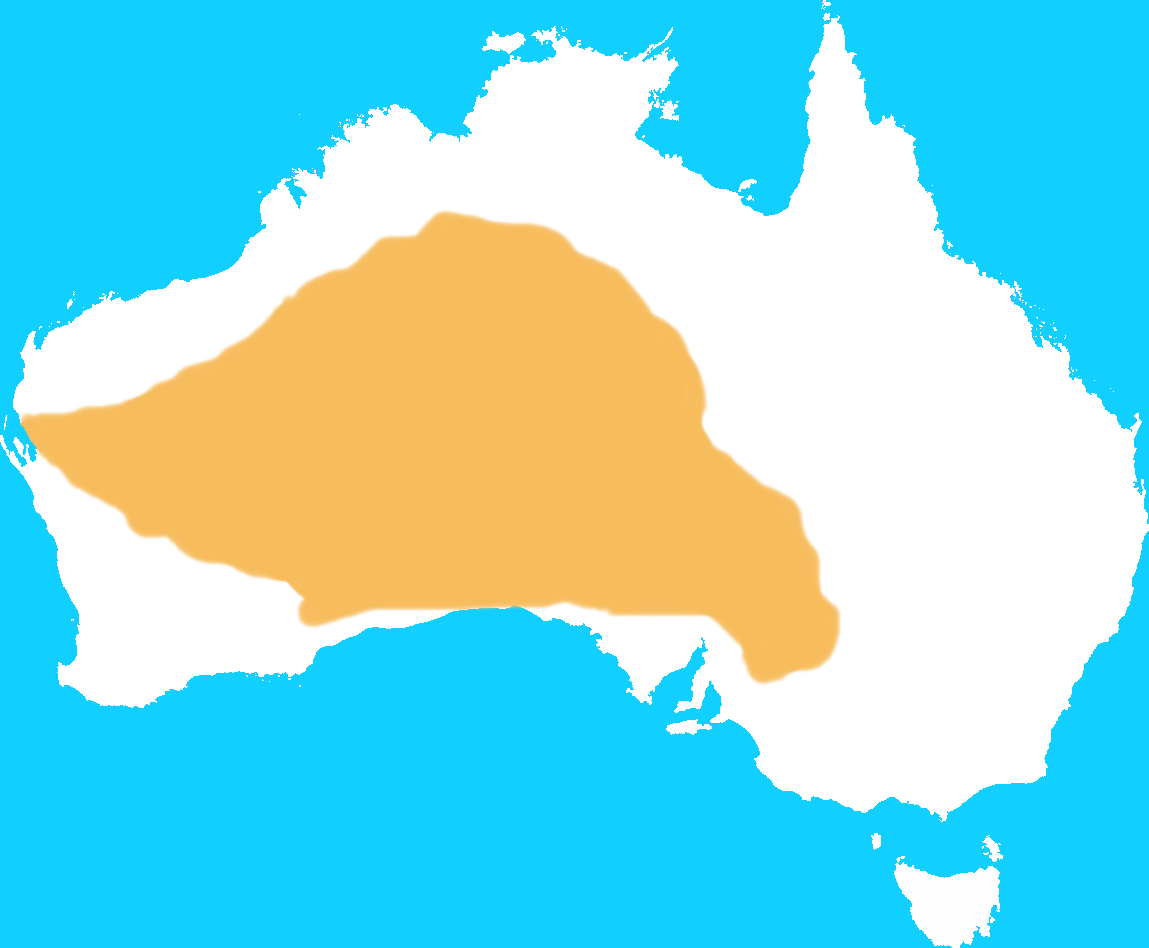
- Historic pig-footed bandicoot range in orange

= Chaeropus =

Pig-footed bandicoot Temporal range: Late Pliocene or Early Pleistocene–recent

Extinct genus of marsupials

Chaeropus, known as the pig-footed bandicoots, is a genus of small marsupials that became extinct during the 20th century. They were the only members of the family Chaeropodidae in order Peramelemorphia (bandicoots and bilbies), with unusually thin legs, yet were able to move rapidly. Two recognised species inhabited dense vegetation on the arid and semiarid plains of Australia. The genus' distribution range was later reduced to an inland desert region, where it was last recorded in the 1950s; it is now presumed extinct.

== Taxonomy ==
The genus was proposed by William Ogilby in a presentation to the Linnean Society of London of a new species tentatively assigned to a genus of bandicoots, the long-nosed Perameles, and was forwarded to John Gould, then at Sydney, for a more detailed examination. Ogilby submitted a drawing by collector Major Mitchell, who also supplied extensive remarks on the animal's form and habits, and identified the unusual pig-like toes of the forelimbs as the basis for a new genus. The collection of the specimen was made at the interior of New South Wales by Mitchell, on the banks of the Murray River.

The genus name Chaeropus combines terms from Ancient Greek for "pig" and "foot", a reference to the unique characteristic of the forelimbs noted by the describing author. The specific epithet ecaudatus refers to the absence of a tail, which the single specimen happened to be missing, leading to the unfortunate suggestion by the name that the marsupial did not possess them.

The recognised synonymy of the genus was published by Theodore S. Palmer in 1904. A nomenclatural synonym, Chœropus [Choeropus] Waterhouse, G.R. 1841, was published several years after Ogilby as an unjustified emendation; Waterhouse gives the spelling proposed by Ogilby in the same work. Oldfield Thomas noted the inappropriate epithet ecaudatus in 1888, substituting the name Chœropus castanotis proposed by John Edward Gray as the type of the genus, but this was suppressed as a synonym by Palmer.

The vernacular description, pig-footed bandicoot, was given by Ogilby in his first description, a name ascribed by Mitchell's party. Europeans settlers reported the species as resembling "small antelopes", a simile that was reported by Bernard Woodward as persisting until their disappearance around 1900. The names recorded from the Noongar language are boda, woda, and boodal. According to Indigenous Australian trackers, the pig-footed bandicoot was known as landwang and tubaija in their culture.

=== Classification ===
This genus was previously placed in the family Peramelidae, along with the bilbies, as the subfamily Chaeropodinae by McKenna and Bell (1997). However, its form is quite distinct, and recent molecular evidence supports this distinction. It is believed to be the sister group of the rest of the Peramelemorphia, and has been assigned to its own family, the Chaeropodidae. The divergence of Chaeropus from other members of the Peramelemorphia is estimated to be in the Mid-Late Oligocene, around 26.7 Mya (21.9–31.3 confidence interval).

Until 2019, both species were grouped under C. ecaudatus as the pig-footed bandicoot; however, a 2019 study split the genus into two species - the northern pig-footed bandicoot (C. yirratji) and the southern pig-footed bandicoot (C. ecaudatus). In 2016, a fossil species C. baynesi was described from Late Pliocene to Early Pleistocene (2.47–2.92 Mya) of south-west New South Wales.

The arrangement within the Marsupialia, with the treatment proposed in the 2019 revision, may be summarised as:

- Peramelemorphia

- Thylacomyidae (Macrotis, the bilbies)
- Chaeropodidae

- Chaeropus

- Chaeropus ecaudatus

- Chaeropus ecaudatus ecaudatus
- Chaeropus ecaudatus occidentalis

- Chaeropus yirratji

- Peramelidae (extant genera known as bandicoots)

== Description ==
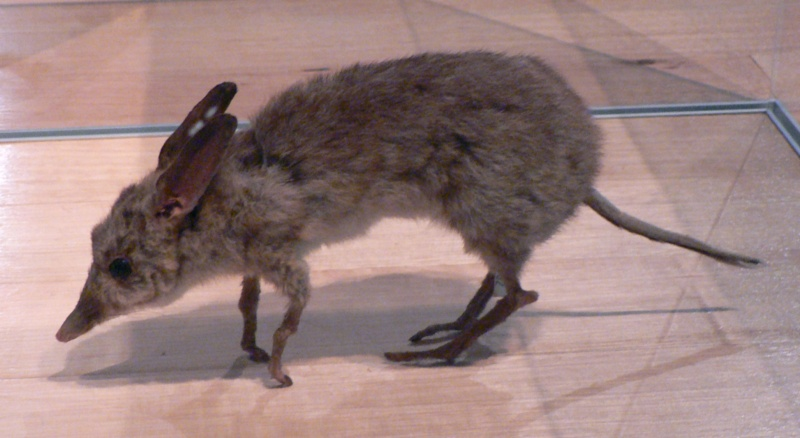
Taxidermied specimen at Melbourne Museum

A genus of Peramelemorphia order of marsupials, allied by a monophyletic family, and regarded as exceptional in their morphology. The direct evidence of the two species is limited to 29 specimens remaining at museums in Australia and overseas. Their superficial appearance resembled the native bandicoots or rat kangaroos, although very small and dainty, and comparable to the size of a young rabbit or kitten.

The feet of forelimbs resemble those of the genus Sus and the hind legs seen as similar to a horse. The species had a body size of 23–26 cm (9.1–10.2 in) and a 10–15 cm (3.9–5.9 in) tail. In form, they were almost bilby-like on first sight, having long, slender limbs, large, pointed ears, and a long tail. On closer examination, however, it became apparent that the pig-footed bandicoots were very unusual for marsupials. The forefeet had two functional toes with hooves, similar to the cloven hoof of a pig or deer; this is possibly due to juveniles being deposited in the pouch through external stalks, thus relieving them of using the forelimbs while as joeys. The hind feet had an enlarged fourth toe with a heavy claw shaped like a tiny horse's hoof, with the other toes being vestigial; only the fused second and third toes were useful, and that not for locomotion, but grooming.

They had broad heads, and a long yet slender snout. Their fur was coarse and straight, but not spiny. In color, they varied from grizzled grey through fawn to orange-brown, and the belly and underparts were white with the fur on the ears being of chestnut color.

The genus had five pairs of upper and three pairs of lower incisor teeth; tooth shape differed between the two species. The females of the genus had eight nipples and the opening of the pouch was faced backwards, not forwards as is the case with kangaroos.

Depictions of the species include a lithograph by Henry C. Richter in John Gould's Mammals of Australia, published in the mid-19th century. An unpublished illustration by Richter, under the direction of Gould, was discovered in the archives of Knowsley Hall, at one time home to a great patron of natural history, the Earl of Derby. The species C. ecaudatus was selected by Peter Schouten and Tim Flannery for a series of paintings illustrating the known information on the species' appearance and habits, published in a book surveying the modern extinctions of animals. Another reconstruction of the genus was produced by Schouten to illustrate the species C. yirratji.

== Distribution and habitat ==
The two species were native to western New South Wales and Victoria, the southern part of the Northern Territory and South Australia and Western Australia. Chaeropus ecaudatus populated semiarid southern regions of southern Australia, extending to southwest Australia, while C. yirratji populated sandy environments extending from Western Australia to the deserts in central Australia. They inhabited a wide range of habitat types, from grassy woodland and grassland plains to the spinifex country and arid flats of central Australia. Despite its wide range, the genus had a sparse distribution and was never abundant.

The number of complete specimens found in museum collections is 29. Historical records of collections in central and western Australia, where it was sometimes locally common, begin with a specimen obtained at the Peron Peninsula during the Uranie expedition led by Louis de Freycinet in 1818. John Gilbert recorded his observations at dense stands of Casuarina seedlings (Allocasuarina species) at the interior of the southwest, beyond Northam, but did not appear in the Avon valley, inland from the new colony at Perth, at new settlements near Toodyay, York, and the Wongan Hills area. On his second collecting expedition in the southwest he recorded the species at King George Sound, on the southern coast of Western Australia. The species was not recorded in the lists produced by the Austin Expedition of 1854, although W. A. Sanford was informed of a frequently seen animal, described as the "chestnut-eared hog's-foot", which Ludwig Glauert suggests was too common to merit notice in Austin's published report. Despite actively searching and collecting information on this animal, the species was not recorded by John Tunney, George Masters, or Guy Shortridge in their extensive surveys of western regions during the subsequent decades. The last record of Chaeropus in the Southwest Australian region was in 1898, at Youndegin, consistent with the disappearance of species in a critical weight range that succumbed to Australia's mammalian faunal collapse (1875–1925).

Archaeological evidence of the genus shows a greater range during Holocene and the earlier Pleistocene epoch. Specimens were uncovered in the first examination of fossil deposits at Mammoth Cave (Western Australia), at the beginning of the twentieth century, and great extension of the known range to eastern Queensland at two sites examined a century later. The appearance in the fossil fauna of eastern Queensland sites demonstrates the replacement of rainforest communities with the open grassy habitat favoured by this genus during the later Pleistocene. A survey of mammal fauna in the northeast of South Australia uncovered a fragment in an owl pellet buried beneath sediments.

Explorer Samuel Albert White was shown the tracks of the animal in 1921 and gained information on its habitat, being found on stony tablelands or at sand dunes in central Australia, and was able to capture one with the assistance of a local Aboriginal woman and her dogs. The increasing rarity of the animal had it included on a list of prohibited exports, either live or skin, issued by the federal government in 1921.

=== Extinction ===
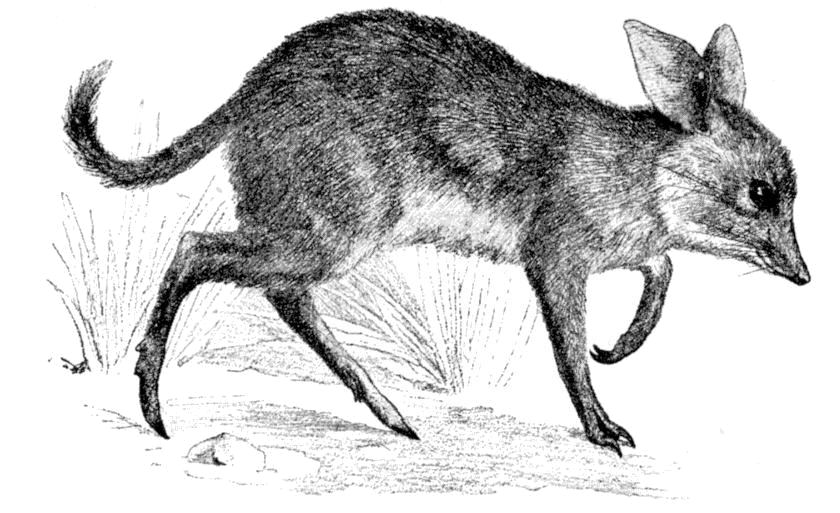
A 1902 illustration

According to Indigenous Australian oral tradition, pig-footed bandicoots were rare even before the arrival of Europeans on the continent, and were in a serious decline even as it first came to scientific notice in the middle years of the 19th century. Two specimens of pig-footed bandicoots were obtained by local people in 1857 for Gerard Krefft, who accompanied the Blandowski Expedition. In trying to communicate the species he sought, Krefft showed a drawing to his collectors that showed the absence of a tail; the first specimens he was supplied were bandicoots with the tails removed. Despite the trouble taken in gaining living specimens, Krefft recorded his observations with an apology for eating one of them. Only a handful of specimens was collected through the second part of the 19th century, mostly from northwestern Victoria, but also from arid country in South Australia, Western Australia, and the Northern Territory. By the start of the 20th century, they had become extinct in Victoria and the south-west of Western Australia. The last certain specimen was collected in 1901. By 1945, C. ecaudatus was extinct, having vanished from South Australia, and C. yirratji was reported to be limited to "a slight foothold in central Australia". Nevertheless, Aboriginal people report that C. yirratji survived as late as the 1950s in the Gibson Desert and the Great Sandy Desert of Western Australia.

The cause of the extinction remains uncertain; neither of the two most destructive introduced exterminator species, the red fox and the European rabbit, had yet arrived in south-west Western Australia when the pig-footed bandicoots disappeared from that area. Feral cats were already common, which may offer an explanation; perhaps more likely, the decline was caused by a double habitat change. Firstly, the end of many thousands of years of Aboriginal burning, which being confined to a patchwork of small areas at any one time, had ensured both fresh new growth in the recently burnt areas and adjacent older growth for shelter and as a base for recolonisation. Australia's Aboriginal population had declined by around 90% during the 19th century, largely because of the introduction of European diseases, and the remaining Aboriginal people were often no longer permitted to carry on their traditional land-management and hunting practices. Secondly, following on the heels of the near-extermination of the Aboriginal people, came the introduction of vast numbers of sheep and cattle, leading to significant changes in soil structure, plant growth, and food availability.

The species was included in historical modelling of a disease outbreak, a theorised epizootic that was the primary cause of mammalian declines, to which the populations of Chaeropus would seem to have been highly susceptible. The sudden demise of these marsupials was noted by Hal Colebatch, writing in 1929 that the disappearance was not the result of direct actions of settlers, but an unexplained consequence of a natural event. The apparent resilience of some mammals at Kellerberrin, which reappeared after a localised collapse, did not include this genus. When modelled as a primary factor in their demise, which has no discernible secondary factors, the population had no immunity to the hypothetical epizootic.

An ethnographic survey of Aboriginal informants from central Australia in 1988 found the animal has not been seen in southern regions for around 70 years, but had persisted in the central desert regions until 30–50 years earlier.

== Behaviour and ecology ==
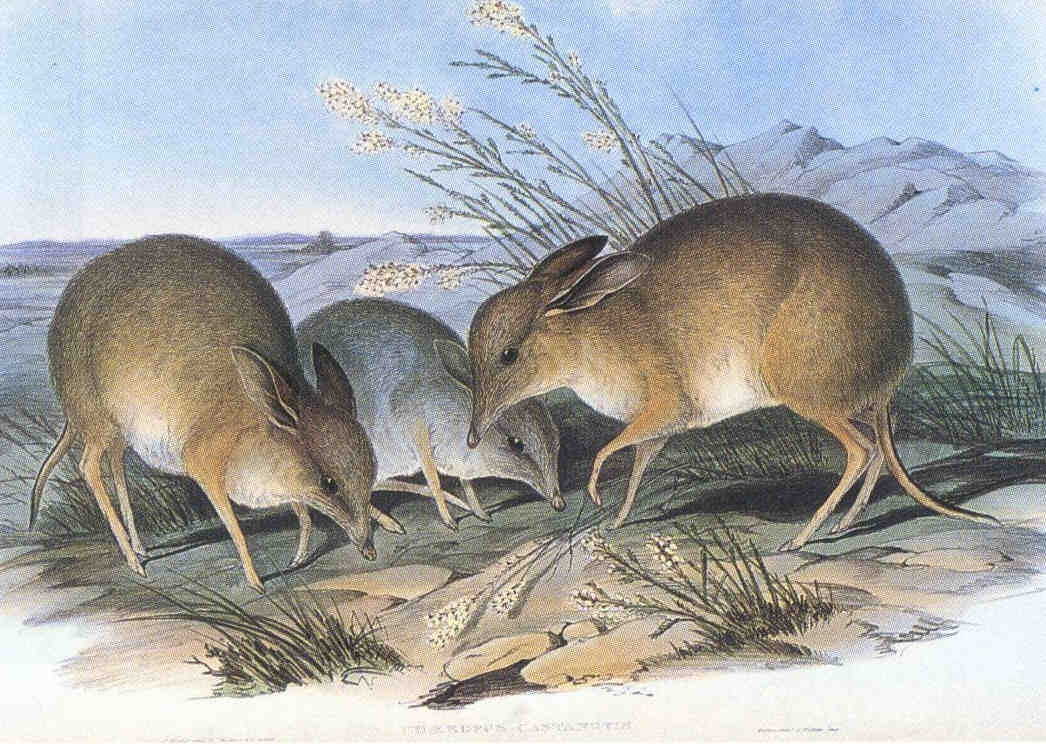
Illustration in Gould's Mammals of Australia

Few naturalists had the opportunity to observe and document the behaviour of the two species, with one of the few existing accounts suggesting that it moved "like a broken-down hack in a canter, apparently dragging the hind quarters after it". This is contradicted by the Aboriginal people of central Australia, who knew it well and reported that if disturbed, it was capable of running with considerable speed by breaking into a smooth, galloping sprint.

Chaeropus species moved with a distinctive gait, exaggerated by their proportionally long and slender limbs that resemble a large grazing mammal like the African antelope. Each forelimb had two functional toes and the rear limb ending in a hoof-like toe, with an apparent advantage when used to quickly evade a perceived threat. They were solitary, nocturnal animals that would sleep in their shelter during the day and emerge in the evening to feed, using their keen sense of smell to find food. Depending on the habitat, pig-footed bandicoots used a variety of shelters to hide from predators and for sleeping. John Gilbert found a nest site near Northam, Western Australia, that he described as greatly resembling those made by quenda and marl, but with more leaves. In wooded areas and grasslands, these ranged from hollow logs to nests made out of grass, while in arid, treeless country, this animal dug short, straight burrows with a nest at the end.

From surviving eyewitness reports and analyses of gut contents, dentition, and gut structure of museum specimens, pig-footed bandicoots apparently were the most herbivorous of the peramelemorphs; analysis based on dental morphology and tooth wear are consistent with a predominately plant-based diet. While captive specimens were fond of meat, and Aboriginal people reported that they ate grasshoppers, ants, and termites, the bulk of their diet was almost certainly leaves, roots, and grasses. In captivity, they drank "a good deal of water".

Tim Flannery suggests that breeding occurred between May and June and that twins may have been the norm for this species. From the size of its pouch and comparison with other marsupials of this size, pig-footed bandicoots likely did not carry more than four young per litter. Correspondence to Ludwig Glauert, reporting its disappearance some decades earlier, suggested that the animal was extremely delicate and would die if caught and mishandled.
