= Clara's echymipera =

Conservation status
- Least Concern (IUCN 3.1)

Scientific classification
- Kingdom: Animalia
- Phylum: Chordata
- Class: Mammalia
- Infraclass: Marsupialia
- Order: Peramelemorphia
- Family: Peramelidae
- Genus: Echymipera
- Species: E. clara

Binomial name
- Echymipera clara Stein, 1932
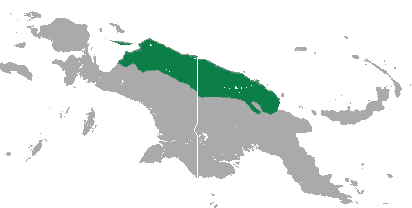
- Clara's echymipera range

Species of marsupial

Clara's echymipera (Echymipera clara), or Clara's spiny bandicoot or white-lipped bandicoot, is a species of marsupial in the family Peramelidae. It is found in West Papua, Indonesia and Papua New Guinea. Its natural habitat is subtropical or tropical dry forests.

It is hunted for human consumption in New Guinea.
