= Eleanor Mary Ord Laurie =

British mammalogist

Eleanor Mary Ord Laurie Isserlis (14 January 1919 - 17 March 2009) was a British mammalogist.

== Early life ==
Laurie was born in 1919 to parents Elinor Beatrice Ord and Robert Douglas Laurie. Her father was head of the Zoology Department at Aberystwyth University from 1918 until his retirement in 1940.

== Education and career ==
Laurie was the head of the Mammal Department at the British Museum of Natural History. She graduated from St Hugh's College, Oxford in 1942 with a Master of Science degree. In its 1949–1950 issue, the St Hugh's College Chronicle noted that she was appointed Senior Scientific Officer at the British Museum in its Zoology Department. She became a Fellow of the Linnean Society of London in 1950; she withdrew from the Society in 1958.

=== Species described ===
Laurie described a number of new mammal species, including:

- Dactylopsila tatei Laurie, 1952
- Microperoryctes papuensis (Laurie, 1952)
- Hipposideros inexpectatus Laurie & Hill, 1954
- Miniopterus shortridgei Laurie & Hill, 1956

=== Selected publications ===
- Laurie, E. M.; Hill, J. E. (1954). List of land mammals of New Guinea, Celebes and adjacent islands 1758-1952. Trustees of the British Museum.
- Laurie, E. M. O. (1946). "The reproduction of the house-mouse (Mus musculus) living in different environments". Proceedings of the Royal Society of London. Series B: Biological Sciences. 133 (872): 248–281. Bibcode:1946RSPSB.133..248L. doi:10.1098/rspb.1946.0012. PMID 20994890.
- Southern, H. N.; Laurie, E. M. O. (1946). "The House-Mouse (Mus musculus) in Corn Ricks". The Journal of Animal Ecology. 15 (2): 134. doi:10.2307/1554. JSTOR 1554.
- Laurie, E. M. O. (1946). "The Coypu (Myocastor coypus) in Great Britain". The Journal of Animal Ecology. 15 (1): 22–34. doi:10.2307/1622. JSTOR 1622.

== Personal life ==
On 29 December 1949, she married Alexander Isserlis, who would become Principal Private Secretary to the Prime Minister in 1970. Together, they had two daughters.

== Honours ==
In 2009, Helgen and Helgen named a new species of mouse after Laurie, Pseudohydromys eleanorae, recommending the common name of Laurie's moss mouse.
