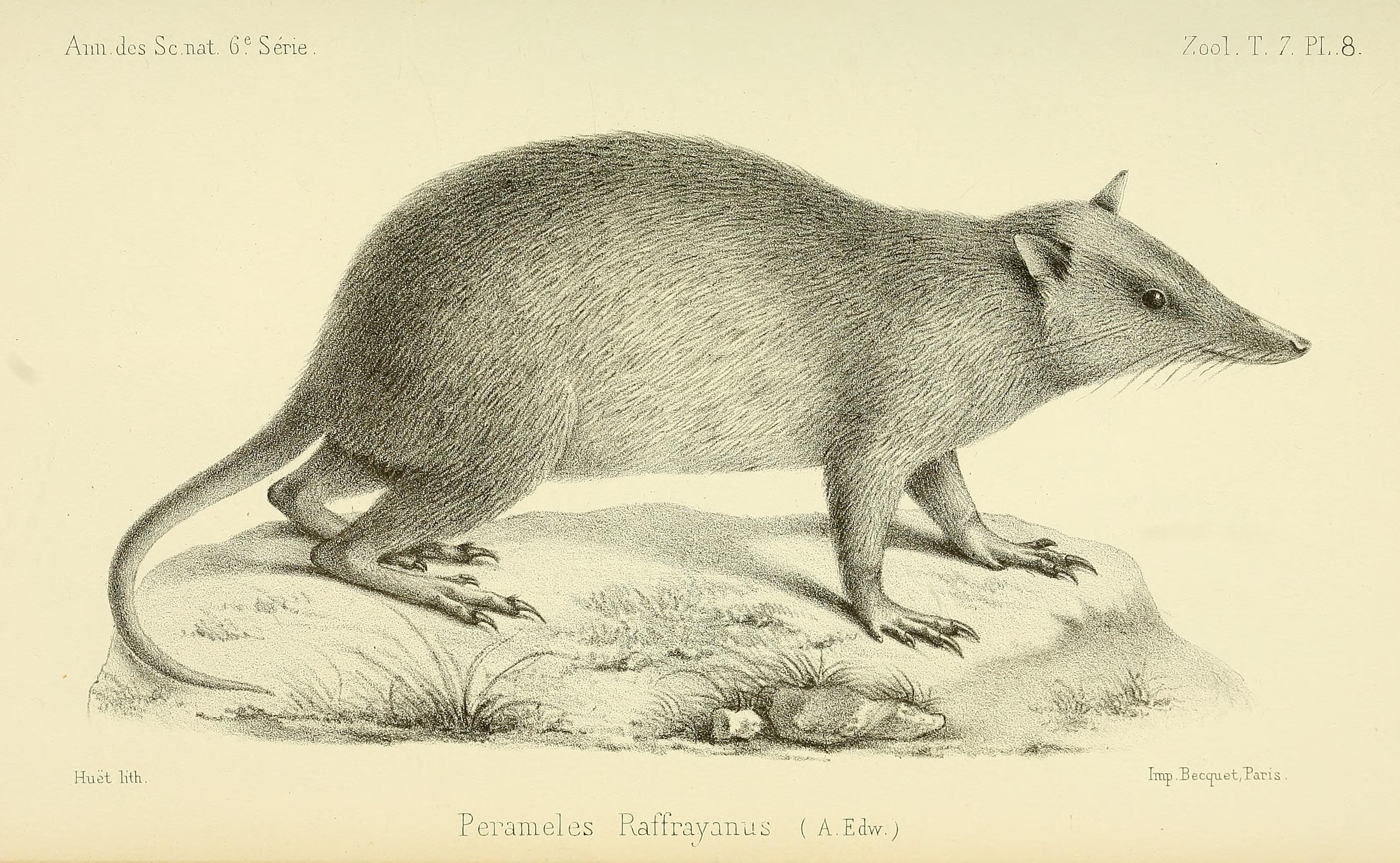
- New Guinean long-nosed bandicoots

Scientific classification
- Kingdom: Animalia
- Phylum: Chordata
- Class: Mammalia
- Infraclass: Marsupialia
- Order: Peramelemorphia
- Family: Peramelidae
- Subfamily: Peroryctinae; Groves & Flannery, 1990
- Genus: Peroryctes; Thomas, 1906

Type species
- Perameles raffrayana A. Milne-Edwards, 1878

Species
- †Peroryctes aruensis; Peroryctes broadbenti; Peroryctes raffrayana; Peroryctes trigonodon

= New Guinean long-nosed bandicoot =

New Guinean long-nosed bandicoots

Genus of marsupials

The New Guinean long-nosed bandicoots (genus Peroryctes) are members of the order Peramelemorphia. They are small to medium-sized marsupial omnivores native to New Guinea.

Two fossil taxa from Australia, Peroryctes tedfordi and then-unnamed Silvicultor hamiltonensis, were originally assigned to this genus, but they were subsequently transferred to the separate genus Silvicultor.
