= Giant bandicoot =

Conservation status
- Endangered (IUCN 3.1)

Scientific classification
- Kingdom: Animalia
- Phylum: Chordata
- Class: Mammalia
- Infraclass: Marsupialia
- Order: Peramelemorphia
- Family: Peramelidae
- Genus: Peroryctes
- Species: P. broadbenti

Binomial name
- Peroryctes broadbenti (Ramsay, 1879)
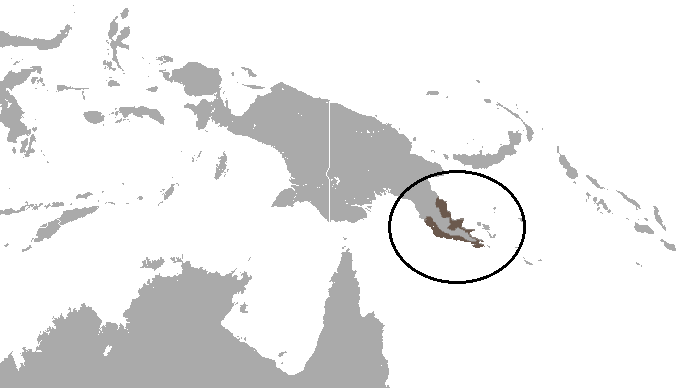
- Giant bandicoot range

Synonyms
- Perameles broadbenti Ramsay, 1879

Species of marsupial

The giant bandicoot (Peroryctes broadbenti) is a species of marsupial in the family Peramelidae. It is endemic to Papua New Guinea. Its natural habitat is subtropical or tropical dry forests.

== Description ==
A majority of what is known about the giant bandicoot is based on museum specimens as it is a naturally rare species.

With a body length up to 56 cm (22 in), tail length up to 23 cm (9.1 in), and weight up to 5 kg (11 lb), it is the largest of the peramelids. Limited research has shown extreme sexual dimorphism in size with male body weights of collected specimens reaching up to 5 kg (11 lb) and the adult females reaching only 1.4 kg (3.1 lb). This trend is similarly seen in body and hindfoot lengths as well as cranium size and shape, but not in general cranium robustness.

Of the 11 species of bandicoots on mainland Papua New Guinea, the giant bandicoot is the only bandicoot species that weighs more than 2 kg (4.4 lb). The giant bandicoot is more than twice the weight of other bandicoots and adult males of the species can attain weights well in excess of 4 kg (8.8 lb).

Its fur is a dark reddish brown speckled with black and it fades ventrally to a pale orange. It is a coarse texture. Its feet are pale, ears elongated, and tail scaly with some thin fur at the base.

== Distribution ==
It is endemic to Papua New Guinea with available records constricting them to the southeastern peninsula within three provinces (Central Province; Milne Bay Province; Oro Province). The hinterlands are more intensively sampled than the lowland foothill areas.

It natural habitat is subtropical or tropical dry forests with a preference for tall, lowland rainforests along creeks or rivers among dense vegetation. They range in altitudes from 50 - 150m on the north side of the peninsula to up to 1000m on the southern side.

== Behavior ==
It is a terrestrial omnivore. Mostly nocturnal, it is adapted for digging and plays a key role in soil distribution.

== Taxonomy ==
The giant bandicoot was first described in 1879 by E.P. Ramsay, a zoologist from Australia. There has historically been confusion between the identification of this species with other bandicoots which has led to incorrect classifications. It has often been mistaken for Peroryctes raffrayana despite differences in their size, fur color and texture, and cranial and dentel differences. It has also been referred to as Perameles broadbenti, a previously used scientific name that has since been reclassified.

The type locality is Papua New Guinea, Central Province, banks of the Goldie River (a tributary of the Laloki River), inland from Port Moresby.

== Conservation status ==
Due to its large size resulting in slower reproduction rates and the small extent of habitat it is endemic to, it is especially vulnerable to disturbances. It is listed as Endangered on the IUCN Red List with agriculture and hunting being among the greatest threats against them. Large scale palm oil plantations clear prime habitat and it has been hunted for food with records from the 1960s and 1970s recounting it being sold at markets. Additional stressors include predation from feral cats and dogs and water pollution.
