= Johann Baptist Fischer =

German botanist and zoologist

- Born: 1803; Munich (Germany)
- Died: 30 May 1832; Leiden (The Netherlands)
- Known for: Synopsis Mammalium
- Scientific career
- Fields: Zoologist and botanist

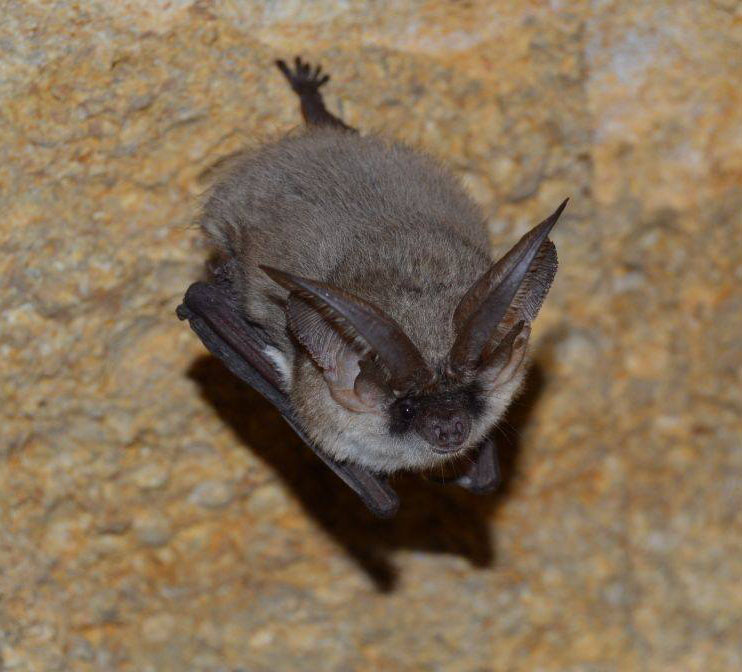
Plecotus austriacus (J. Fischer, 1829)

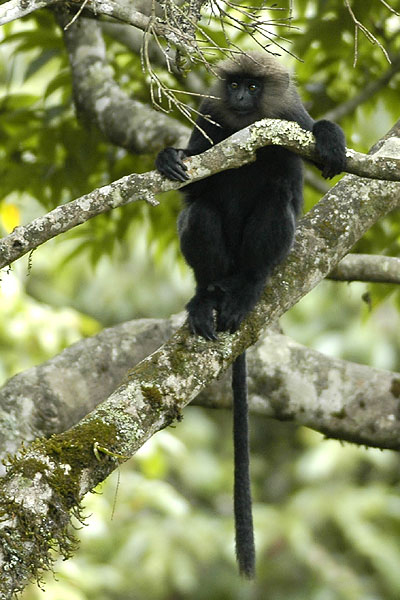
Trachypithecus johnii (J. Fischer, 1829)

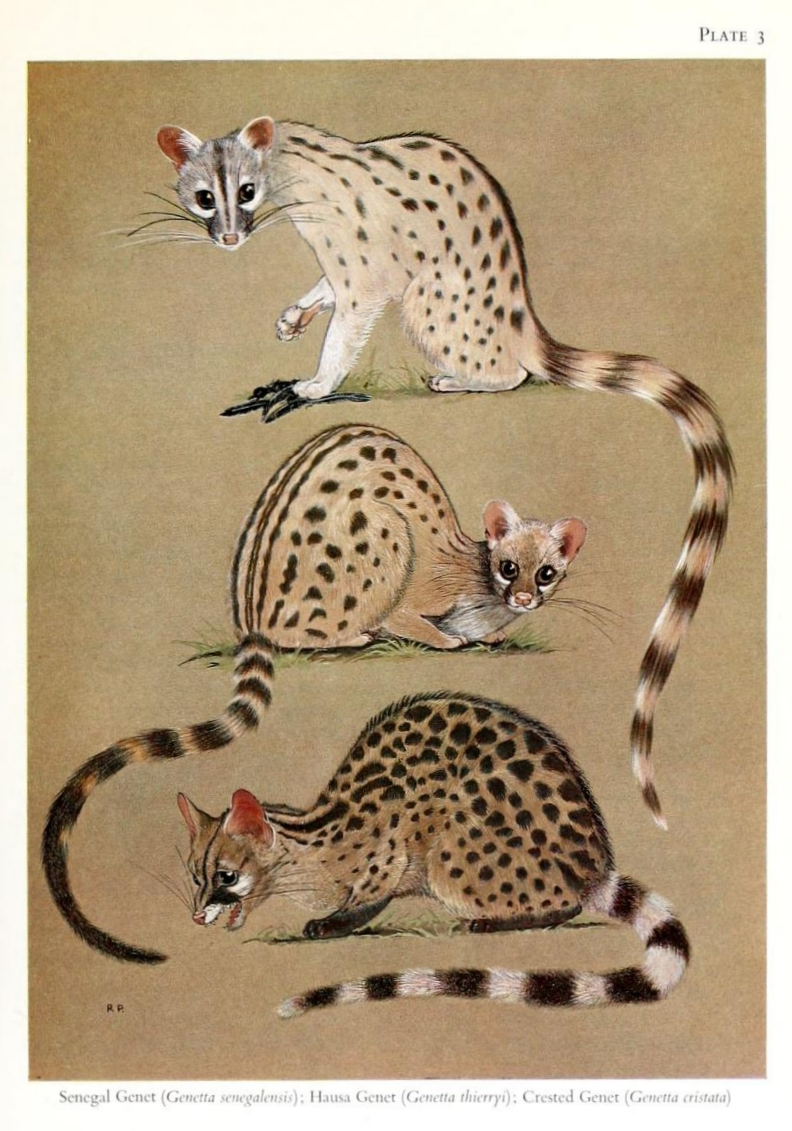
Genetta genetta senegalensis (J. Fischer, 1829) (top)

Johann Baptist Fischer, born 1803 in Munich (Germany), died 30 May 1832 in Leiden (the Netherlands) was a German naturalist, zoologist and botanist, doctor and surgeon.

== Biography ==
Fischer was the son of a Munich schoolmaster, also named Johann Baptist, and his wife Cäcilie Haimerl. His younger brother was Sebastian Fischer, who also became a physician and naturalist spending part of his career in Russia and then Egypt.

J. B. Fisher was the assistant of the botanist Carl Ludwig Blume in the former national herbarium of Brussels. In 1826, he joined an expedition to Java, then a possession of the Dutch East Indies, and participated with Blume in writing the description of the species collected. During the Belgian revolution of September 1830, he helped Philipp Franz von Siebold transferring herbarium specimens from Brussels to Leiden in the Netherlands. Johann Baptist Fischer also devoted himself to the study of mammals, and he published in 1830 his Synopsis Mammalium. He died at a young age from septic infection.

== Taxonomic descriptions ==
Johann Baptist Fischer described many species of plants, which were proven to be synonyms, as Agathosma desciscens (J.B.Fisch. 1832) synonym for Agathosma bifida Bartl. & H.L.Wendl., 1824.

In his Synopsis Mammalium, he also described a number of new mammalian species and subspecies.

=== Rodents ===
- Akodon azarae (J. Fischer, 1829), named in honor of the Spanish naturalist Félix de Azara
- Geocapromys brownii (J. Fischer, 1829), the Jamaican hutia, named in honor of the Irish naturalist Patrick Browne
- Megalomys desmarestii (J. Fischer, 1829), the muskrat of Martinique, an endemic rodent now extinct, and named in honor of the French zoologist Anselme Gaëtan Desmarest.

=== Primates ===
- Trachypithecus johnii (J. Fischer, 1829), the Nilgiri langur, a small monkey native to the south west of the India, named in honor of the missionary CS John.

=== Bats ===
- Centronycteris maximiliani (J. Fischer, 1829), the hirsute bat, named in honor of the prince Maximilian zu Wied-Neuwied
- Pipistrellus rueppellii (J. Fischer, 1829), the Rüppell's pipistrelle, named in honor of the German naturalist Eduard Rüppell
- Plecotus austriacus (J. Fischer, 1829), the grey long-eared bat.

=== Carnivores ===
- Caracal caracal nubica (J. Fischer, 1829), the Nubian caracal
- Genetta genetta senegalensis (J. Fischer, 1829), the Senegalese common genet.

=== Marsupials ===
- Echymipera kalubu (J. Fischer, 1829), the common spiny bandicoot, a small marsupial of New Guinea.
