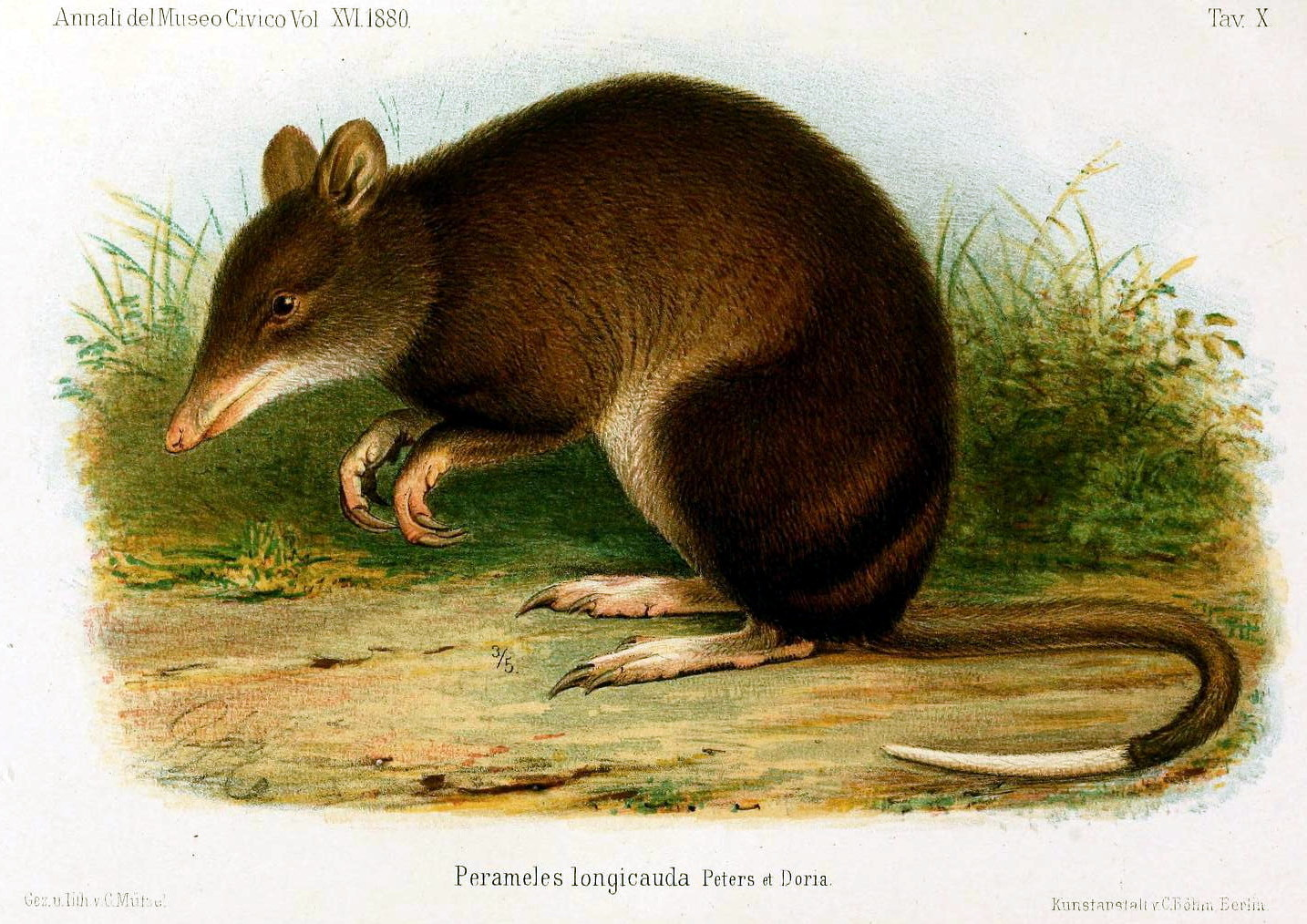

Conservation status
- Least Concern (IUCN 3.1)

Scientific classification
- Kingdom: Animalia
- Phylum: Chordata
- Class: Mammalia
- Infraclass: Marsupialia
- Order: Peramelemorphia
- Family: Peramelidae
- Genus: Microperoryctes
- Species: M. longicauda

Binomial name
- Microperoryctes longicauda (Peters & Doria, 1876)
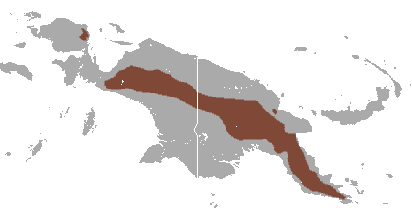
- Striped bandicoot range

= Striped bandicoot =

Species of marsupial

The striped bandicoot (Microperoryctes longicauda) is a species of marsupial in the family Peramelidae. It is found in West Papua and Papua New Guinea. Its natural habitat is subtropical or tropical dry forests. The striped bandicoot is a host of the Acanthocephalan intestinal parasite Australiformis semoni.
