= Kristofer Michael Helgen =

American zoologist (born 1980)

- Born: March 14, 1980 (age 46); Fridley, Minnesota, United States
- Education: University of Adelaide; Harvard University
- Known for: Description of more than 100 species of mammals
- Spouse: Lauren Elizabeth Johnston
- Scientific career
- Fields: Zoology
- Workplaces: Smithsonian Institution; George Mason University
- Thesis: (2007)
- Doctoral advisor: Tim Flannery and Russell V. Baudinette
- Author abbrev. (zoology): Helgen

Kristofer Michael Helgen (born March 14, 1980) is an American zoologist known for his research on mammalian biodiversity and taxonomy.

== Biography ==
=== Education ===
Helgen obtained a bachelor's degree in biology from Harvard University in 2001. During his student years, he worked extensively in the mammalogy collections at Harvard and in many major museums, traveling throughout southern Africa and Australia to study mammals. Among his professors were Donald Griffin, Tim Flannery, and Don E. Wilson.

In 2001, Helgen began fieldwork on the mammals of New Guinea and moved to Adelaide, Australia to study at the University of Adelaide and the South Australian Museum, first on a Fulbright Scholarship and later on a doctoral fellowship. He studied under Tim Flannery and Russell V. Baudinette. He took a great interest in the Australian fauna, participated in field expeditions in Borneo, Timor, Vanuatu, and several locations across New Guinea, and collaborated with museums in various countries. His doctoral dissertation focused on the systematics and biogeography of mammals in the Melanesia region. In 2006, while in Australia, he married the Australian biologist Lauren Elizabeth Johnston. He received his Ph.D. in zoology from the University of Adelaide in 2007.

Helgen later moved to Washington, D.C. for a postdoctoral fellowship at the National Museum of Natural History of the Smithsonian Institution, under the supervision of Don Wilson.

As a Smithsonian postdoctoral fellow, Helgen worked on the classification of numerous mammalian groups and participated in fieldwork in Ecuador, Borneo, New Guinea, and other locations.

=== Professional career ===
Since 2008, Helgen has worked as a zoologist, researcher, and curator of mammals at the National Museum of Natural History, becoming Curator-in-Charge of the Division of Mammals in 2009. His research has focused on mammals from all continents, particularly systematics, biogeography, ecomorphology, and conservation.

He is a professor at George Mason University, a research associate at the American Museum of Natural History, the Bernice P. Bishop Museum in Hawai‘i, and Texas Tech University. He is also an Emerging Explorer for the National Geographic Society, editor of Mammal Species of the World, and a member of the editorial board of ZooKeys. Helgen is a fellow and member of the Board of Directors of the American Society of Mammalogists, where he has served on numerous committees.

Helgen has worked in more than 60 countries and over 80 museums, has produced more than 100 peer-reviewed publications on mammalian biology, and in his research has documented nearly 100 mammal species previously unknown to science.
