= List of Australia-New Guinea species extinct in the Holocene =

The Australian continent, also called Australia-New Guinea or Sahul

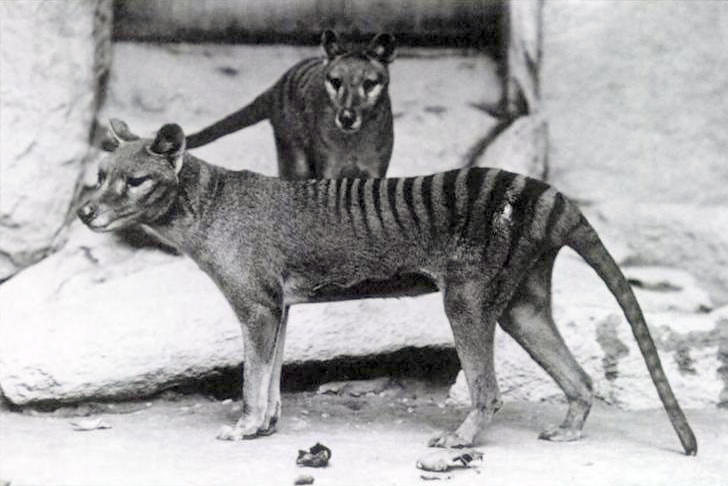
The thylacine (Thylacinus cynocephalus) is a large, carnivorous marsupial last seen in 1936.

This is a list of Australia-New Guinea species extinct in the Holocene that covers extinctions from the Holocene epoch, a geologic epoch that began about 11,650 years before present (about 9700 BCE) (Note: The source gives "11,700 calendar yr b2k (before CE 2000)". But "BP" means "before CE 1950". Therefore, the Holocene began 11,650 BP. Doing the math, that is c. 9700 BCE.) and continues to the present day.

The Australian continent is also called Australia-New Guinea or Sahul to avoid confusion with the country of Australia. The continent includes mainland Australia, Tasmania, the island of New Guinea, the Aru Islands, and other nearby islands. Australia-New Guinea is divided between three countries: Australia (mainland Australia and Tasmania), Papua New Guinea (eastern New Guinea), and Indonesia (Western New Guinea and the Aru Islands). Extinct species from the rest of Indonesia are covered in List of Asian animals extinct in the Holocene. Species from the outlying islands of the country of Australia and the Bismarck Archipelago of Papua New Guinea are included below. The Solomon Islands archipelago, split between Papua New Guinea (Autonomous Region of Bougainville) and the country of Solomon Islands, is covered in List of Oceanian species extinct in the Holocene.

The fauna of Australia-New Guinea is unique. Marsupials and monotremes also existed on other continents, but only in Australia-New Guinea did they come to dominate. Aside from marine mammals, only two orders of placental mammals are native to Australia-New Guinea: rodents and bats. Dingoes and New Guinea singing dogs are considered feral dogs (Canis familiaris) introduced by humans. The Christmas Island shrew is related to Asian shrews; no members of the order Eulipotyphla are native to Australia-New Guinea proper.

New Zealand species extinct in the Holocene are listed separately. The fauna of New Zealand is distinct from Australia-New Guinea. Birds, including numerous flightless birds, are the most important part of New Zealand's vertebrate fauna. Bats are New Zealand's only native land mammals.

Numerous species have disappeared from Australia-New Guinea as part of the ongoing Holocene extinction, driven by human activity. Most Australian megafauna disappeared in the Late Pleistocene, considerably earlier than in other continental landmasses. As a result, Australian Holocene extinctions generally are of modest size. Most Holocene extinctions occurred after the European settlement of Australia, which began with the First Fleet in 1788 CE. However, the thylacine, Tasmanian devil, and Tasmanian nativehen were extirpated from mainland Australia thousands of years before European settlement, although they survived in Tasmania. The Norfolk swamphen and several New Guinea mammals also disappeared before European colonisation.

In Australia, plants and animals are listed as extinct at the federal level under the auspices of the Environment Protection and Biodiversity Conservation Act 1999.

== Mammals (class Mammalia) ==
=== Platypus and echidnas (order Monotremata) ===
==== Echidnas (family Tachyglossidae) ====
===== Locally extinct (disputed) =====
Common name	Scientific name	Range	Comments	Pictures
Western long-beaked echidna	Zaglossus bruijnii	Western New Guinea, Indonesia and possibly Kimberley, Western Australia	This critically endangered species occurs in Western New Guinea, Indonesia. The existence of Zaglossus in mainland Australia during the Late Pleistocene is proven by fossils and cave paintings. A more recent presence in mainland Australia is disputed. A 2012 study reported the existence of a previously overlooked specimen in the Natural History Museum, London. The label notes it was collected by John T. Tunney from Mount Anderson in Kimberley, Western Australia in 1901. The study argues that the western long-beaked echidna survived as a rare species in Kimberley into the 20th century based on the circumstantial improbability of a collection label misassignment, the uniqueness of ectoparasites found on the specimen, the similarity of some Kimberley forests to known habitat in New Guinea, and the testimony of an Aboriginal elder. A 2017 study disputes this conclusion and argues that the specimen most likely came from New Guinea and was mislabeled. Additional research such as ancient DNA, stable isotopes, and trace elements may shed more light on this specimen, and targeted studies of relevant Kimberley Pleistocene and Holocene subfossil assemblages would be worthwhile.	

=== Carnivorous marsupials (order Dasyuromorphia) ===
==== Dog-like marsupials (family Thylacinidae) ====
Common name	Scientific name	Range	Comments	Pictures
Thylacine	Thylacinus cynocephalus	Mainland Australia, Tasmania, and New Guinea	In Tasmania, the last confirmed wild individual was killed in 1931, and the last in captivity died at Hobart Zoo in 1936. Contrary to the consensus, a 2023 statistical analysis of alleged sightings suggested that thylacines survived in remote Tasmanian wilderness for decades past the 1930s. The peak likelihood for thylacine extinction was from the late 1980s through the early 2000s. There is extensive evidence for thylacines in mainland Australia from paleontology and rock art. The scientific consensus is that thylacines were extirpated from mainland Australia around 1277-1229 BCE, although the Thylacine Museum records several alleged mainland sightings from the 19th and 20th centuries. Thylacines were also present in New Guinea until 3050 BCE. The extinction of the thylacine in mainland Australia was likely caused by competition with human hunters and dingos, while in Tasmania it was deliberately exterminated by sheep farmers.	

==== Marsupial shrews (family Dasyuridae) ====
Common name	Scientific name	Range	Comments	Pictures
Southern mulgara	Dasycercus archeri	Nullarbor Plain, Great Victoria Desert, and Swan Coastal Plain	Only known from subfossil remains.	
	Dasycercus cristicauda	Southern Australia?	Formerly considered a subspecies of the crest-tailed mulgara (D. hillieri).	
Little mulgara	Dasycercus marlowi	Northern Territory	Only known from subfossil remains.	
Northern mulgara	Dasycercus woolleyae	Tanami, Simpson, Gibson, and Great Sandy Deserts.	Only known from subfossil remains.	

===== Locally extinct =====
Common name	Scientific name	Range	Comments	Pictures
Tasmanian devil	Sarcophilus harrisii	Mainland Australia and Tasmania	Most recent subfossil remains in mainland Australia were dated to 1277-1229 BCE. The introduction of the dingo, changes and intensification of human hunting, and warming climate have been speculated as possible reasons. The species survives in Tasmania and was reintroduced to New South Wales in 2020.	

=== Bandicoots and bilbies (order Peramelemorphia) ===
==== Bandicoots (family Peramelidae) ====
Common name	Scientific name	Range	Comments	Pictures
Desert bandicoot	Perameles eremiana	Central Australia	Last known individual was collected in 1943, with unconfirmed sightings continuing until the 1960s. The extinction was caused by predation by introduced feral cats, red foxes, competition with European rabbits, and changes to the fire regime after the British colonization of Australia.	
New South Wales barred bandicoot	Perameles fasciata	New South Wales	Reclassified as a distinct species in a 2018 study. The last individual was collected in 1846.	
Southwestern barred bandicoot	Perameles myosuros	Western Australia	Reclassified as a distinct species in a 2018 study. The last individual was collected in 1906.	
Southern barred bandicoot	Perameles notina	South Australia, Victoria, New South Wales	Reclassified as a distinct species in a 2018 study. The last individual was collected in 1857.	
Nullarbor barred bandicoot	Perameles papillon	Nullarbor Plain, southern Australia	Described in a 2018 study. The last individual was collected in 1928.	
	Peroryctes aruensis	Pulau Kobroor, Aru Islands	Most recent remains dated to 9105-8482 BCE.	

==== Bilbies (family Thylacomyidae) ====
Common name	Scientific name	Range	Comments	Pictures
Lesser bilby	Macrotis leucura	Deserts of Australia	Also known as yallara. The last individual was collected in 1931, though a skull of unknown age was retrieved from a wedge-tailed eagle's nest in 1967. The main causes of extinction are believed to be predation by cats and foxes, possibly exacerbated by changes to the fire regime.	

==== Pig-footed bandicoots (family Chaeropodidae) ====
Common name	Scientific name	Range	Comments	Pictures
Southern pig-footed bandicoot	Chaeropus ecaudatus	Southern and western Australia	The last reliably dated individual was collected in 1901, though Pintupi people recalled it surviving in the Gibson desert until the 1950s. The cause of extinction was predation by feral cats and foxes. The two species were considered one until 2019.	
Northern pig-footed bandicoot	Chaeropus yirratji	Central Australia	The last reliably dated individual was collected in 1901, though Pintupi people recalled it surviving in the Gibson desert until the 1950s. The cause of extinction was predation by feral cats and foxes. The two species were considered one until 2019.	

=== Kangaroos, possums, wombats, and allies (order Diprotodontia) ===
==== Kangaroos and wallabies (family Macropodidae) ====
Common name	Scientific name	Range	Comments	Pictures
Mainland banded hare-wallaby	Lagostrophus fasciatus albipilis	Western Australia	Not considered to be a valid subspecies by some sources.	
Lake Mackay hare-wallaby	Lagorchestes asomatus	Between Mount Farewell and Lake Mackay, Northern Territory; possibly Great Sandy, Gibson, and Tanami Deserts	Also known as kuluwarri. The only known specimen was collected in 1932. Western Aboriginal Australians stated that it disappeared between 1940 and 1960. It was possibly driven to extinction by predation by feral cats and foxes, and changes to the fire regime.	
South-western rufous hare-wallaby	Lagorchestes hirsutus hirsutus	South-west of Western Australia	The south-western subspecies (L. h. hirsutus) is extinct. Two other subspecies survive: L. h. bernieri and L. h. 'central Australian subspecies'.	
Eastern hare-wallaby	Lagorchestes leporides	Interior southeastern Australia	Last specimen was collected in 1889. The species was possibly driven to extinction by habitat loss caused by livestock grazing and increased summer wildfires after the end of native controlled fires in the winter.	
Toolache wallaby	Notamacropus greyi	Southeastern Australia	The last confirmed records in the wild happened in 1924. Unconfirmed sightings happened in 1943 and 1950s-1970s, but extensive searching in the 1970s failed to locate any. The last captive animal died in 1939.	
Crescent nailtail wallaby	Onychogalea lunata	Western and central Australia	Last recorded individual was killed in 1956. Extinction caused by predation by feral cats and foxes, and human-induced habitat degradation.	
Giant kangaroo	Protemnodon tumbuna	Northern New Guinea	Most recent remains at Taora, New Guinea dated to 4850-3350 BCE. It disappeared at a time of fragmentation of the rainforest by the formation of new rivers and swamps, along with increased human population and hunting pressure.	
Christensen's pademelon	Thylogale christenseni	New Guinea	Most recent remains dated to 1738-1385 BCE.	
	Thylogale sp.	New Guinea	Most recent remains dated to 1738-1385 BCE.	

==== Bettongs, potoroos, and rat-kangaroos (family Potoroidae) ====
Common name	Scientific name	Range	Comments	Pictures
Desert bettong	Bettongia anhydra	Tanami Desert and Nullarbor Plain	Only known from one specimen collected in the Tanami in 1933 and subfossil material from the Nullarbor. The causes of extinction are presumed to be predation by feral cats and foxes, and changes to the fire regime.	
	Bettongia haoucharae	Nullarbor Plain	Only known from subfossil remains.	
	Bettongia ogilbyi francisca		Only known from subfossil remains.	
	Bettongia ogilbyi odontoplaica		Only known from subfossil remains.	
South-eastern woylie	Bettongia penicillata	South-eastern Australia	Declined due to extensive land clearing and the introduction of feral cats and red foxes.	
Nullarbor dwarf bettong	Bettongia pusilla	Nullarbor Plain, Hampton and Mallee bioregions	Known only from subfossil remains but considered to have survived until European settlement.	
Desert rat-kangaroo	Caloprymnus campestris	Channel Country and possibly southeastern Queensland	Last confirmed record in 1935 near Ooroowilanie, east of Lake Eyre, though several unconfirmed sightings were recorded in South Australia and Queensland between 1957 and 2011. It is considered to have become extinct due to predation by feral cats and foxes, though habitat degradation by herbivores could have contributed.	
Broad-faced potoroo	Potorous platyops	From the Swan Coastal Plain to the Eyre and Yorke Peninsulas, and Kangaroo Island	Last recorded in 1875. Presumed to have become extinct due to predation by feral cats, exotic diseases, inappropriate fire regimes, habitat loss and degradation due to grazing livestock.	

=== Rodents (order Rodentia) ===
==== Old World rats and mice (family Muridae) ====
Common name	Scientific name	Range	Comments	Pictures
White-footed rabbit rat	Conilurus albipes	South-eastern South Australia, Victoria, New South Wales and eastern Queensland	Last recorded 1860-1862 in Victoria, where it was at one time common and even regarded as a pest, though a possible observational record was made near Deniliquin, New South Wales, in the early 1940s. It probably disappeared due to predation by cats, though human-induced habitat degradation could have contributed.	
Capricorn rabbit rat	Conilurus capricornensis	Queensland	Known only from subfossil remains but considered to have survived until European settlement. Since there has not been a targeted survey for the Capricorn rabbit rat, there is a thin hope of its survival, although this is unlikely.	
Lesser stick-nest rat	Leporillus apicalis	Arid and semiarid central Australia	The last two specimens were collected south of the Musgrave Ranges in 1933, and the last unconfirmed sighting happened in 1970 in a cave along Canning Stock Route. Considered to have become extinct due to predation by feral cats, possibly helped by habitat degradation caused by introduced grazers.	
Bramble Cay melomys	Melomys rubicola	Bramble Cay, Queensland	Last recorded in 2009. Disappeared due to increasing storms that depleted the island of vegetation. Its extinction was described as the first extinction of a mammal species due to anthropogenic climate change.	
Short-tailed hopping mouse	Notomys amplus	From north-eastern South Australia and south-eastern Northern Territory to North West Cape	The only known specimens came from Charlotte Waters, Northern Territory in 1896. Subfossils indicate that it had a wide distribution in the central and western arid zone. Reasons for extinction are unknown, but could have been predation by feral cats and foxes.	
Long-tailed hopping-mouse	Notomys longicaudatus	From north-western New South Wales to North West Cape	Last collected in Barrow Creek, Northern Territory in 1901-1902. Extinction attributed to predation by feral cats.	
Big-eared hopping-mouse	Notomys macrotis	Western central wheatbelt of Western Australia	Last collected in 1843 near New Norcia. Considered to have been driven to extinction primarily by epizootic disease or predation by feral cats, with habitat degradation by sheep grazing as secondary factor.	
Darling Downs hopping mouse	Notomys mordax	Darling Downs, Queensland	Known from a single skull purchased in 1846. Considered extinct because of predation by feral cats, with habitat destruction by agriculture and livestock farming as possible contributors.	
Great hopping mouse	Notomys robustus	Davenport and Flinders Ranges, South Australia	Known only from skulls taken in old owl roosts.	
Blue-gray mouse	Pseudomys glaucus	South-eastern Queensland and north-eastern New South Wales	Last collected with certainty before 1892. Extinction considered to have been due to habitat clearance, predation by feral cats and possibly red foxes.	
Maclear's rat	Rattus macleari	Christmas Island	Last collected in 1901-1902. Became extinct after being infected by trypanosome carried by fleas hosted by black rats, which were accidentally introduced by the SS Hindustan in 1900.	
Bulldog rat	Rattus nativitatis	Christmas Island	Last recorded in 1897-1898. Became extinct after being infected by trypanosome carried by fleas hosted by black rats introduced in 1900. It was rarer than R. macleari and disappeared first.	
New Ireland forest rat	Rattus sanila	New Ireland, Bismarck Archipelago	Most recent remains dated to 347-535 CE.	

===== Possibly extinct =====
Common name	Scientific name	Range	Comments
Emma's giant rat	Uromys emmae	Owi Island, Papua, Indonesia	Last seen in 1946.

===== Locally extinct =====
Common name	Scientific name	Range	Comments	Pictures
Gould's mouse	Pseudomys gouldii	Arid zones of central, southern, and western Australia	Last collected on the mainland in Alice Springs, in 1895. Survived on Bernier Island, from where it was reintroduced to Faure Island, the Montebello Islands, and Lorna Glen in the Matuwa Kurrara Kurrara National Park of Western Australia.	

=== True insectivores (order Eulipotyphla) ===
==== True shrews (family Soricidae) ====
===== Possibly extinct =====
Common name	Scientific name	Range	Comments
Christmas Island shrew	Crocidura trichura	Christmas Island	Last seen in 1985. The reasons for its decline are unknown.

=== Bats (order Chiroptera) ===
==== Megabats (family Pteropodidae) ====
Common name	Scientific name	Range	Comments	Pictures
Percy Island flying fox	Pteropus brunneus	Percy Islands, Queensland	Known from a single specimen collected in 1874, though bats were reported as plentiful in the islands at the end of the 19th century. Possibly disappeared because of habitat loss.	

===== Possibly extinct, megabats (family Pteropodidae) =====
Common name	Scientific name	Range	Comments	Pictures
Aru flying fox	Pteropus aruensis	Aru Islands, Indonesia	Described in the mid-19th century. No sightings were made in the 20th century, but a jawbone found in a kitchen midden in 1992 probably belongs to this species.	

==== Vesper bats (family Vespertilionidae) ====
Common name	Scientific name	Range	Comments
Christmas Island pipistrelle	Pipistrellus murrayi	Christmas Island	Last recorded in 2009 following a 90% decline in three generations (10–15 years). The reasons are unclear, though predation and competition by introduced species, and exotic diseases have been suggested.
Lord Howe long-eared bat	Nyctophilus howensis	Lord Howe Island, New South Wales	Known from a single skull found in 1972 and believed to be between 50 and 100 years old. The reasons of extinction are unclear but could have been predated on by introduced rats and owls.

=== Carnivorans (order Carnivora) ===
==== Earless seals (family Phocidae) ====
===== Locally extinct =====
Common name	Scientific name	Range	Comments	Pictures
Southern elephant seal	Mirounga leonina	Antarctic	Most recent remains in mainland Tasmania dated to c. 950 AD; it was hunted by Aboriginal Tasmanians. Survived in King Island until the 19th century, when it was extirpated by Europeans. Survives in Macquarie Island.	

== Birds (class Aves) ==
=== Cassowaries and emus (order Casuariiformes) ===
==== Cassowaries and emus (family Casuariidae) ====
Common name	Scientific name	Range	Comments	Pictures
Kangaroo Island emu	Dromaius novaehollandiae baudinianus	Kangaroo Island	Last recorded in 1819. One egg found in 1830 could have been laid by an Australian emu introduced in 1826, or a hybrid. It was hunted to extinction.	
King Island emu	Dromaius novaehollandiae minor	King Island, Tasmania	Last recorded in the wild in 1805; the last in captivity died in 1822. It was hunted to extinction.	
Tasmanian emu	Dromaius novaehollandiae diemenensis	Tasmania	Last recorded in 1851. Captive animals reported until the 1870s may have been actually imported from Australia. It was hunted to extinction.	

=== Landfowl (order Galliformes) ===
==== Megapodes (family Megapodidae) ====
Common name	Scientific name	Range	Comments
New Ireland scrubfowl, large Bismarck's megapode	Megapodius sp.	New Ireland, Bismarck Archipelago	Prehistoric

===== Locally extinct =====
Common name	Scientific name	Range	Comments	Pictures
Dusky megapode	Megapodius freycinet	From the Maluku Islands to Tonga	Remains were found in archaeological assemblages of Nombe, in the New Guinea Highlands, which has been inhabited from 30,000 years ago to today. It lived in Tikopia, Solomon Islands until the Lapita period, and survives in the Indonesian Raja Ampat Islands, northwest of New Guinea, but connected to Sahul during the Last Glacial Period.	

=== Waterfowl (order Anseriformes) ===
==== Ducks, geese, and swans (family Anatidae) ====
Common name	Scientific name	Range	Comments
Macquarie Islands teal	Anas cf. chlorotis	Macquarie Island, Tasmania	Prehistoric

=== Pigeons and doves (order Columbiformes) ===
==== Pigeons and doves (family Columbidae) ====
Common name	Scientific name	Range	Comments	Pictures
Lord Howe pigeon	Columba vitiensis godmanae	Lord Howe Island	Hunted to extinction in 1853.	
Norfolk pigeon	Hemiphaga novaeseelandiae spadicea	Norfolk Island	Last recorded in 1900. It was hunted to extinction.	
Norfolk ground dove	Pampusana norfolkensis	Norfolk and possibly Nepean Island	Known from a 1788-1790 painting and descriptions. No remains survive, though bones found in the islands may belong to this species.	

=== Rails and cranes (order Gruiformes) ===
==== Rails (family Rallidae) ====
Common name	Scientific name	Range	Comments	Pictures
New Ireland rail	Hypotaenidia ernstmayri	New Ireland, Bismarck Archipelago	Known from fragmentary subfossil remains.	
Macquarie Island banded rail	Hypotaenidia philippensis macquarensis	South Macquarie Island, Tasmania	Last recorded in 1879. Driven to extinction by hunting and predation by introduced feral cats, mongooses, pigs, and dogs.	
Norfolk Island rail	Hypotaenidia sp.	Norfolk Island	Possibly depicted in a 1788 painting. It was hunted to extinction.	
Western Lewin's rail	Lewinia pectoralis clelandi	Southwestern Australia	Last recorded in 1932. Extinct because of drainage and burning of wetlands for agriculture and settlement.	
White swamphen	Porphyrio albus	Lord Howe Island, New South Wales	Last recorded with certainty in 1790. It was hunted by whalers and sailors, and was extinct by the time the island was colonized in 1834.	
Giant swamphen	Porphyrio sp.	New Ireland, Bismarck Archipelago	Prehistoric	
New Ireland swamphen	Porphyrio sp.	New Ireland, Bismarck Archipelago	Prehistoric	
Norfolk swamphen	Porphyrio sp.	Norfolk Island	Known from remains in Polynesian middens. It was extinct by the time of European colonisation in 1788.	

===== Possibly extinct, rails (family Rallidae) =====
Common name	Scientific name	Range	Comments
Bismarck red-necked crake	Rallina tricolor convicta	New Ireland and New Hannover islands, Bismarck Archipelago, Papua New Guinea	Last collected in 1944.

===== Locally extinct, rails (family Rallidae) =====
Common name	Scientific name	Range	Comments	Pictures
Tasmanian nativehen	Tribonyx mortierii	Mainland Australia and Tasmania	This flightless bird is widespread in Tasmania, having benefited from European-style agriculture. Fossil records indicate that it was found on the Australian mainland until around 4700 years ago. Suggested reasons for its extirpation have included human overhunting, the introduction of the dingo, or an extremely dry period.	

=== Shorebirds (order Charadriiformes) ===
==== Sandpipers (family Scolopacidae) ====
Common name	Scientific name	Range	Comments
Norfolk snipe	Coenocorypha sp.	Norfolk Island	Prehistoric

=== Albatrosses and petrels (order Procellariiformes) ===
==== Petrels and shearwaters (family Procellariidae) ====
Common name	Scientific name	Range	Comments
Mount Pitt petrel	Pterodroma sp.	Norfolk Island	Believed to be a third nesting population of the Providence petrel (P. solandri), which only nests in Lord Howe and Philip Island, a subspecies, or a related species. It was discovered in 1777 and wiped out by hunting between 1788 and 1790.

=== Boobies, cormorants, and allies (order Suliformes) ===
==== Cormorants and shags (family Phalacrocoracidae) ====
Common name	Scientific name	Range	Comments
Serventys' cormorant	Microcarbo serventyorum	Bullsbrook, Western Australia	Known from a subfossil pelvis and associated proximal femora and caudal vertebrae.

=== Hawks and relatives (order Accipitriformes) ===
==== Hawks, eagles, kites, harriers and Old World vultures (family Accipitridae) ====
Scientific name	Range	Comments
Accipiter sp. 1	New Ireland, Bismarck Archipelago	Prehistoric. One of the two New Ireland species may be the extant Meyer's goshawk.
Accipiter sp. 2	New Ireland, Bismarck Archipelago	Prehistoric. One of the two New Ireland species may be the extant Meyer's goshawk.

=== Owls (order Strigiformes) ===
==== True owls (family Strigidae) ====
Common name	Scientific name	Range	Comments	Images
Lord Howe boobook	Ninox novaeseelandiae albaria	Lord Howe Island, New South Wales	Probably disappeared in the 1940s or 1950s due to deforestation, predation by introduced black rats, and predation or competition with southern boobooks, barn owls, and masked owls (all introduced in unsuccessful attempts to control the invasive rat population).	
Norfolk boobook	Ninox novaeseelandiae undulata	Norfolk Island	Last individual died in 1996. Declined due to deforestation leading to increased competition for nest-hollows with honeybees and crimson rosellas. Descendants hybridized with the New Zealand subspecies N. n. novaeseelandiae survive in the island.	

==== Barn-owls (family Tytonidae) ====
Common name	Scientific name	Range	Comments
Mussau barn owl	Tyto cf. novaehollandiae	Mussau Island, Bismarck Archipelago	Prehistoric
Greater New Ireland barn owl	Tyto cf. novaehollandiae	New Ireland, Bismarck Archipelago	Prehistoric
Lesser New Ireland barn owl	Tyto cf. alba / aurantia	New Ireland, Bismarck Archipelago	Prehistoric

=== Parrots (order Psittaciformes) ===
==== Kea and kākā (family Nestoridae) ====
Common name	Scientific name	Range	Comments	Pictures
Norfolk kākā	Nestor productus	Norfolk Island	The last birds in the wild disappeared during the second colony period between 1825 and 1854, probably early on as they were not recorded by Abel Dottin William Best between 1838 and 1839. The last in captivity died in London in 1851. Disappeared because of hunting and habitat destruction by introduced rabbits, pigs, and goats.	

==== Cockatoos (family Cacatuidae) ====
Common name	Scientific name	Range	Comments
New Ireland cockatoo	Cacatua sp.	New Ireland, Bismarck Archipelago	Prehistoric

==== Old World parrots (family Psittaculidae) ====
Common name	Scientific name	Range	Comments	Pictures
Lord Howe parakeet	Cyanoramphus subflavescens	Lord Howe Island, New South Wales	Last seen in 1869. Exterminated by farmers because it predated on gardens and crops.	
Macquarie parakeet	Cyanoramphus novaezelandiae erythrotis	Macquarie Island, Tasmania	Last seen in 1890. Probably driven to extinction by introduced weka and rabbits.	
Paradise parrot	Psephotellus pulcherrimus	Southeastern Queensland and possibly New South Wales	Last confirmed observation in 1927 or 1928; it was considered extinct after a drought in 1902 but was rediscovered in 1918. Unconfirmed observations were made in the 1930s, 1940s, and 1990. Extinction factors include reduction of food supply due to drought and overgrazing, deforestation, altered fire regimes, spread of invasive prickly pears in Australia, disease, hunting and nest raiding.	
Moseley's parrot	Psittrichas sp.	Admiralty Islands, Papua New Guinea	Only known from Henry Nottidge Moseley's 1879 description, who compared it to Pesquet's parrot from inland New Guinea.	

=== Perching birds (order Passeriformes) ===
==== Australasian wrens (family Maluridae) ====
Common name	Scientific name	Range	Comments	Pictures
Dirk Hartog thick-billed grasswren	Amytornis textilis carteri	Dirk Hartog Island, Western Australia	Last recorded in 1918. Disappeared due to predation by introduced black rats.	
Namoi Valley thick-billed grasswren	Amytornis textilis inexpectatus	Central New South Wales	Last recorded in 1912. Reasons of extinction unknown.	
Southwestern thick-billed grasswren	Amytornis textilis macrourus	Southwestern Australia	Last recorded in 1910. Extinct due to drought and overgrazing by introduced mammals.	

==== Bristlebirds (family Dasyornithidae) ====
Common name	Scientific name	Range	Comments	Pictures
Western rufous bristlebird	Dasyornis broadbenti litoralis	Southwestern Australia	Last recorded around 1930. Disappeared due to the burning of shrublands for pasture and predation by feral cats.	

==== Australian warblers (family Acanthizidae) ====
Common name	Scientific name	Range	Comments	Pictures
Lord Howe gerygone	Gerygone insularis	Lord Howe Island, New South Wales	Last recorded in 1928. Presumed to have become extinct due to nest raiding by black rats, but disease from introduced passerines could also have been a factor.	

==== Cuckooshrikes and allies (family Campephagidae) ====
Common name	Scientific name	Range	Comments	Pictures
Norfolk triller	Lalage leucopyga leucopyga	Norfolk Island	Last recorded in 1942. Probably driven to extinction by invasive black rats and deforestation.	

==== Fantails and silktails (family Rhipiduridae) ====
Common name	Scientific name	Range	Comments	Pictures
Lord Howe fantail	Rhipidura fuliginosa cervina	Lord Howe Island, New South Wales	Last recorded in 1924. Probably disappeared due to predation by introduced black rats.	

==== Crows and relatives (family Corvidae) ====
Common name	Scientific name	Range	Comments
New Ireland crow	Corvus sp.	New Ireland, Bismarck Archipelago	Prehistoric

==== Australasian robins (family Petroicidae) ====
Common name	Scientific name	Range	Comments
Roper River scrub robin	Drymodes superciliaris colcloughi	Northern Territory	Last recorded in 1910. This subspecies may be invalid. It is known from only two specimens of doubtful provenance.

===== Possibly extinct =====
Common name	Scientific name	Range	Comments
Tiwi Islands hooded robin	Melanodryas cucullata melvillensis	Melville and Bathurst Islands, Northern Territory	Last recorded in 1992. Could have disappeared due to changes in the fire regime.

==== White-eyes (family Zosteropidae) ====
Common name	Scientific name	Range	Comments	Pictures
Robust white-eye	Zosterops strenuus	Lord Howe Island, New South Wales	Extinction believed to be a result of predation by black rats that escaped the wreck of the SS Makambo in 1918, as it was not found in searches carried out in 1928 and 1936.	

===== Possibly extinct, white-eyes (family Zosteropidae) =====
Common name	Scientific name	Range	Comments	Pictures
White-chested white-eye	Zosterops albogularis	Norfolk Island	Last confirmed sighting in 2000, followed by an unconfirmed one in 2005. The species declined due to competition with the silvereye Zosterops lateralis, which was introduced in 1904; the accidental introduction of black rats in the mid-1940s, and the clearance of forests.	

==== Grassbirds and allies (family Locustellidae) ====
===== Possibly extinct =====
Common name	Scientific name	Range	Comments
New Britain thicketbird	Cincloramphus grosvenori	New Britain, Bismarck Archipelago	Known only from two individuals collected, and another two seen shortly after, in 1958.

==== Thrushes (family Turdidae) ====
Common name	Scientific name	Range	Comments	Pictures
Norfolk thrush	Turdus poliocephalus poliocephalus	Norfolk Island	The subspecies became extinct around the late 1970s, with the last confirmed record in 1975. The cause of its extinction is attributed to a combination of clearing of native vegetation and predation by rats and feral cats. Additional factors were competition with introduced song thrushes and common blackbirds, as well as interbreeding with the latter species producing sterile offspring.	
Lord Howe thrush	Turdus poliocephalus vinitinctus	Lord Howe Island, New South Wales	Not recorded since c. 1924. Believed to be a result of the introduction of black rats following the grounding of the SS Makambo in June 1918.	

==== Starlings (family Sturnidae) ====
Common name	Scientific name	Range	Comments	Pictures
Norfolk Island starling	Aplonis fusca fusca	Norfolk Island	Last recorded in 1923, although its absence was not noted until 1968. It may have disappeared due to habitat destruction, or predation by black rats if it survived until 1940, when they were introduced to the island. As the last surviving subspecies, its extinction was also that of the species.	
Lord Howe starling	Aplonis fusca hulliana	Lord Howe Island, New South Wales	Last seen in 1918. Probably disappeared due to predation by black rats, which were introduced to the island in that year.	

== Reptiles (class Reptilia) ==
=== Squamates (order Squamata) ===
==== Common geckos (family Gekkonidae) ====
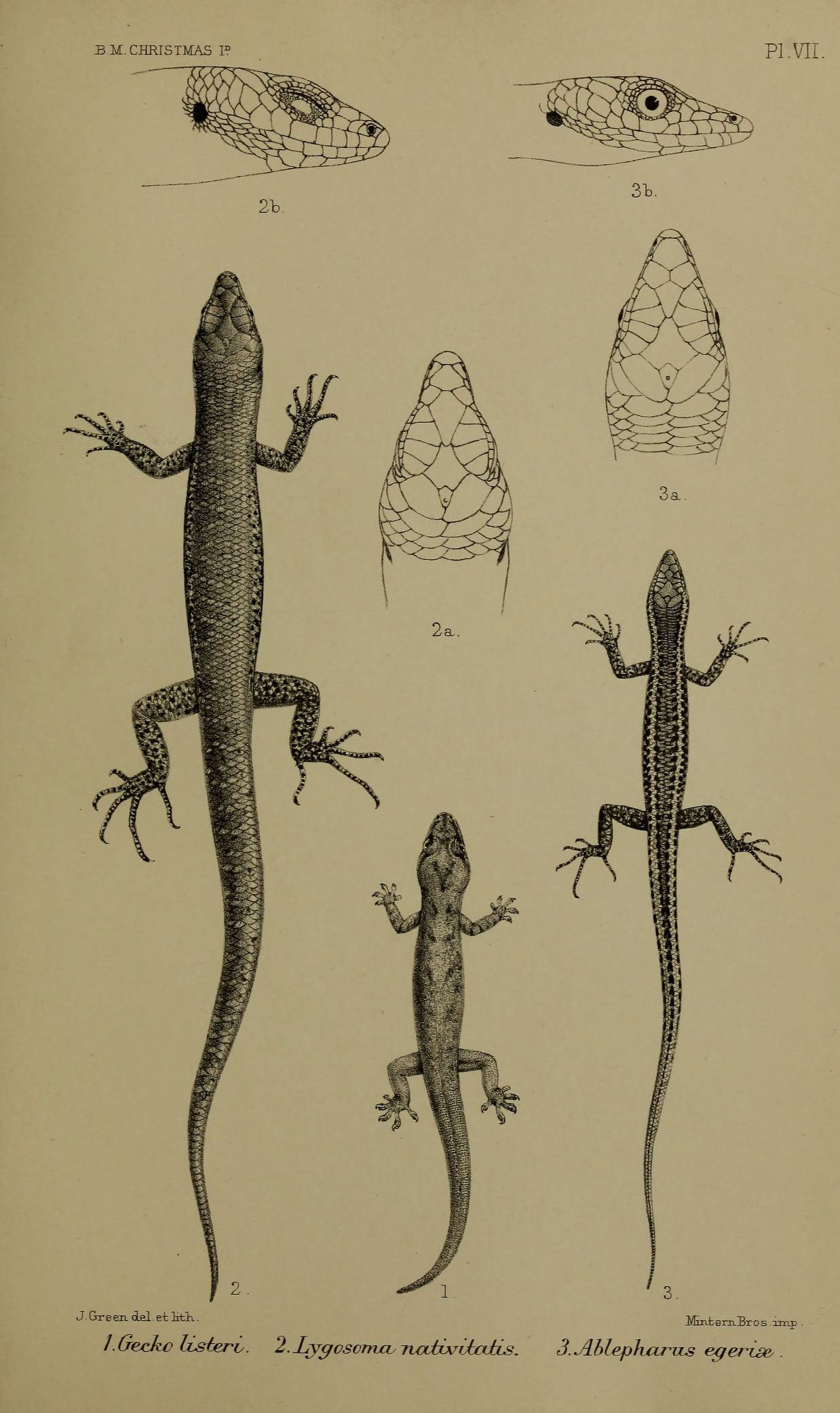
All extinct and extinct in the wild reptiles of Christmas Island, from left to right: Emoia nativitatis, Lepidodactylus listeri, Cryptoblepharus egeriae.

===== Extinct in the wild =====
Common name	Scientific name	Range	Comments
Christmas Island chained gecko	Lepidodactylus listeri	Christmas Island	Last recorded in the wild in 2012, probably as a result of predation by introduced Indian wolf snakes.

==== Skinks (family Scincidae) ====
Common name	Scientific name	Range	Comments
Christmas Island forest skink	Emoia nativitatis	Christmas Island	Last seen in the wild in 2010. An attempted captivity breeding program in 2009 failed because only females could be captured, and the last captive animal died in 2014. Became extinct due to predation by introduced Indian wolf snakes, possibly hastened by deforestation.

===== Extinct in the wild, skinks (family Scincidae) =====
Common name	Scientific name	Range	Comments
Christmas Island blue-tailed skink	Cryptoblepharus egeriae	Christmas Island	Last seen in the wild in 2010, likely as a result of predation by introduced Indian wolf snakes.

== Amphibians (class Amphibia) ==
=== Toads and frogs (order Anura) ===
==== Australian ground frogs (family Myobatrachidae) ====
Common name	Scientific name	Range	Comments	Pictures
Southern gastric-brooding frog	Rheobatrachus silus	Conondale and Blackall Ranges, Queensland	Last captured from the wild in 1981, the last captive specimen died in 1983. Reasons for extinction unknown, but chytridiomycosis is suspected.	
Northern gastric-brooding frog	Rheobatrachus vitellinus	Eungella National Park, Queensland	Last recorded in 1985. Reasons for extinction unknown, but chytridiomycosis is suspected.	
Sharp snouted day frog	Taudactylus acutirostris	Coastal north Queensland from Mount Graham to the Big Tableland	Last seen in 1997, apparently exterminated by chytridiomycosis.	
Mount Glorious day frog	Taudactylus diurnus	Blackall, Conondale, and D'Aguilar Ranges in southeast Queensland	Last recorded in 1979. Reasons of extinction unknown, but chytridiomycosis is suspected.	

==== Australian treefrogs (family Pelodryadidae) ====
Common name	Scientific name	Range	Comments
Mountain mist frog	Mosleyia nyakalensis	Wet Tropics of Queensland	Last recorded in 1990, declared extinct in 2022. Rapidly declined, likely due to chytridiomycosis.

===== Data deficient, Australian treefrogs (family Pelodryadidae) =====
Common name	Scientific name	Range	Comments
Peppered tree frog	Dryopsophus piperatus	A very small area of the Northern Tablelands, New South Wales	This species was last seen in 1973. It is classified as data deficient because there is substantial uncertainty regarding its taxonomic status. Either the type series represents unusually coloured individuals of Pearson's green tree frog or it is a distinct species that is now most likely extinct.

== Ray-finned fish (class Actinopterygii) ==
=== Anglerfish (order Lophiiformes) ===
==== Handfish (family Brachionichthyidae) ====
===== Data deficient =====
Common name	Scientific name	Range	Comments	Picture
Smooth handfish	Sympterichthys unipennis	Southeastern Tasmania	Last recorded in 1802. Possibly disappeared due to habitat destruction and accidental capture at scallop and oyster fisheries.	

=== Galaxias (order Galaxiiformes) ===
==== Galaxias (family Galaxiidae) ====
===== Extinct in the wild =====
Common name	Scientific name	Range	Comments	Pictures
Pedder galaxias	Galaxias pedderensis	Lake Pedder, Tasmania	Initially, the species expanded its range after the area was inundated for hydroelectric power generation in 1972. Introduced trout were a significant factor in the decline of this species. It was scarce by 1980, and the last wild specimen was captured in 1996. The species survives in two translocated populations outside its original range, one at Lake Oberon in the Western Arthurs mountain range and one at a modified water supply dam near Strathgordon.	

== Insects (class Insecta) ==
=== Beetles (order Coleoptera) ===
==== Predaceous diving beetles (family Dytiscidae) ====
Scientific name	Range
Rhantus papuanus	Papua New Guinea

=== Fleas (order Siphonaptera) ===
==== Family Pulicidae ====
Scientific name	Range	Comments
Xenopsylla nesiotes	Christmas Island	Parasite of Maclear's rat.

=== Book lice, bark lice, and sucking lice (order Psocodea) ===
==== Chicken body lice (family Menoponidae) ====
===== Possibly extinct =====
Scientific name	Range	Comments
Titanolichus seemani	Southeastern Australia	Known only from the holotype collected from a museum specimen of critically endangered orange-bellied parrot.

==== Bird chewing lice (family Philopteridae) ====
Scientific name	Range	Comments
Coloceras hemiphagae	Norfolk Island	Parasites of the Norfolk Island pigeon, co-extinct with their host.
Coloceras restinctus	Norfolk Island	Parasites of the Norfolk Island pigeon, co-extinct with their host.

== Arachnids (class Arachnida) ==
=== Ticks (order Ixodida) ===
==== Hard ticks (family Ixodidae) ====
Scientific name	Range	Comments
Ixodes nitens	Christmas Island	Parasite of Maclear's rat.

== Snails and slugs (class Gastropoda) ==
=== Order Stylommatophora ===
==== Family Bothriembryontidae ====
Common name	Scientific name	Range	Comments
Lord Howe flax snail (subspecies)	Placostylus bivaricosus etheridgei	Lord Howe Island, New South Wales	A type of land snail.

== Clitellates (class Clitellata) ==
=== Order Opisthopora ===
==== Family Megascolecidae ====
Common name	Scientific name	Range	Comments	Pictures
Lake Pedder earthworm	Hypolimnus pedderensis	Lake Pedder, Tasmania	Known only from one specimen collected in 1971. The area was inundated for hydroelectric power generation in 1972.	

== Fungi (kingdom Fungi) ==
=== Lichenized fungi (order Lecanorales) ===
==== Main lichenized fungi (family Parmeliaceae) ====
===== Locally extinct =====
Scientific name	Range	Comments	Pictures
Punctelia subflava	Central and southern Australia	Extirpated from Tasmania.	

== Red algae (division Rhodophyta) ==
=== Order Ceramiales ===
==== Family Delesseriaceae ====
Common name	Scientific name	Range	Comments	Pictures
Bennett's seaweed	Vanvoorstia bennettiana	Sydney Harbour, New South Wales	Last collected in 1886.	

== Plants (kingdom Plantae) ==
=== Lycopods (class Lycopodiopsida) ===
==== Clubmosses (family Lycopodiaceae) ====
===== Locally extinct =====
Common name	Scientific name	Range	Comments	Pictures
Toothed clubmoss	Huperzia serrata	South and east Asia	Listed as extinct in Australia in 2000.	
	Pseudodiphasium volubile	Southeast Asia, New Guinea, New Caledonia, northeastern Queensland, and New Zealand	Collected at Mount Bellenden Ker and an unknown locality in Queensland. Listed as extinct in Australia in 2000.	

=== Ferns (class Polypodiophyta) ===
==== Bristle ferns (family Hymenophyllaceae) ====
Common name	Scientific name	Range	Comments
Filmy fern	Hymenophyllum whitei	Thornton Peak, northeastern Queensland	Listed as extinct in 2000.

===== Locally extinct =====
Scientific name	Range	Comments
Didymoglossum exiguum	Southern India and Sri Lanka to the Malay Peninsula and northeastern Queensland	Only recorded once in the Bellenden Ker Range.
Hymenophyllum lobbii	Northeast Borneo and northeastern Queensland	Only recorded once in Mount Bellenden Ker, between 1909 and 1910.

==== Adder's-tongue ferns (family Ophioglossaceae) ====
===== Locally extinct =====
Common name	Scientific name	Range	Comments
Austral moonwort	Botrychium australe	Central Papua New Guinea, eastern Australia, Lord Howe Island, New Zealand, and the Chatham Islands	Extirpated from Tasmania.

==== Polypodies and hard ferns (family Polypodiaceae) ====
===== Locally extinct =====
Scientific name	Range	Comments
Lemmaphyllum accedens	Southeast Asia, New Guinea, and Polynesia	Recorded at Lake Eacham, Queensland in 1910. Survives in New Guinea.

==== Whisk ferns and hanging fork ferns (family Psilotaceae) ====
Scientific name	Range	Comments
Tmesipteris lanceolata	Queensland	Listed as extinct in 2000.

==== Maidenhair ferns and relatives (family Pteridaceae) ====
===== Locally extinct =====
Common name	Scientific name	Range	Comments	Pictures
Grass fern	Monogramma dareicarpa	Indonesia, Philippines, New Guinea, and northern Queensland	Formerly recorded at Mount Bellenden Ker. Listed as extinct in Australia in 2000.	

=== Flowering plants (clade Angiospermae) ===
==== Amaranths (family Amaranthaceae) ====
===== Locally extinct =====
Common name	Scientific name	Range	Comments
Glistening salt-bush	Atriplex billardierei	Coastal Victoria, Tasmania, New Zealand, and Chatham Islands	Listed as extinct in Victoria in 2014.
Papery goosefoot	Chenopodium erosum	Southeastern Australia and South Island of New Zealand	Extirpated from Tasmania.

==== Fig-marigolds (family Aizoaceae) ====
Scientific name	Range	Comments
Trianthema cypseleoides	Hawkesbury River, New South Wales	Only known from the holotype collected in 1839.

==== Celeries, carrots and parsleys (family Apiaceae) ====
===== Locally extinct =====
Common name	Scientific name	Range	Comments	Pictures
Tiny flannel-flower	Actinotus bellidioides	Southern Australia and Tasmania	Last recorded in Western Australia in 1891 and Victoria in 1944. Survives in Tasmania.	

==== Dogbanes (family Apocynaceae) ====
===== Possibly extinct =====
Scientific name	Range	Comments
Leichhardtia araujacea	Northern Queensland	Last collected in 1893.

==== Sunflowers (family Asteraceae) ====
Common name	Scientific name	Range	Comments
	Myriocephalus nudus	Western Australia	Listed as extinct in 2019.
	Olearia oliganthema	New South Wales	Listed as extinct in 2000.
Clubmoss everlasting	Ozothamnus selaginoides	Mount Wellington, Tasmania	Last collected in 1849.
Grey groundsel	Senecio georgianus	Western, eastern, and southern Australia, including Tasmania	Last collected in Victoria in 1972. Despite its large range, it was never considered common.

===== Possibly extinct =====
Common name	Scientific name	Range	Comments
Coast dandelion	Taraxacum cygnorum	Australia	Last recorded after 1986.

===== Locally extinct =====
Common name	Scientific name	Range	Comments
Sticky long-heads	Podotheca angustifolia	Western and southern Australia	Extirpated in Tasmania.
Large-fruit groundsel	Senecio macrocarpus	Southeastern Australia	Extirpated in Tasmania.

==== Mustards (family Brassicaceae) ====
Common name	Scientific name	Range	Comments
Drummond's lepidium	Lepidium drummondi	Western Australia	Listed as extinct in 2000.

===== Locally extinct =====
Common name	Scientific name	Range	Comments	Pictures
Southern shepherd's purse	Ballantinia pumilio	Central Victoria and Tasmania	Currently found only in Mount Alexander, Victoria.	

==== Guinea flowers (family Dilleniaceae) ====
===== Locally extinct =====
Common name	Scientific name	Range	Comments	Pictures
Hoary Guinea flower	Hibbertia obtusifolia	Eastern Australia	Extirpated from Tasmania.	

==== Quandongs (family Elaeocarpaceae) ====
Common name	Scientific name	Range	Comments
Cronin's tetratheca	Tetratheca fasciculata	Wagin, Western Australia	Last collected near Wagin Lake in 1895.

==== Heathers (family Ericaceae) ====
Common name	Scientific name	Range	Comments
Small-flowered leucopogon	Leucopogon cryptanthus	Western Australia	Listed as extinct in 2000.
Hidden coleanthera	Styphelia lanata	Western Australia	Listed as extinct in 2000.

==== Euphorbias (family Euphorbiaceae) ====
Scientific name	Range	Comments
Amperea xiphoclada var. pedicellata	Double Bay, Sydney, New South Wales	Only known from the type specimen collected in 1892.

==== Legumes (family Fabaceae) ====
Common name	Scientific name	Range	Comments	Pictures
	Acacia kingiana	Wagin, Western Australia	Only known from the type specimen collected in 1923.	
Maiden's bush-pea	Pultenaea maidenii	South-western side of the Victoria Range in the Grampians, Victoria	Only known from collections made between 1903 and 1906. Listed as extinct in 2000.	
Phillip Island glory pea	Streblorrhiza speciosa	Phillip Island	Considered extinct by the 1830s, likely due to grazing by introduced feral pigs, goats and rabbits.	

==== Sea heaths (family Frankeniaceae) ====
Common name	Scientific name	Range	Comments
Decurrent-leaved frankenia	Frankenia decurrens	Western Australia	Listed as extinct in 2015.

==== Fan-flowers (family Goodeniaceae) ====
===== Locally extinct =====
Scientific name	Range	Comments
Coopernookia barbata	Southwestern and southeastern Australia	Extirpated from Tasmania.

==== Watermilfoils (family Haloragaceae) ====
===== Locally extinct =====
Scientific name	Range	Comments
Myriophyllum glomeratum	Victoria, southern New South Wales, and northern Tasmania	Extirpated from Tasmania.

==== Mints (family Lamiaceae) ====
Common name	Scientific name	Range	Comments
Alpine mint-bush	Prostanthera cuneata	Southeastern Australia	Extirpated from Tasmania.

==== Mallows (family Malvaceae) ====
Common name	Scientific name	Range	Comments
Mount Holland thomasia	Thomasia gardneri	near Mount Holland, Western Australia	Only known from the holotype collected in 1929.

==== Banana trees (family Musaceae) ====
Common name	Scientific name	Range	Comments
Daintree's river banana	Musa fitzalanii	Daintree River, northeast Queensland	Only known from the holotype collected in 1875.

==== Willowherbs (family Onagraceae) ====
===== Locally extinct =====
Common name	Scientific name	Range	Comments
Carpet willow-herb	Epilobium willisii	Tasmania and the Lankeys Plain on the Dargo High Plains of Victoria	Extinct in Victoria, survives in Tasmania.

==== Orchids (family Orchidaceae) ====
Common name	Scientific name	Range	Comments
	Acianthus ledwardii	Burleigh Heads, Queensland	Last collected in 1938.
Short Spider-orchid	Caladenia brachyscapa	Warrnambool, Victoria and Clarke Island, Tasmania	Last collected in Clarke Island in 1979.
Magnificent spider-orchid	Caladenia magnifica	Central Victoria	Last recorded in 1979.
	Caladenia thysanochila	Mount Eliza, Victoria	Only known from two individuals collected in 1988.
	Diuris bracteata	near Gladesville, Sydney, New South Wales	Only known from the type specimen collected before 1889. Claimed individuals collected after 1998 actually belong to Diuris platichila.
Lilac leek-orchid	Prasophyllum colemaniarum	Bayswater, Victoria	Only known from the type series collected in 1922.

===== Locally extinct =====
Common name	Scientific name	Range	Comments	Pictures
Common elbow orchid	Arthrochilus huntianus	Southeastern Australia	Extirpated from Flinders Island.	
Thick-lipped spider-orchid	Caladenia cardiochila	Southeastern Australia	Extirpated from Flinders Island, where it was recorded in 1947.	

==== Broomrapes (family Orobanchaceae) ====
Common name	Scientific name	Range	Comments
Subshrub	Euphrasia ruptura	New South Wales	Listed as extinct in 2025.

==== True grasses (family Poaceae) ====
Scientific name	Range	Comments
Amphibromus whitei	near Roma, Queensland	Listed as extinct in 2000.
Deyeuxia lawrencei	possibly near Launceston, Tasmania	Only known from the holotype collected in 1831.
Paspalum batianoffii	Port Curtis, Queensland	Listed as extinct since 2000.

==== Pondweeds (family Potamogetonaceae) ====
===== Locally extinct =====
Common name	Scientific name	Range	Comments
Austral water-mat	Althenia australis	Western and southern Australia	Extirpated from Tasmania.

==== Primroses (family Primulaceae) ====
Scientific name	Range	Comments
Embelia flueckigeri	Russell River, Queensland	Only known from the holotype collected in 1892.

==== Proteas (family Proteaceae) ====
Scientific name	Range	Comments	Pictures
Persoonia laxa	Beaches of Sydney, New South Wales	Last collected in Newport in 1908. An intermediate individual collected in Dee Why in 1922 could be a hybrid of P. laxa and P. levis.	
Persoonia prostrata	Queensland	Listed as extinct in 2000.	

===== Locally extinct =====
Common name	Scientific name	Range	Comments	Pictures
Coast banksia	Banksia integrifolia integrifolia	Eastern Australia from Bundaberg, Queensland to Geelong, Victoria	Once also found on islands on the Bass Strait, where it is extinct now.	

==== Coffee and relatives (family Rubiaceae) ====
Common name	Scientific name	Range	Comments
Esperance dog weed	Opercularia acolytantha	north of Esperance, Western Australia	Only known from the holotype collected in 1901.
	Wendlandia psychotrioides	Mount Bellenden Ker, Queensland	Last recorded in 1887.

==== Mistletoes and sandalwoods (family Santalaceae) ====
===== Possibly extinct =====
Common name	Scientific name	Range	Comments
Diels' currant bush	Leptomeria dielsiana	Scott River, Western Australia	Last collected in 1957.

===== Locally extinct =====
Common name	Scientific name	Range	Comments
Austral toadflax	Thesium australe	Southeastern Australia	Extirpated from Tasmania.

==== Nightshades (family Solanaceae) ====
Common name	Scientific name	Range	Comments
Bridal flower	Solanum bauerianum	Lord Howe and Norfolk Islands	Listed as extinct in 2018.

==== Triggerplants (family Stylidiaceae) ====
===== Locally extinct =====
Common name	Scientific name	Range	Comments	Pictures
Hairy stylewort	Levenhookia dubia	Western and southern Australia	Extirpated from Tasmania.	

== See also ==
- Fauna of Australia
- Threatened fauna of Australia
- Lazarus taxon
- List of New Zealand species extinct in the Holocene
- List of Hawaiian species extinct in the Holocene
- List of Oceanian species extinct in the Holocene
- List of recently extinct mammals
- List of extinct bird species since 1500
- Lists of extinct species
