= Capricorn rabbit rat =

Conservation status
- Extinct (Quaternary) (IUCN 3.1)

Scientific classification
- Kingdom: Animalia
- Phylum: Chordata
- Class: Mammalia
- Infraclass: Placentalia
- Order: Rodentia
- Family: Muridae
- Genus: Conilurus
- Species: †C. capricornensis

Binomial name
- †Conilurus capricornensis Cramb & Hocknull, 2010

Extinct species of rodent

The Capricorn rabbit rat (Conilurus capricornensis) is an extinct species of rodent from Queensland, Australia. It was described as a new species in 2010 on the basis of Pleistocene and Holocene dental remains. The specific name refers to the Capricorn Caves in Queensland, one of the locations where remains were unearthed. Some of the subfossil material post-dates the European settlement of Australia, so the Capricorn rabbit rat is a modern extinction. As of 29 September 2024, the Capricorn rabbit rat has been classed as "Extinct" by IUCN Red List.

== Description ==
The Capricorn rabbit rat is larger than other rabbit rat (Conilurus) species. Also, unique dental features distinguish it from the white-footed rabbit rat (Conilurus albipes) and the brush-tailed rabbit rat (Conilurus penicillatus).

== See also ==
- List of Australian species extinct in the Holocene
- Lists of extinct species
- Fauna of Australia
- Threatened fauna of Australia
- List of recently extinct mammals
