= Acid drop =

Acid drop or acid drops may refer to:

- Acid Drop (game), an Atari 2600 game
- Acid drop, a skateboard trick credited to Duane Peters
- Acid drop, a candy or sweet coated with sour sanding
- "Acid Drops", a song from the album That What Is Not by Public Image Ltd
- Acid Drops, a book by Kenneth Williams
- Acid Drops, a play by Gertrude E. Jennings
- Leptomeria acida, an Australian parasitic shrub

== See also ==
- Operation Acid Drop, a World War II operation
