= Small snake orchid =

Small snake orchid is a common name for several plants and may refer to:

- Diuris chryseopsis, endemic to south-eastern Australia
- Diuris pedunculata, endemic to New South Wales

== See also ==
- Snake orchid
