= Brush-tailed rat =

Brush-tailed rat is a common name for several mammals and may refer to:

- Isothrix, a genus of five species primarily found in the Amazon Basin
- Octodon degus, a species native to Chile, which appears in the exotic pet trade

== See also ==
- Brush-tailed rabbit rat
