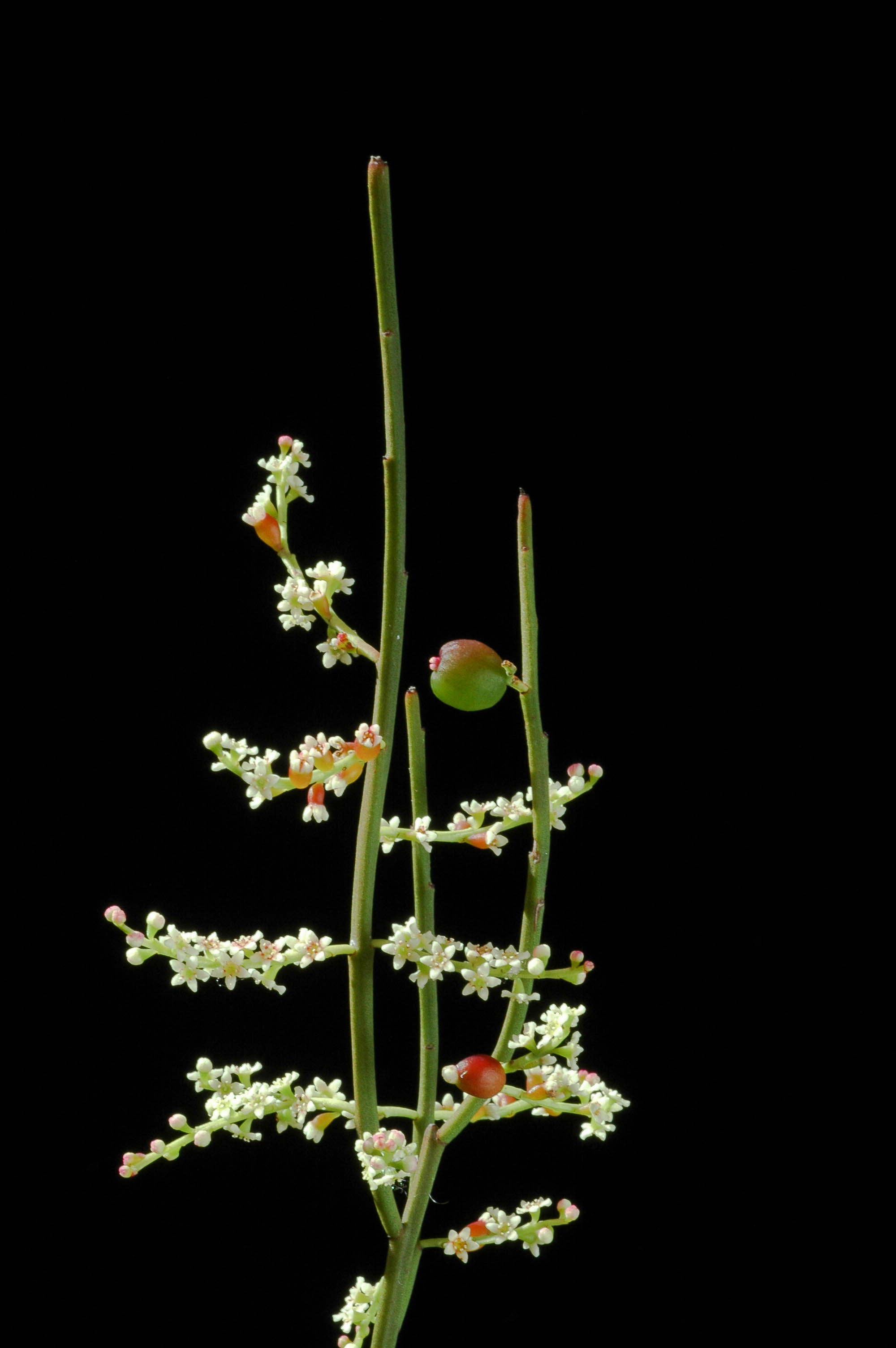
- Photo courtesy of Rob Wiltshire

Conservation status
- Least Concern (IUCN 3.1)

Scientific classification
- Kingdom: Plantae
- Clade: Embryophytes
- Clade: Tracheophytes
- Clade: Spermatophytes
- Clade: Angiosperms
- Clade: Eudicots
- Order: Santalales
- Family: Santalaceae
- Genus: Leptomeria
- Species: L. drupacea

Binomial name
- Leptomeria drupacea (Labill.) Druce
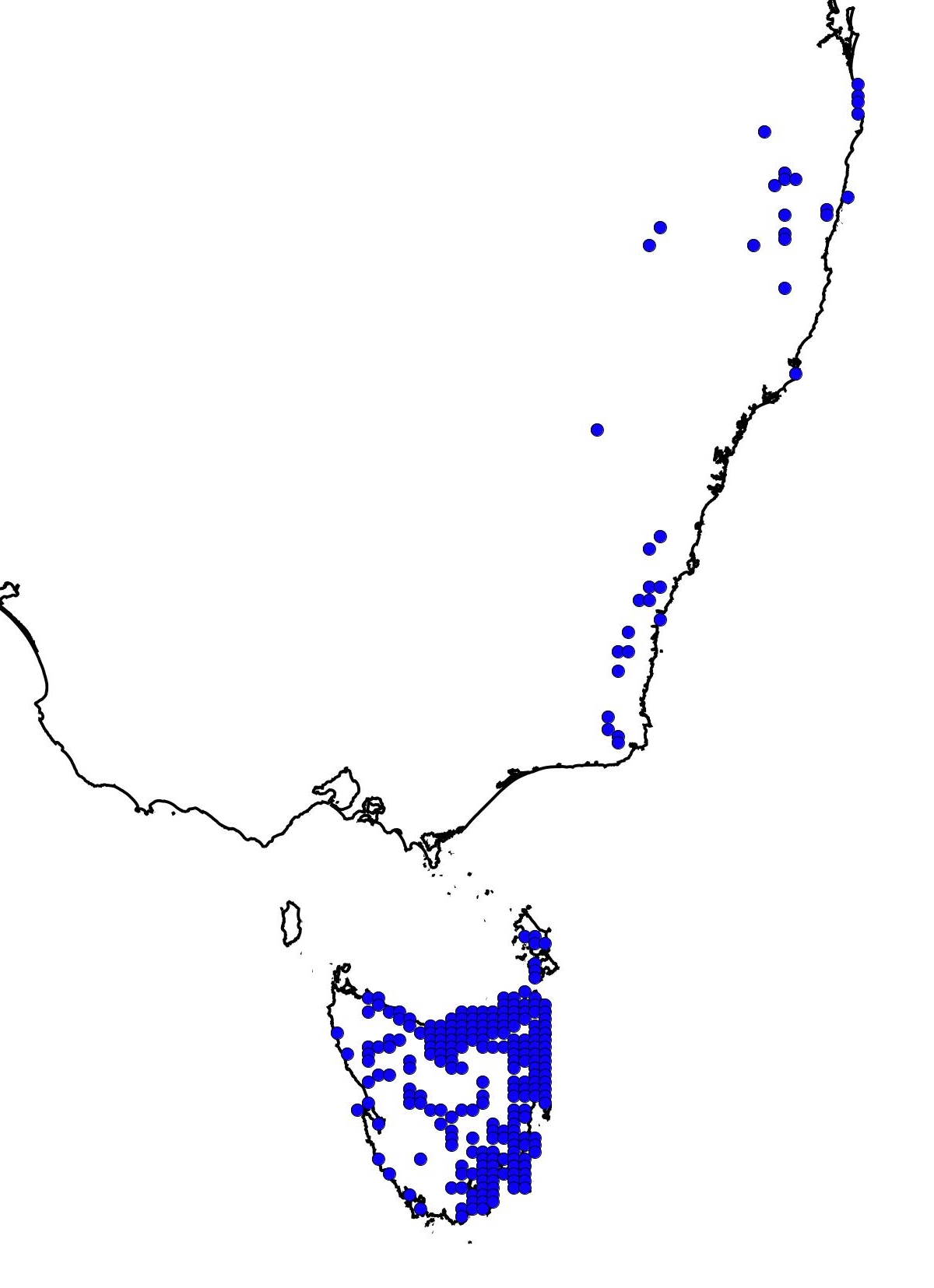
- Map of Southern Australia, with blue circles indicating species occurrence. Sourced from Atlas of Living Australia

Synonyms
- Leptomeria billardierei R.Br.; Leptomeria billardierei var. humilis Hook.f.; Thesium drupaceum Labill.

= Leptomeria drupacea =

Species of flowering plant

Leptomeria drupacea, also known as the pale currant bush, is an endemic Australian hemi-parasitic erect shrub. It occurs commonly in dry woodlands across Tasmania Australia and in some parts of Victoria and Queensland. It has long yellowish-green slender branchlets that often give a broom-like appearance.

== Description ==
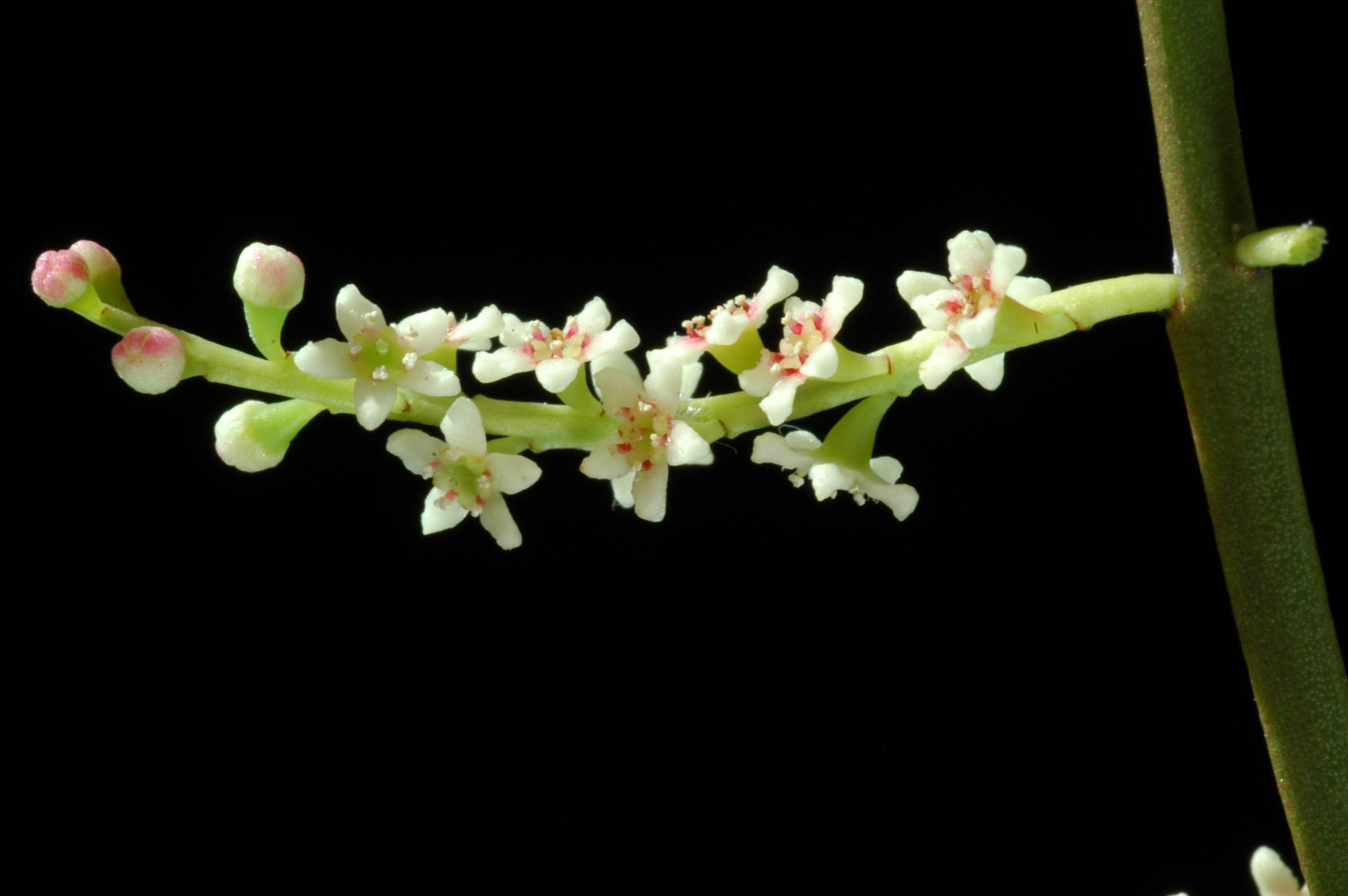
Leptomeria drupacea flowers Photo courtesy of Rob Wiltshire

Leptomeria drupacea is an upright green shrub that can grow up to 3m. Its flexible, almost cylindrical branchlets have longitudinal ridges, and its leaves and bracts are sessile and scale-like with a truncate base and a narrowly acute apex; 0.71mm long, 0.30mm wide.

Its flowers are bisexual and are arranged into a raceme of around 10-16 flowers, which is typically inserted laterally to the branchlets. The pedicel of the flowers is obscure and hard to differentiate from the floral tube. The white to cream tepals (flushed reddish-pink upon ageing), 0.61mm long, are concave with an incurved and adaxially thickened apex that forms a hood with tiny hairs on the adaxial surface, restricted to small tufts. The floral disk is deeply lobed with a diameter of 0.60mm and the anthers, filaments and style are typically 0.10- 0.15mm long.

The smooth drupe, 3-6mm, are oval to almost round with a fleshy thick epicarp. The drupes start green, ripen reddish and are edible. Flowering occurs late spring to summer.

== Taxonomy ==
Leptomeria drupacea is part of the Santalaceae family which includes around 30 different genera and 400 species across the world in tropical and temperate regions. This family was first described in 1810 in Robert Brown’s Prodromus Flore Novae Holllandiae, which was based on specimens collected in 1802-1805 whilst on the Matthew Flinder’s circumcontinental voyage to Australia. The Australian endemic genus Lemptomeria, from the Greek word ‘leptos’ meaning slender and ‘meros’ meaning part, referencing to the slender branches, consists of 17 different species in the southern parts of Australia. The species name Drupacea is derived from the Latin meaning 'like a drupe’.

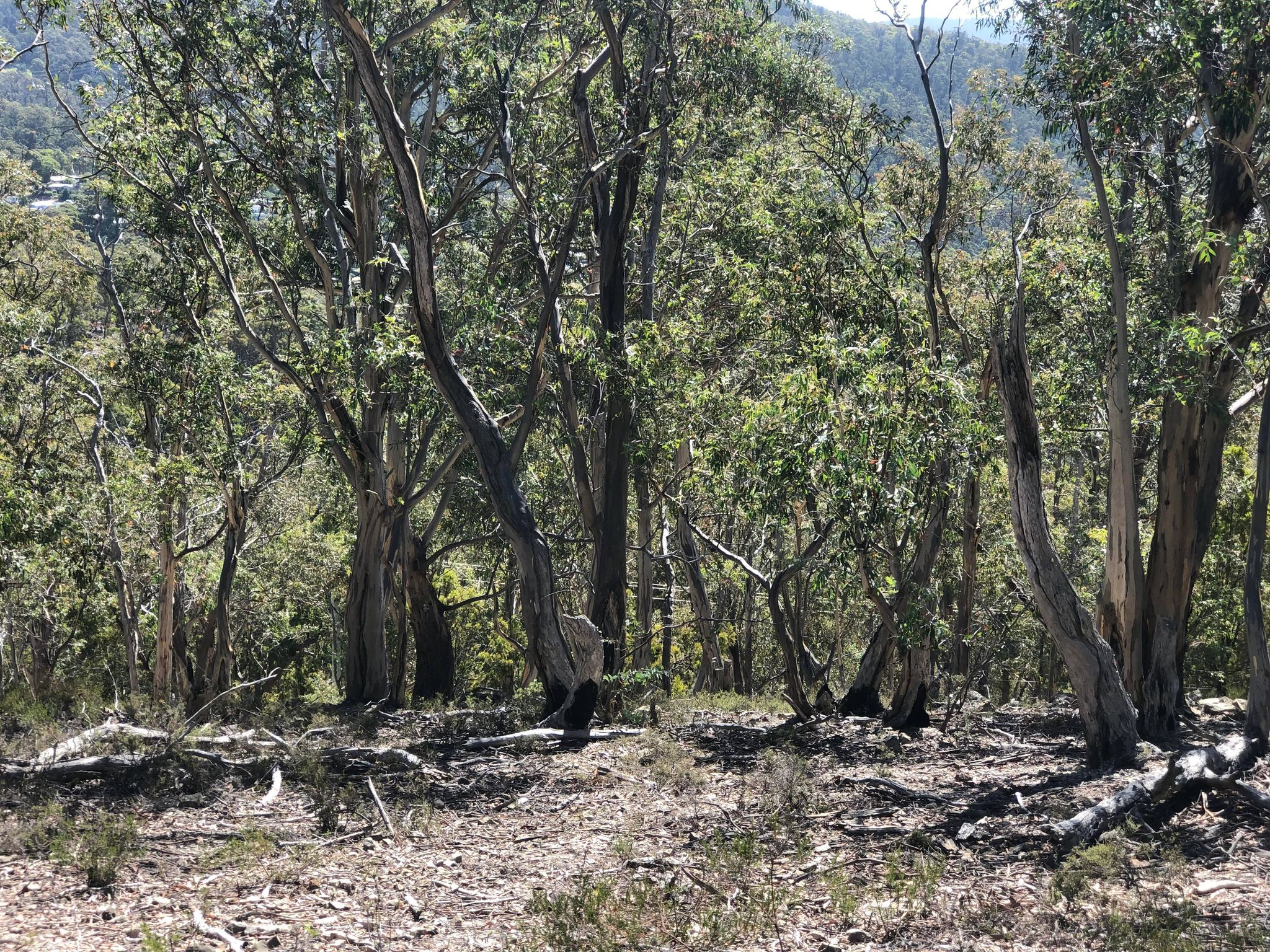
Typical woodland in Tasmania where Leptomeria drupacea is found

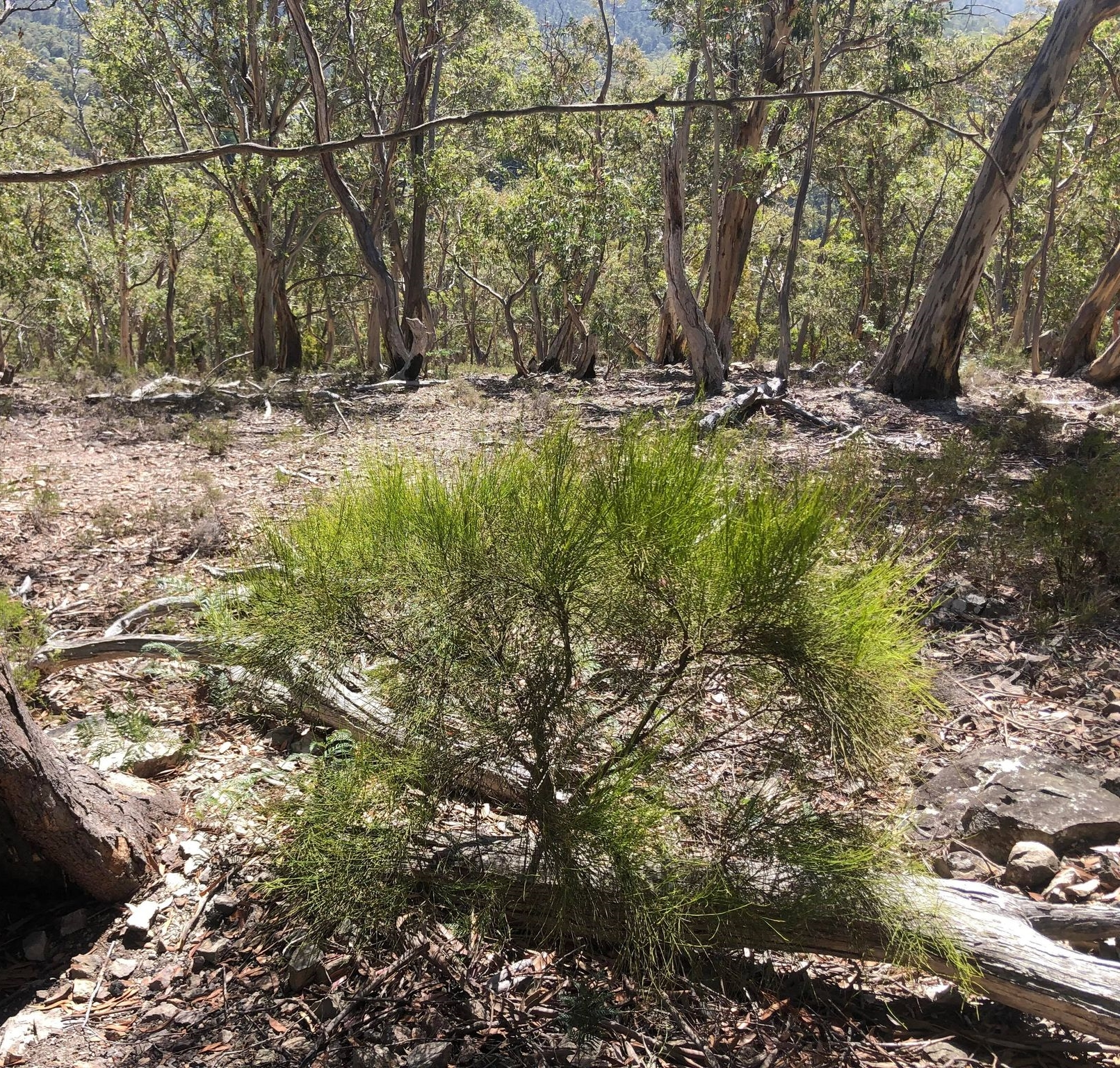
Leptomeria drupacea habit

== Distribution and habitat ==
Leptomeria drupacea is found in open eucalypt forests and woodlands, heath or heath-sedgelands, and sandy communities across eastern mainland Australia and Tasmania alongside eucalypts, wattles and banksias.

== Ecology ==
=== Parasitism ===
The order Santalales is one of the largest groups of parasitic plants. These plants are functionally specialised to acquire essential nutrients through attaching to "host" plants via a modified root called a haustorium.

Leptomeria drupacea is considered a hemiparasite. Unlike holoparasites, hemiparasites are not completely dependent on hosts because they can produce some of their own sugars via photosynthesis. Parasitism allows these plants to establish in environments where nutrient availability is poor.

== Other species ==
Out of the 17 Leptomeria species, there are only four species that have white flowers like L. drupacea; L. glomerata, L. pachyclada, L. pauciflora and L. preissiana.

Of these four species, only one crosses over in its distribution and shares a similar habit, L. glomerata. The best way to distinguish between the species is by their height and the number of flowers in an inflorescence. L. glomerata are typically no taller than 30cm and have 1-10 flowers in an inflorescence whereas L. drupacea can grow up to 3 metres and have typically more than 10 flowers in an inflorescence.

Leptomeria drupacea is also often confused with L. acida due to the tepals flushing pink as they age. Therefore, best way to segregate from this species with reddish or green tepals is by counting 10-16 flowers in an inflorescence, and observing a prominently lobed floral disk.
