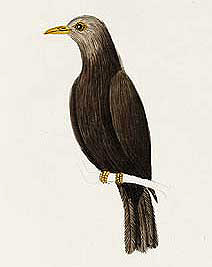
- Nominate subspecies from Norfolk Island became extinct in 1975

Scientific classification
- Kingdom: Animalia
- Phylum: Chordata
- Class: Aves
- Order: Passeriformes
- Family: Turdidae
- Genus: Turdus
- Species: †T. poliocephalus

Binomial name
- †Turdus poliocephalus Latham, 1801

Subspecies
- See text

= Tasman Sea island thrush =

Species of bird

The Tasman Sea island thrush (Turdus poliocephalus) is an extinct forest bird in the thrush family that was formerly found on Lord Howe Island and Norfolk Island in the Pacific Ocean. It is part of the "island thrush" complex that has been split into 17 species based on a molecular phylogenetic study published in 2023. The two subspecies of the Tasman Sea island thrush became extinct in historical times.

== Taxonomy ==
The Tasman Sea island thrush was formally described in 1801 by the English ornithologist John Latham based on a specimen that had been collected on Norfolk Island in the Pacific Ocean. He coined the binomial name Turdus poliocephalus, where the specific epithet combines the Ancient Greek πολιος/polios meaning "grey" or "grizzled" with -κεφαλος/-kephalos meaning "-headed". The Tasman Sea island thrush, under the name "island thrush", formerly included around 50 subspecies and had a range that extended from the Philippines through the Greater Sundas, Wallacea, and New Guinea to Polynesia. The island thrush complex was split into 17 separate species based on morphological differences and a molecular phylogenetic study published in 2023.

Two subspecies are recognised, both of which are now extinct:

- † Turdus poliocephalus vinitinctus (Gould, 1855) – Lord Howe Island (east of Australia)
- † Turdus poliocephalus poliocephalus Latham, 1801 – Norfolk Island (east of Australia)

== Description ==
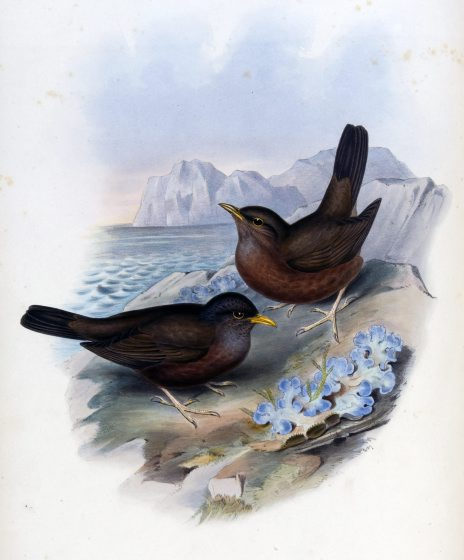
Extinct subspecies from Lord Howe Island

== Conservation ==
The two subspecies have become extinct: T. p. vinitinctus from Lord Howe Island and the nominate race T. p. poliocephalus from Norfolk Island. T. p. poliocephalus was relatively common as recently as 1941, but by 1975 it had become extinct, due to introduced black rats, habitat loss and hybridization following colonisation by the closely related common blackbird.
