= Leptomeria aphylla =

Scientific classification
- Kingdom: Plantae
- Clade: Tracheophytes
- Clade: Angiosperms
- Clade: Eudicots
- Order: Santalales
- Family: Santalaceae
- Genus: Leptomeria
- Species: L. aphylla

Binomial name
- Leptomeria aphylla R.Br.

Species of plant

Leptomeria aphylla, commonly known as leafless currant-bush is a shrub that is native to south-eastern Australia.

The species was formally described in 1810 by botanist Robert Brown in Prodromus Florae Novae Hollandiae, based on plant material collected at Memory Cove in South Australia.

The small acidic fruits were eaten by indigenous Australians.
