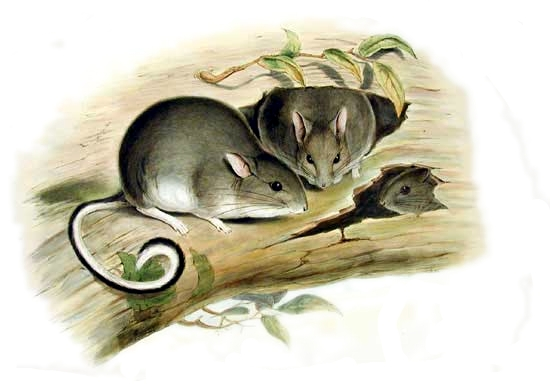
- Conilurus albipes

Scientific classification
- Kingdom: Animalia
- Phylum: Chordata
- Class: Mammalia
- Order: Rodentia
- Family: Muridae
- Tribe: Hydromyini
- Genus: Conilurus; Ogilby, 1838

Species
- †Conilurus albipes †Conilurus capricornensis Conilurus penicillatus

= Conilurus =

Rabbit rats Temporal range: Early Pleistocene - Recent

Genus of rodents

The rabbit rats of genus Conilurus represent an unusual genus of Old World rats from Australia, New Guinea, and Melville Island.

Head and body are 16.5–20 cm. Tail length is 18–21.5 cm. The tail is haired and has a distinct tuft at the end. These nocturnal animals are found in habitats ranging from coastal areas, swamps, plains, and forests. They have been reported along the edge of oceanic surf, presumably feeding.

Young have been found to cling to one of the mother's four nipples while she forages. Gestation is 33–35 days.

== Species ==
Genus Conilurus - rabbit rats

- †White-footed rabbit rat, Conilurus albipes
- †Capricorn rabbit rat, Conilurus capricornensis
- Brush-tailed rabbit rat, Conilurus penicillatus
