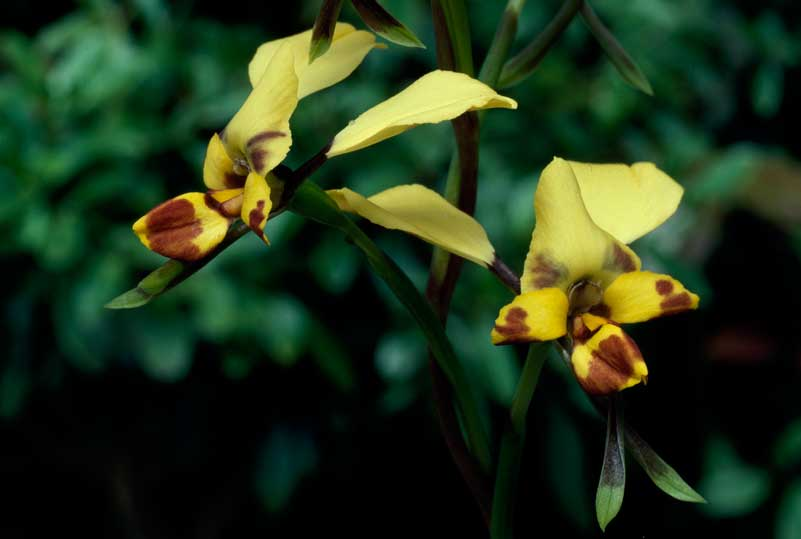

Scientific classification
- Kingdom: Plantae
- Clade: Tracheophytes
- Clade: Angiosperms
- Clade: Monocots
- Order: Asparagales
- Family: Orchidaceae
- Subfamily: Orchidoideae
- Tribe: Diurideae
- Genus: Diuris
- Species: D. platichila

Binomial name
- Diuris platichila Fitzg.

Synonyms
- Diuris cuneilabris Rupp; Diuris curtifolia Rupp; Diuris flavopurpurea Messmer; Diuris lineata Messmer; Diuris platichilus Fitzg. orth. var.

= Diuris platichila =

Blue Mountains doubletail

Species of orchid

Diuris platichila, commonly known as the Blue Mountains doubletail, is a species of orchid that is endemic to a few isolated places in the Blue Mountains in New South Wales. It has two leaves and up to eight yellow flowers with dark markings on the dorsal sepal and labellum. It has relatively long, thin lateral sepals and the central lobe of the labellum is wedge-shaped. It forms hybrids with other species of Diuris.

== Description ==
Diuris platichila is a tuberous, perennial herb with two linear leaves 150–400 mm (6–20 in) long, 3–6 mm (0.1–0.2 in) wide and folded lengthwise. Between two and eight yellow flowers with dark markings on the dorsal sepal and labellum, 20–30 mm (0.8–1 in) wide are borne on a flowering stem 300–500 mm (10–20 in) tall. The dorsal sepal is erect, 8–11 mm (0.3–0.4 in) long and 6–8 mm (0.2–0.3 in) wide. The lateral sepals are 14–16 mm (0.55–0.63 in) long, 2–3 mm (0.08–0.1 in) wide and turned downwards. The petals are erect, egg-shaped to elliptic, 9–12 mm (0.4–0.5 in) long and 6–8 mm (0.2–0.3 in) wide on a reddish brown stalk 4–6 mm (0.16–0.24 in) long. The labellum is 9–12 mm (0.4–0.5 in) long and has three lobes. The centre lobe is wedge-shaped, 7–9 mm (0.3–0.4 in) long and wide and folded lengthwise. The side lobes are 4–6 mm (0.16–0.24 in) long and about 2 mm (0.08 in) wide. There are two thick callus ridges 4–5 mm (0.16–0.20 in) long near the mid-line of the labellum. Flowering occurs in September and October.

== Taxonomy and naming ==
Diuris platichila was first formally described in 1888 by Robert FitzGerald and the description was published in his book Australian Orchids.

== Distribution and habitat ==
The Blue Mountains doubletail grows in isolated populations in the Blue Mountains. It was previously more common in the area but has declined due to habitat loss and hybridisation with other species, including D. chryseopsis and D. bracteata.
