= Snake orchid =

Snake orchid is a common name for several plants and may refer to:

- Cymbidium suave, of eastern Australia
- Prasophyllum elatum, endemic to Australia
- Vanilla barbellata, from southern Florida to the Caribbean

== See also ==
- Small snake orchid
