= Diuris bracteata =

Conservation status
- Extinct (EPBC Act)

Scientific classification
- Kingdom: Plantae
- Clade: Tracheophytes
- Clade: Angiosperms
- Clade: Monocots
- Order: Asparagales
- Family: Orchidaceae
- Subfamily: Orchidoideae
- Tribe: Diurideae
- Genus: Diuris
- Species: †D. bracteata

Binomial name
- †Diuris bracteata Fitzg.

Species of orchid

Diuris bracteata is a species of orchid that is endemic to New South Wales. It has two folded leaves and up to eight yellow flowers with blackish marks. After its collection in a Sydney suburb in 1888, no further collections were made and the species was presumed extinct until 2004 when it was rediscovered near Gosford.

== Description ==
Diuris bracteata is a tuberous, perennial herb with two linear leaves 80–120 mm (3–5 in) long, 6–10 mm (0.2–0.4 in) wide and folded lengthwise. Between two and eight, usually three yellow flowers with blackish markings, 15–20 mm (0.6–0.8 in) wide are borne on a flowering stem 100–180 mm (4–7 in) tall. There are about five curved, linear bracts along the flowering stem. The dorsal sepal is more or less erect, egg-shaped, 6–8 mm (0.2–0.3 in) long and 5–6 mm (0.20–0.24 in) wide with two brown blotches near the base. The lateral sepals are linear, 9–12 mm (0.4–0.5 in) long, 1.5–3 mm (0.06–0.1 in) wide, turned downwards and are parallel to or cross over each other. The petals are ear-like with an elliptic to egg-shaped blade 6–7 mm (0.2–0.3 in) long and about 5 mm (0.2 in) wide on a blackish stalk 4–5 mm (0.16–0.20 in) long. The labellum is 5–7 mm (0.2–0.3 in) long and has three lobes. The centre lobe is egg-shaped to diamond-shaped, 5–6 mm (0.20–0.24 in) long and wide and the side lobes are linear to oblong, 3–4 mm (0.1–0.2 in) long and about 2 mm (0.08 in) wide. There are two ridge-like calli about 5 mm (0.2 in) in the mid-line of the labellum. Flowering occurs in August and September.

== Taxonomy and naming ==
Diuris bracteata was first formally described in 1888 by Robert D. FitzGerald from a specimen collected near Gladesville by Henry Deane. The description was published in Fitzgerald's book, Australian Orchids. The specific epithet (bracteata) is a Latin word meaning "small leaf".

== Distribution and habitat ==
This orchid occurs in grassy woodland and forest near Gosford.

== Conservation ==
No specimens of this species were collected in the twentieth century and in the year 2000 it was listed as "extinct" under the Australian Government Environment Protection and Biodiversity Conservation Act 1999 (EPBC Act). Some specimens collected in the Sydney region in 1998 and subsequently, have been re-examined and found to be Diuris platichila. The species is listed as "endangered" under the New South Wales Biodiversity Conservation Act 2016. The threats to its survival include its small population size and limited distribution, and disturbance associated with roadworks since some populations occur on roadsides.
