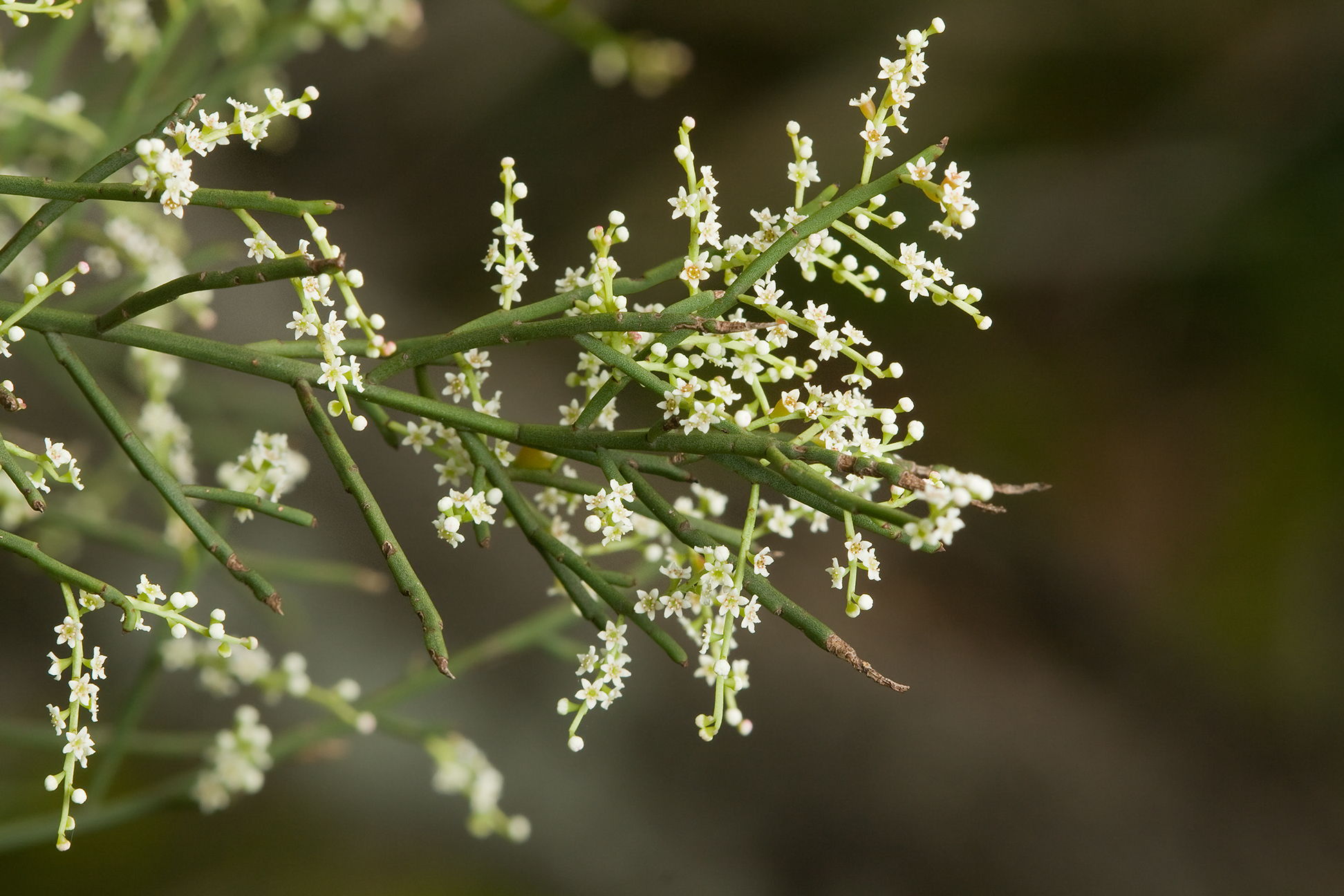
- Leptomeria drupacea

Scientific classification
- Kingdom: Plantae
- Clade: Tracheophytes
- Clade: Angiosperms
- Clade: Eudicots
- Order: Santalales
- Family: Santalaceae
- Genus: Leptomeria; R.Br.

Species
- See text

= Leptomeria =

Genus of flowering plants in the mistletoe family

Leptomeria is a genus of flowering plants, endemic to Australia. Species include:

- Leptomeria acida R.Br. – Native currant, sour currant bush
- Leptomeria aphylla R.Br.
- Leptomeria axillaris R.Br.
- Leptomeria cunninghamii Miq.
- Leptomeria dielsiana Pilg. – Diel's currant bush
- Leptomeria drupacea (Labill.) Druce
- Leptomeria ellytes Lepschi
- Leptomeria empetriformis Miq.
- Leptomeria furtiva Lepschi
- Leptomeria glomerata F.Muell. ex Hook.f.
- Leptomeria hirtella Miq.
- Leptomeria lehmannii Miq.
- Leptomeria pachyclada Diels
- Leptomeria pauciflora R.Br. – Sparse-flowered currant bush
- Leptomeria preissiana (Miq.) A.DC.
- Leptomeria scrobiculata R.Br.
- Leptomeria squarrulosa R.Br.
