= Persoonia laxa =

Conservation status
- Extinct (EPBC Act)

Scientific classification
- Kingdom: Plantae
- Clade: Tracheophytes
- Clade: Angiosperms
- Clade: Eudicots
- Order: Proteales
- Family: Proteaceae
- Genus: Persoonia
- Species: †P. laxa

Binomial name
- †Persoonia laxa L.A.S.Johnson & P.H.Weston

Synonyms
- Persoonia nutans subsp. b sensu jacobs & pickard

Species of shrub

Persoonia laxa is an extinct shrub of the family Proteaceae native to the Sydney region in eastern Australia. It was only known from two specimens, the holotype found in Newport in 1907, and the other specimen collected in Manly the following year, with no individuals being found since. It was declared extinct by the Environmental Protection and Biodiversity Conservation Act 1999 in 2000 and by the International Union for Conservation of Nature in 2020.

== Description ==
Persoonia laxa grew as a spreading or prostrate shrub with smooth bark. The flat leaves were 8–15 mm long and 1–1.8 mm wide and linear in shape. The leaf margins were recurved. The new growth is covered in sparse hairs. P. laxa has an auxotelic inflorescence, the flowers occur in groups of one to three, with pedicels 6-8mm long. mostly subtended by leaves. Each individual flower consists of a cylindrical perianth, consisting of tepals fused for most of their length, within which are both male and female parts. The tepals are 8–9 mm (0.31–0.35 in) long and smooth on the outside. The central style is surrounded by the anther, which splits into four segments; these curl back and resemble a cross when viewed from above.

Because of limited observation prior to its extinction, little is known about its flowering and fruit.

== Taxonomy ==
Two specimens of P. laxa were collected in what are now Sydney's Northern Beaches—one from Newport in November 1907 and the other from Manly in June 1908. The genus was reviewed by Peter Weston for the Flora of Australia treatment in 1995, and P. laxa was placed in the Lanceolata group, a group of 54 closely related species with similar flowers but very different foliage. These species will often interbreed with each other where two members of the group occur, A third specimen, collected in 1922 from Dee Why, appears to be intermediate between (and is possibly a hybrid of) P. laxa and P. levis.

== Distribution and habitat ==
Occurring in Newport and Manly in central-eastern N.S.W, P. laxa was thought to have been a component of heath or dry sclerophyll eucalypt woodland or forest on sandstone soils, or possibly in sandy soils on the coast. P. laxa grew at an altitude of 0–20 m with an annual rainfall of 1200–1400 mm.

== Extinction ==
Persoonia laxa is listed as extinct on the IUCN Red List of Threatened Species and under the Australian Environment Protection and Biodiversity Conservation Act 1999 (EPBC Act). The reasons are unknown, though the area in which it was found has become very urbanised, causing the clearance of its habitat for land development, likely resulting in the species' demise.
