= Solanum bauerianum =

Scientific classification
- Kingdom: Plantae
- Clade: Tracheophytes
- Clade: Angiosperms
- Clade: Eudicots
- Clade: Asterids
- Order: Solanales
- Family: Solanaceae
- Genus: Solanum
- Species: S. bauerianum

Binomial name
- Solanum bauerianum Endl.

Extinct species of flowering plant

Solanum bauerianum, also known as bridal flower, is an extinct species in the plant family Solanaceae. It was endemic to Lord Howe Island and Norfolk Island. Convict artist John Doody painted this species around 1792 and commented that it would be a great acquisition for greenhouses in England. Ferdinand Bauer collected the type specimen in 1804. This species was last collected on Norfolk Island in 1830 by Allan Cunningham.
