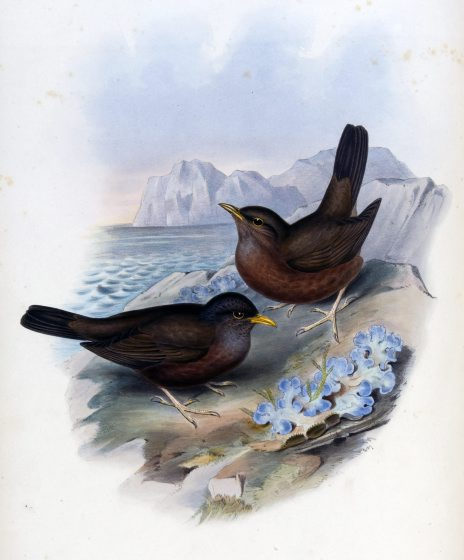
- By John Gould

Conservation status
- Extinct (EPBC Act)

Scientific classification
- Kingdom: Animalia
- Phylum: Chordata
- Class: Aves
- Order: Passeriformes
- Family: Turdidae
- Genus: Turdus
- Species: T. poliocephalus
- Subspecies: †T. p. vinitinctus

Trinomial name
- †Turdus poliocephalus vinitinctus (Gould, 1855)

Synonyms
- Turdus xanthopus vinitinctus

= Lord Howe thrush =

Extinct subspecies of bird

The Lord Howe thrush (Turdus poliocephalus vinitinctus), also known as the vinous-tinted thrush or vinous-tinted blackbird, is an extinct subspecies of the island thrush (Turdus poliocephalus). It was endemic to Lord Howe Island, an Australian island in the Tasman Sea, where it was also called the doctor bird or ouzel by the islanders.

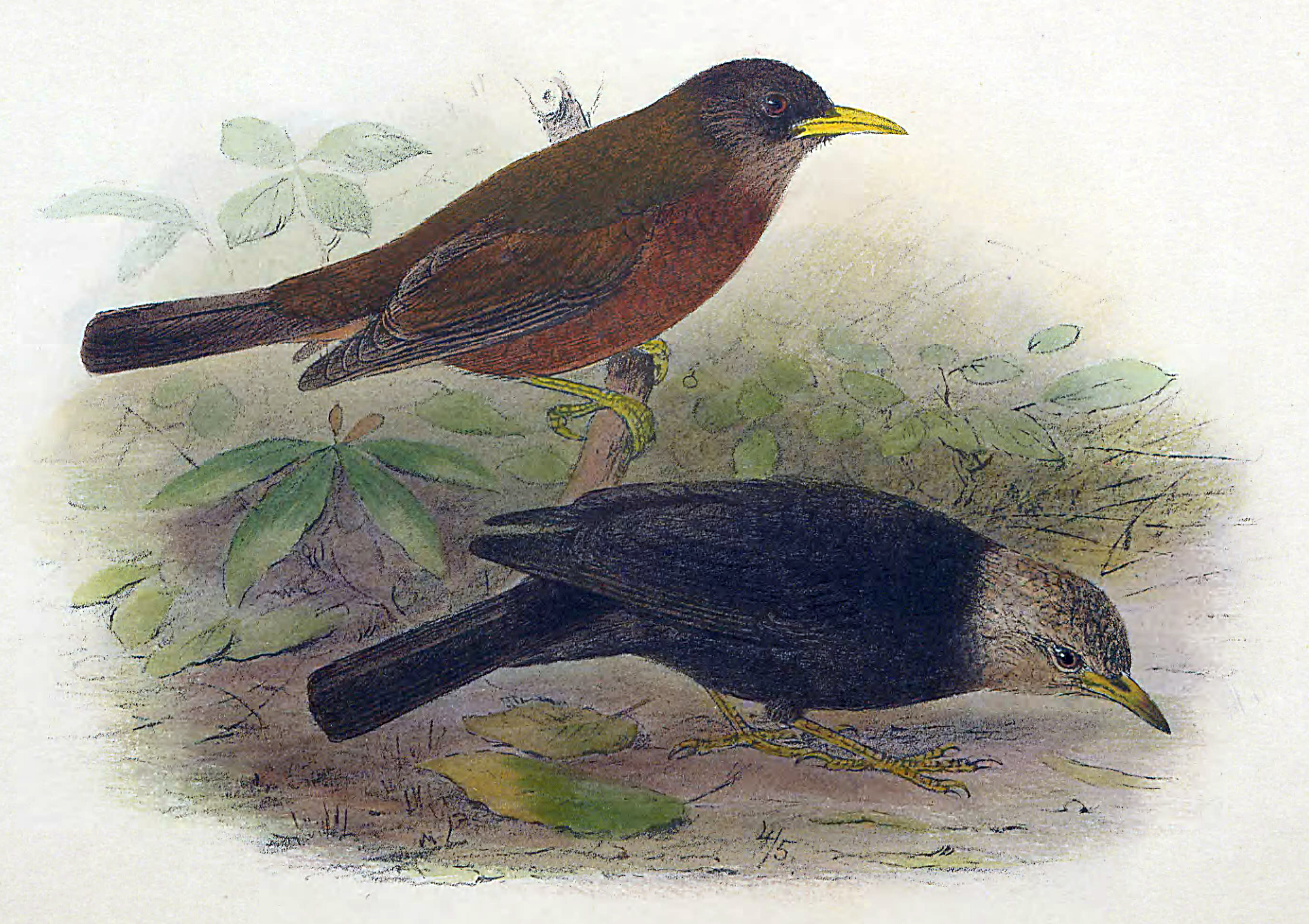
By Henrik Gronvold

It had a length of 22.9 cm. The head was olive-brown. The upperparts were chestnut-brown. Wings and tail were dark brown. Throat and chin were dull brown with an olive tinge. The underparts were chestnut-coloured with a lavender tinge.

It was quite common in 1906 but its population began to diminish in 1913 due to disturbance by man, feral dogs, feral cats, feral pigs and feral goats. When the SS Makambo was shipwrecked on Lord Howe in June 1918, black rats escaped from the vessel and quickly overran the island. With other endemic birds, this ground-nesting bird became extinct within six years.

Museum specimens are on display in Leiden (Netherlands), Tring (United Kingdom), Berlin, New York, Washington and Sydney.
