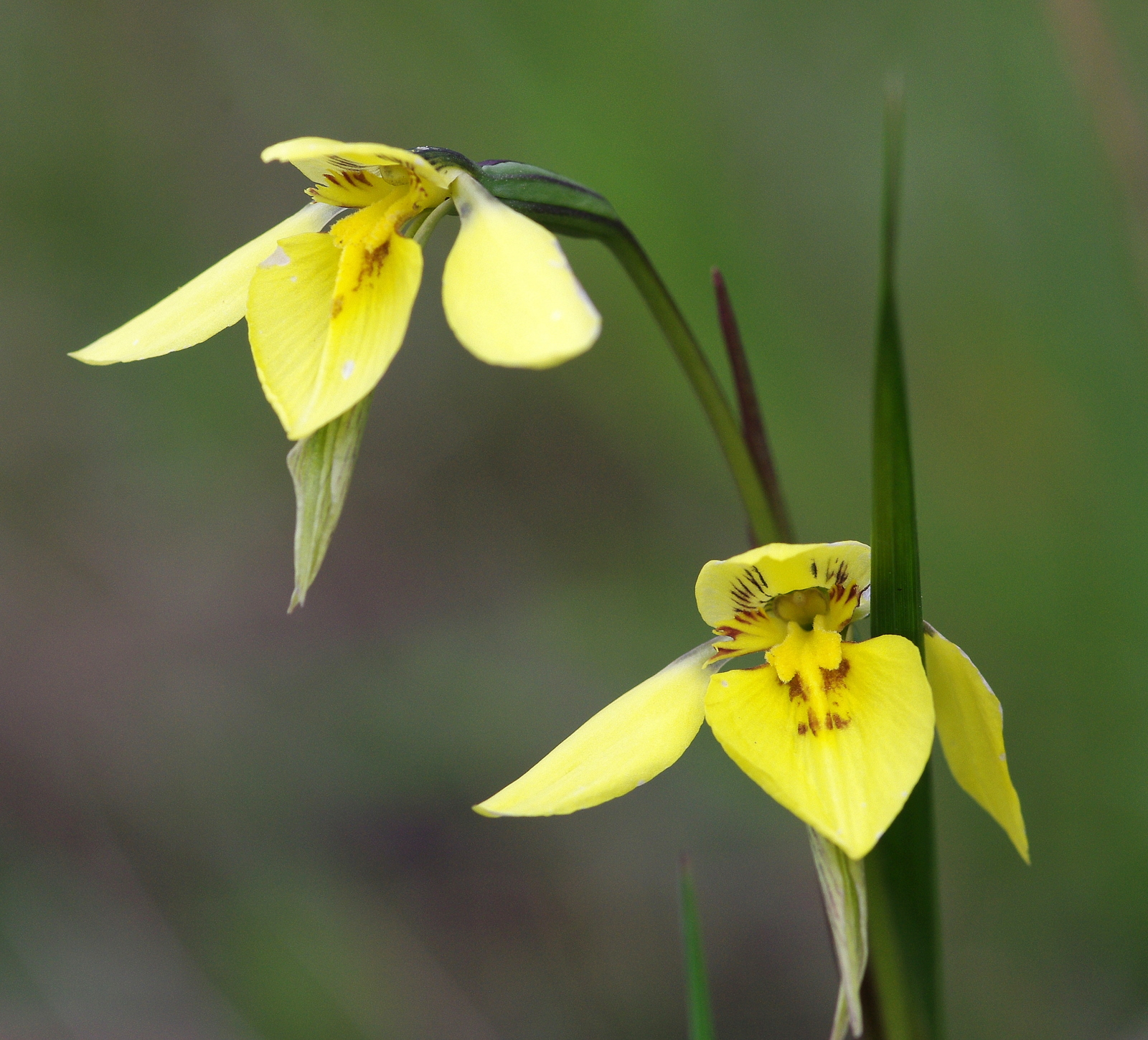

Scientific classification
- Kingdom: Plantae
- Clade: Tracheophytes
- Clade: Angiosperms
- Clade: Monocots
- Order: Asparagales
- Family: Orchidaceae
- Subfamily: Orchidoideae
- Tribe: Diurideae
- Genus: Diuris
- Species: D. chryseopsis

Binomial name
- Diuris chryseopsis D.L.Jones

= Diuris chryseopsis =

Common golden moths

Species of orchid

Diuris chryseopsis, commonly known as common golden moths or small snake orchid, is a species of orchid that is endemic to south-eastern Australia. It is a common and widespread species growing in woodland, often in colonies and has up to four drooping, golden-yellow flowers. It is similar to several other orchids and form hybrids with some other Diuris species.

== Description ==
Diuris chryseopsis is a tuberous, perennial herb with two to five, sometimes up to eight green, linear leaves 50–220 mm (2–9 in) long, 2–3.5 mm (0.08–0.1 in) wide in a loose tuft. Up to four drooping, lemon yellow flowers with brownish markings and 17–30 mm (0.7–1 in) wide are borne on a flowering stem 100–300 mm (4–10 in) tall. The dorsal sepal is more or less erect, egg-shaped to lance-shaped, 10–15 mm (0.4–0.6 in) long, 4–8 mm (0.2–0.3 in) wide. The lateral sepals are linear to lance-shaped, 15–25 mm (0.6–1 in) long, 2–3.5 mm (0.08–0.1 in) wide, and turned downwards. The petals are lance-shaped to narrow egg-shaped, 8–20 mm (0.3–0.8 in) long, 3.5–7 mm (0.1–0.3 in) wide on a blackish stalk 3–5 mm (0.1–0.2 in) long and are directed sideways. The labellum is 14–20 mm (0.6–0.8 in) long and has three lobes. The centre lobe is egg-shaped to heart-shaped, 9–16 mm (0.4–0.6 in) long and 7–12 mm (0.3–0.5 in) wide and the side lobes are oblong to wedge-shaped, 2–3.5 mm (0.08–0.1 in) long and 1–2 mm (0.04–0.08 in) wide. The labellum callus is densely hairy or pimply near its base and tapers towards the tip of the labellum. Flowering occurs from August to October.

== Taxonomy and naming ==
Diuris chryseopsis was first formally described in 1998 by David Jones from a specimen collected in a paddock near the Symmons Plains Raceway. The specific epithet (chryseopsis) is derived from the Ancient Greek words chryseos meaning "golden" and opsis meaning "sight", "look" or "appearance", referring to the colour of the flowers.

== Distribution and habitat ==
Common golden moths grows in moist places in forest, woodland and grassland. It is found in south-eastern New South Wales, Tasmania and in Victoria where it is widespread and common. It may also occur in south-eastern South Australia. It is similar to other Diuris species and often forms hybrids with some that occur in the same area.

== See also ==
- Golden Sun Moth (Synemon plana), a critically endangered moth with a similar name, found in grasslands of South-East Australia.
