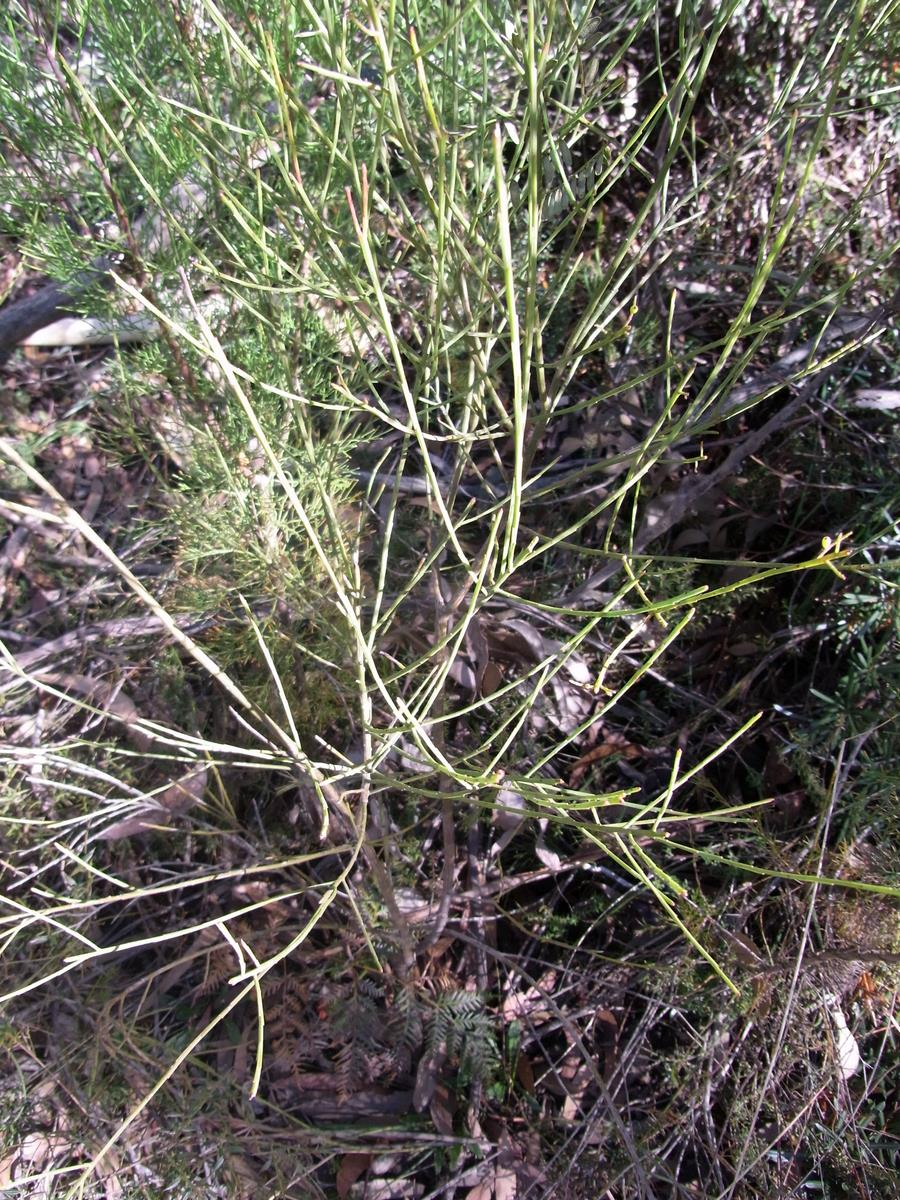
- Blue Mountains National Park, Australia

Scientific classification
- Kingdom: Plantae
- Clade: Tracheophytes
- Clade: Angiosperms
- Clade: Eudicots
- Order: Santalales
- Family: Santalaceae
- Genus: Leptomeria
- Species: L. acida

Binomial name
- Leptomeria acida R.Br.

= Leptomeria acida =

Species of shrub

Leptomeria acida, known as acid drops or sour currant-bush, is an apparently leafless parasitic shrub, found on the coast and ranges in eastern Australia. The habitat is dry eucalyptus woodland, often in sheltered sites. This plant is a root parasite. Branchlets are stiff, angular and spreading. Red flowers form in summer on racemes, 15 to 20 mm long. The fruit is a green or reddish drupe, sometimes tinged with purple. Leaves are tiny, 1 to 2 mm long, though barely noticeable.

The fruits contains vitamin C, and were eaten by Indigenous Australians. They may be used today to make jelly. The specific epithet acida refers to the pleasant acid taste of the fruit.

This plant first appeared in Watkin Tench logbook ″A narrative of the Expedition to Botany Bay″, where the author describe a green currant taste and a grape appearance. Then we find it again in scientific literature in 1810 in the Prodromus Florae Novae Hollandiae, authored by the prolific Scottish botanist, Robert Brown.
