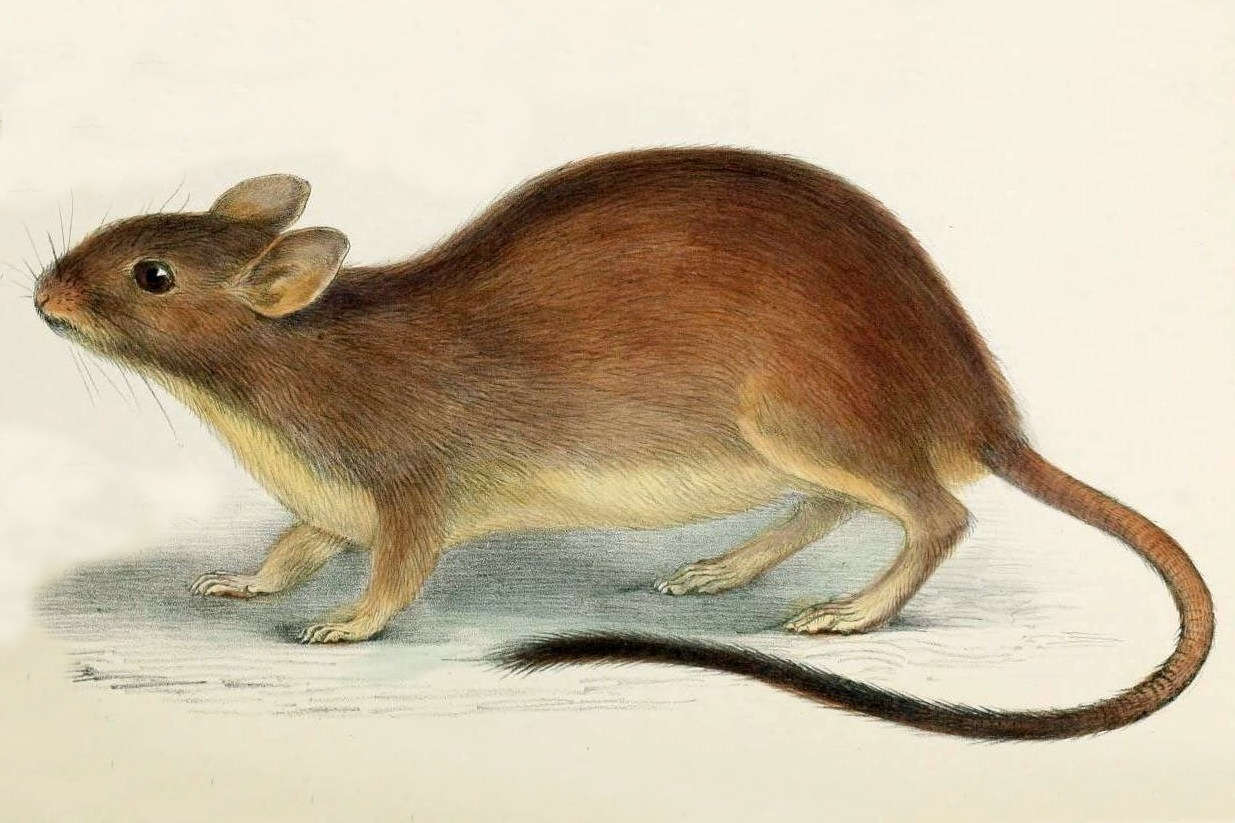

Conservation status
- Vulnerable (IUCN 3.1)

Scientific classification
- Kingdom: Animalia
- Phylum: Chordata
- Class: Mammalia
- Order: Rodentia
- Family: Muridae
- Genus: Conilurus
- Species: C. penicillatus

Binomial name
- Conilurus penicillatus (Gould, 1842)

= Brush-tailed rabbit rat =

Species of rodent

The brush-tailed rabbit rat (Conilurus penicillatus) is a species of rodent in the family Muridae. It is found in Australia and Papua New Guinea.

== Taxonomy ==
The brush-tailed rabbit-rat is one of three Conilurus species that were extant in Australia prior to European colonisation, and represents the sole surviving species of the genus. Two other species, the white-footed rabbit-rat (C. albipes) and the Capricorn rabbit-rat (C. capricornensis), are now extinct. Morphological analysis established three subspecies of C. penicillatus, of which one is on Papua New Guinea and two are present within Australia: one on the Tiwi Islands off the coast of the Northern Territory, and another on the Australian mainland.

== Description ==
The brush-tailed-rabbit-rat is a moderately sized murid rodent, weighing from 116 to 216 g with a head-body length of 135 to 227 mm and a tail length of 102 to 235 mm. Typically individuals are coloured grizzled grey or brown on the upper side of the body, and white to cream coloured on the belly. The long tail ends in a slight brush structure with either a black or white tail tip.

== Behaviour ==
The brush-tailed rabbit-rat is a semi-arboreal, nocturnal species that spends some of its time foraging on the ground. Individuals tend to den in trees such as Eucalyptus miniata and Eucalyptus tetrodonta, as well as hollow logs on the ground. The species makes use of smaller hollows and hollows that are closer to the ground, than other co-occurring and larger-bodied mammal species such as the common brushtail possum (Trichosurus vulpeculus) and the black-footed tree-rat (Mesembriomys gouldii). This may make the brush-tailed rabbit-rat more susceptible to predation and destruction by high-intensity savanna fires than these species.

== Distribution and decline ==
The brush-tailed rabbit-rat has a small, poorly known distribution in Papua New Guinea, and a larger distribution within Australia. The species was formerly much more common and widespread than it is currently. On the Australian mainland, the species has substantially declined, with a study in the Northern Territory finding that its extent of occurrence has declined by more than 65%. The same study found that the species is contracting towards geographic areas that are wetter and lower than where it was found historically. Population declines are not limited to the mainland, with one study finding a 64% reduction in trapping success on the Tiwi Islands between the year 2002 and 2015.

The species has very few contemporary records from the Western Australian portion of the species distribution, but was formerly known from the Mitchell Plateau region of the Kimberley, with sparse records from other areas (e.g Prince Regent National Park). In the Northern Territory, there have been no mainland records from outside of the Cobourg Peninsula in more than ten years. The species was reintroduced to the Darwin region, however this reintroduction attempt failed and the species is also considered extirpated from Kakadu National Park (where many vertebrate species have declined despite the 'protected' status of the region).

Population genomic analysis of the two Australian subspecies found high levels of differentiation among populations, including between the Tiwi Islands of Bathurst and Melville. The same study showed a substantial reduction in relatedness among individuals over 5 km distances, although significant values of spatial autocorrelation of genotypes persisted for distances of more than 100 km. This suggests that individuals tend to disperse much smaller distances than the co-occurring northern quoll (Dasyurus hallucatus), for which significant spatial autocorrelation exists at 500 km. Genetic diversity of the brush-tailed rabbit-rat was found to be highest on Melville Island, followed by Cobourg Peninsula, and lowest on Bathurst Island and at the Mitchell Plateau.
