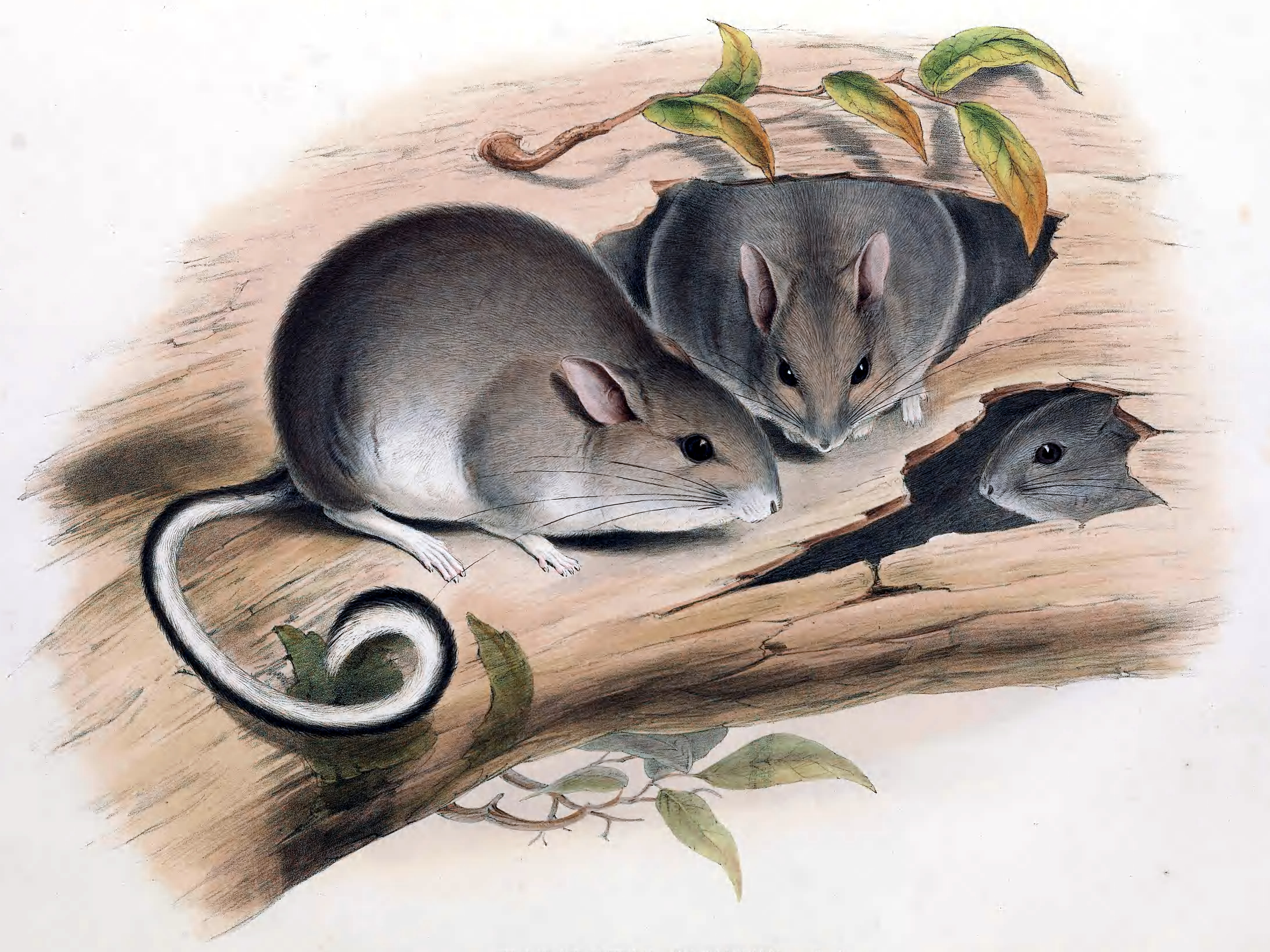

Conservation status
- Extinct (1857) (IUCN 3.1)

Scientific classification
- Kingdom: Animalia
- Phylum: Chordata
- Class: Mammalia
- Order: Rodentia
- Family: Muridae
- Genus: Conilurus
- Species: †C. albipes

Binomial name
- †Conilurus albipes (Lichtenstein, 1829)

= White-footed rabbit rat =

White-footed rabbit-rat

Extinct species of rodent

The white-footed rabbit rat (Conilurus albipes) is an extinct species of rodent, which was originally found in woodlands from Adelaide to Sydney, but became restricted to south-eastern Australia. It was kitten-sized and was one of Australia's largest native rodents. It was nocturnal and lived among trees. It made nests filled with leaves and possibly grass in the limbs of hollow eucalyptus trees. The mother carried her young attached to her teats. In a letter to John Gould, then Governor of South Australia Sir George Grey said that he removed a baby from a teat of its dead mother. The baby clung tightly to Gould's glove.

Sydney natives called it 'gnar-ruck' which translates as 'rabbit-biscuit'. It was a problem in the settlers' stores at about 1788. The last specimen was recorded at about 1845, but some were reported in 1856–57 and perhaps in the 1930s. Rats may have spread diseases or competed for food with the white-footed rabbit rat. Cats may have been predators, while the demise of Aboriginal firestick farming, which maintained woodland, may have made the rabbit rat extinct.

Joyce and McCann, in Burke & Wills - The Scientific Legacy of the Victorian Exploring Expedition (CSIRO Publishing, 2012) state (p138 et seq) that the animal was seen by Beckler at camp 53 in April 1861, in the vicinity of the Bulloo River system. Additionally, the authors state that the relief party of 1862, which included Howitt, collected a specimen south of Coopers Creek.
