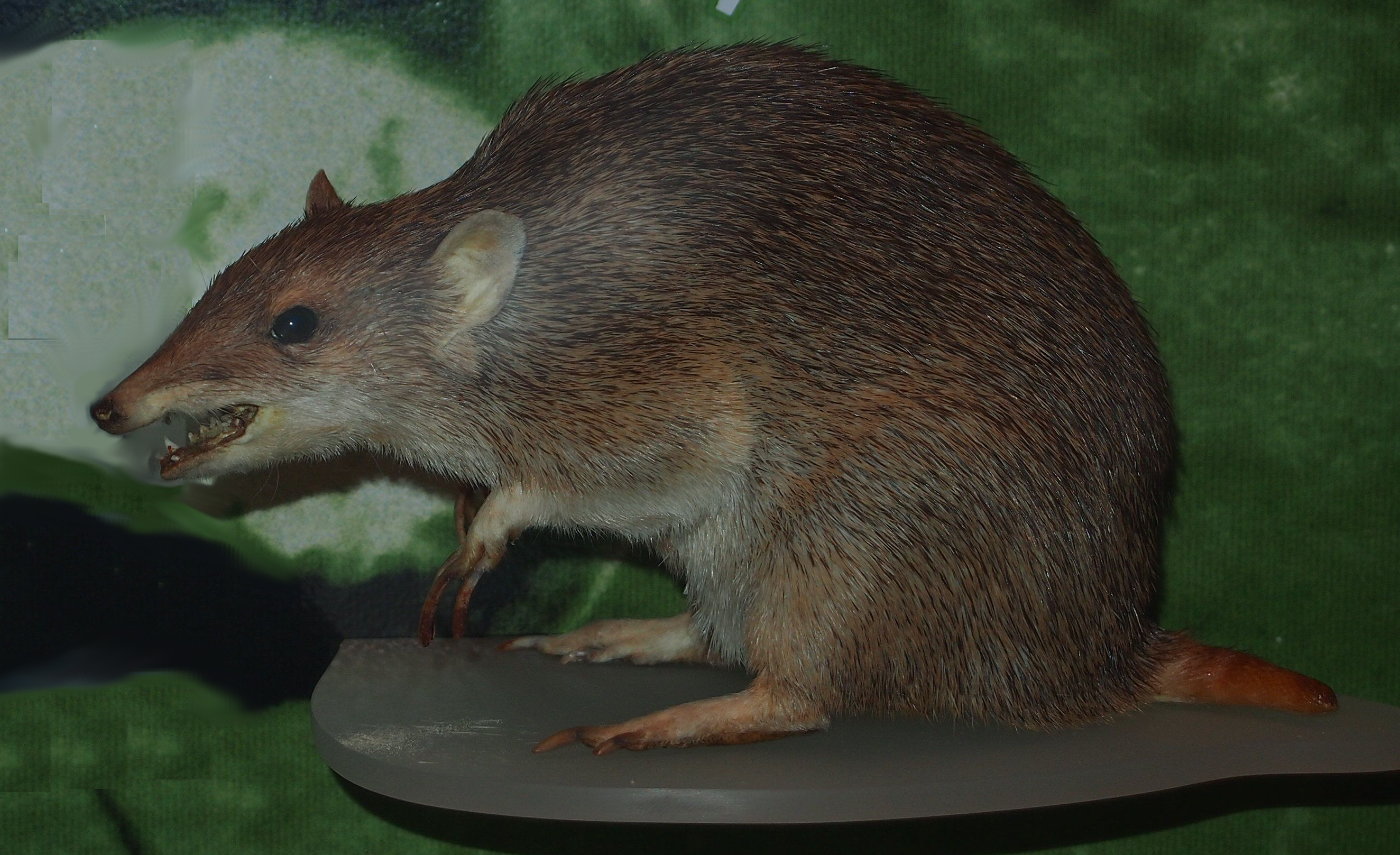

Conservation status
- Least Concern (IUCN 3.1)

Scientific classification
- Kingdom: Animalia
- Phylum: Chordata
- Class: Mammalia
- Infraclass: Marsupialia
- Order: Peramelemorphia
- Family: Peramelidae
- Genus: Isoodon
- Species: I. auratus

Binomial name
- Isoodon auratus (Ramsay, 1887)

Subspecies
- I. a. auratus (Note: See #Taxonomy); I. a. barrowensis
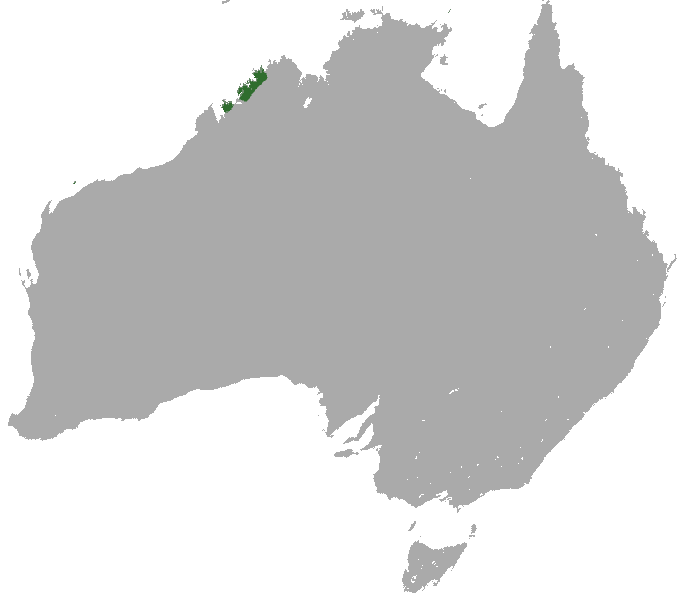
- Golden bandicoot range

= Golden bandicoot =

Species of marsupial

The golden bandicoot (Isoodon auratus; Yolngu: Wan'kurra) is a short-nosed bandicoot found in northern Australia. It is the smallest of its genus, and is distinguished from the brown bandicoots by its golden colouring and much smaller size.

It was once found throughout much of northern, central and western Australia, into south-western New South Wales, but it is now restricted to a few areas in Western Australia (WA) and the Northern Territory (NT). The I. auratus auratus subspecies, also known as the golden bandicoot (mainland), is found in the Kimberley region of WA, and on three of the Wessel Islands, NT: Marchinbar, Raragala, and Guluwuru Islands. Another subspecies, I. auratus barrowensis or golden bandicoot (Barrow Island), is found on Augustus, Barrow and Middle Islands off Western Australia (I. auratus barrowensis). As of 2026 the classification into subspecies is debated, and an October 2026 study suggests two new subspecies. The whole species is classed as vulnerable species under the EPBC Act in Australia, but as "Least Concern" by IUCN.

== Taxonomy ==
Earlier studies have suggested that the golden bandicoot (I. auratus) is closely related to the southern brown bandicoot (I. obesulus), and they may in fact be the same species. Zenger et al. (2005) posited that mitochondrial DNA evidence suggested that these two species ought to be grouped into one species with three distinct subspecies, I. obesulus obesulus, I. o. peninsulae, and I. o. fusciventer. I. auratus would be included in the I. o. fusciventer subspecies.

A third subspecies, I. a. arnhemensis has been recorded in Arnhem Land, NT, in the past, from the 1930s to 1980s, but this is now thought to be I. a. auratus.

I. obesulus and I. auratus appear to have been allopatric ever since the Pleistocene. As of 2026, the IUCN determines that I. auratus is a single species with no subspecies, while Isoodon peninsulae is a separate species.

A major study by Travouillon et al., "Genetic and morphological reassessment of the genus Isoodon (Marsupialia: Peramelemorphia) and description of new species and subspecies" was published in the Australian Journal of Taxonomy in October 2026. It was the culmination of 10 years of research on bandicoot bones held in museums using DNA analysis and detailed skull measurements, and made several significant new findings about bandicoots. The study aimed to reassess species and subspecies boundaries within the genus Isoodon. It found two new subspecies within I.auratus:

- Isoodon auratus bundilarri, around the Mitchell Falls camping ground, on the Mitchell Plateau, WA; previously part of I. a. auratus
- Isoodon auratus marchinbarensis, found only on Marchinbar Island, NT; previously part of I. a. arnhemensis

== Distribution ==
=== Range ===
The golden bandicoot was once found across most of northern, central and western Australia, as far as south-western New South Wales to the east. Some had also been sighted NSW/SA border, However, numbers declined sharply within a few decades after European settlement of Australia, and was gone from the central deserts by around 1950. By 1983 the only populations on the mainland remained in the Prince Regent National Park in the Kimberley region. It occurs in stable numbers on Barrow, Middle, and Augustus Islands, and by 1995 it was known to live in the Yampi Peninsula in northern Kimberley, as well as and Marchinbar Island in the Northern Territory.

The subspecies I. a. arnhemensis was recorded in Arnhem Land from the 1930s to 1980s, but this is now thought to be I. a. auratus. After the population was restricted to Marchinbar Island, groups were translocated and populations have been established on Raragala and Guluwuru Islands, also in the Wessel chain.

The largest golden bandicoot population lives on Barrow Island, because no cats or foxes have been introduced to the island, and other populations exist on Middle, Marchinbar, Augustus Islands. Small populations on mainland Australia are located in the Northern Territory and Western Australia. The golden bandicoot once lived all throughout Central Australia, but by 1992 it had been reduced to a small area in northwest Kimberly and Arnhem Land. In 2000, it was assumed that the species was extinct on the mainland.

It is also present in the Charnley River–Artesian Range Wildlife Sanctuary in the Kimberley.

=== Habitat ===
The golden bandicoot lives in spinifex and tussock grasslands, and it used to be widely distributed in arid deserts and the surrounding semi-arid areas as well as tropical forests and woodlands. In Northern Kimberley, it is found along the margins of rainforests lined with sandstone, and in the Yampi Peninsula it inhabits eucalypt woodlands. On Augustus and Marchinbar Islands it lives amongst sandstone in hummock grassland and heath or eucalypt woodlands, and on Barrow and Middle Islands it is found in grasslands and coastal shrub. Its range once included the Gibson, Great Sandy, Great Victoria, Little Sandy, and Tanami deserts. It is believed that the golden bandicoot disappeared from the deserts between the 1940s and 1960s.

=== Population numbers ===
Individuals have a home range between 12–35 ha (30–86 acres), and the largest golden bandicoot population is on Barrow Island with about 20,000 individuals. In fact, it is the most common mammal on the island. On Middle Island it is estimated that there are about 1,000 individuals, and on Marchinbar Island there are roughly 1,400 individuals. On mainland Australia, populations are sparse, and most population declines have occurred there.

== Physical characteristics ==
=== External anatomy ===
The golden bandicoot is the smallest of its genus, and is distinguished from the more common northern brown bandicoots (Isoodon macrourus) by its much smaller size, golden colour and shape of its hairs, and its flatter, more elongated head. It averages about 35 cm (14 in) in length from head to tail and weighs 260–655 g (9.2–23.1 oz) with an average of 310 g (11 oz). It is the smallest of the short-nosed bandicoots with a golden colour back, hence the name, finely streaked with black fur. The sides and face are a faded light rust colour, and the underbelly is pale amber. The feet are the same colour as the underbelly and have sharp claws. The species was first described in 1897 from a specimen collected near Derby, Western Australia. As with most bandicoots, the golden bandicoot has a rather long, flat, pointy nose. It is an omnivore, consuming succulents, insects, plant bulbs, and small reptiles. The golden bandicoot is nocturnal, foraging at night by digging small holes in the ground to find food.

The golden bandicoot is quite rat-like in appearance due to its small body, hunched-over posture, and relatively long tail. The hind limbs are large and muscular compared to the short forelimbs. Each forefoot has three toes with flat claws, used for digging holes when hunting for prey. And, unlike most marsupials, the golden bandicoot has fused toes on its hind feet, forming a comb they use for grooming. All bandicoots in the genus Isoodon have short noses and small, rounded ears, and thus can be distinguished from most other bandicoots, which have longer noses and larger ears. Female golden bandicoots have eight teats in the rear-opening pouch.

=== Physiology ===
Living in hot, semi-arid environments, the golden bandicoot is well adapted to keeping cool. Indeed, it is one of only two extant bandicoot species that are especially suited for arid environments, the other one being the bilby (Macrotis lagotis). Measurements in the laboratory show that the golden bandicoot has a low body temperature that is constantly changing; in this sense it is heterothermic. This allows the internal body temperature to fluctuate in response to extreme environmental temperatures without inhibiting and denaturing necessary proteins. Additionally, it has a low basal metabolic rate, low thermal conductance, and low rate of evaporative water loss. A low metabolic rate correlates to less heat being produced by the body, and a low thermal conductance does not allow the golden bandicoot to capture and store heat well. A highly efficient panting mechanism allows for a low rate of evaporative water loss when cooling the body, conserving precious water. This is an indispensable advantage in arid and dry environments.

== Behaviour ==
=== Foraging ===
The golden bandicoot is nocturnal. During the day, it sleeps in dense vegetation or a hollow tree, making nests out of sticks, leaves, and grass. At night, it actively forages by digging shallow conical pits in the ground to root up succulents (their primary source of water), invertebrates, and plant roots. Because of this, its vision and sense of smell are highly developed, allowing it to see in low light and detect prey items by smell when digging. The golden bandicoot will also burrow in the soil if the temperature rises in order to keep cool.

=== Reproduction ===
Breeding occurs throughout the year and peaks during the wet season (December–January) and the dry season (August). Amongst marsupials, the golden bandicoot is known to have one of the highest reproductive rates, and it has one of the shortest gestation periods for mammals, only about 12 days. There are about 2–3 young per litter, and they remain in the pouch of the mother for up to 8 weeks. After this, there is little to no parental care, which allows the golden bandicoot to be such a prolific breeder.

== Threats ==
=== Competition ===
Several factors have contributed to the decline of golden bandicoot numbers throughout the century including introduced species, exotic predators, and loss of habitat. On Middle and Barrow Islands, competition with the introduced black rat (Rattus rattus) reduced golden bandicoot numbers significantly in the 1990s, but the black rat was successfully eradicated from these islands in 1993. Since then golden bandicoot numbers have increased five-fold. Additional competition comes from various rabbit species.

=== Predation ===
Large birds are the primary, natural predator of the golden bandicoot, but many predatory species have been introduced within its range. The European red fox (Vulpes vulpes), feral cats, and feral dogs all prey upon the golden bandicoot. When feral cats were introduced to Hermite Island, the golden bandicoot quickly became extinct just before 1912. On Marchinbar Island, hair samples from the golden bandicoot have been recovered in scat samples from feral dogs, and Aboriginal people have been known to hunt them as well. Wild dogs were present on the Marchinbar until 2004 or 2005, when they were eradicated.

The greatest threat to the species has been, and remains, feral cats.

=== Habitat alteration ===
Changes in fire regions have been cited as another major factor in the decline of the golden bandicoot. Reduced groundcover due to fires makes the golden bandicoot more exposed to predation, but it has been reported that the golden bandicoot prefers areas that have been burnt relatively recently, as these have fresh new vegetation close to the ground.

== Conservation ==
=== Status ===
Previously listed as vulnerable most recently as 2016 on the IUCN Red List, as of 2026 the species is listed as least concern.

As of 2023 both subspecies are classed as vulnerable under the EPBC Act in Australia, since July 2000. The mainland subspecies is listed as extinct under the Biodiversity Conservation Act 2016 (NSW) and Flora and Fauna Guarantee Act 1988 (Vic.), and as vulnerable under the Biodiversity Conservation Act 2016 (WA), while I. a. barrowensis is only listed on the Biodiversity Conservation Act 2016 (WA) (as vulnerable).

=== Recovery plans 2003–2015 ===
A national recovery plan for the golden bandicoot and the golden-backed tree rat (Mesembriomys macrurus) was established in 2003 for a five-year period between 2004–2009 with the following management priorities:

1. Form management arrangements between agencies, land managers, and land owners
2. Form a multiple species recovery team to attack the issue of multiple species decline in northern Australia
3. Monitor population trends
4. Translocate golden bandicoots from Marchinbar Island to two other islands and follow up on said populations
5. Identify the key components that affect critical weight range of tropical savannah mammals
6. Develop educational materials to effectively communicate to stakeholders
7. Inform and involve the community in recovery process

This recovery plan, adopted for this species on 11 April 2005, ceased to be in effect from 1 October 2015, and there is no recovery plan deemed necessary as of 2023. Instead, there is an "approved Conservation Advice [which] is an effective, efficient, and responsive document to guide the implementation of priority management actions, mitigate key threats, and support the recovery of this EPBC Act listed Vulnerable species".

=== Translocation and other efforts ===
In the Northern Territory, both the government and the Gumurr Marthakal Rangers (Note: Gumurr Marthakal is a ward in the East Arnhem Region.) are involved in a collaborative program to ensure the survival of the species. By 2021, many of the expired recovery plan objectives had been implemented. Ongoing priorities in the NT include:

1. to better safeguard the existing populations, by keeping Marchinbar Island cat-free; encouragement of traditional Aboriginal burning practices; and continuing monitoring of the populations
2. to continue to manage translocated populations
3. to investigate whether any animals still live on the mainland of north-east Arnhem Land

In June 2023, the Darran.gu Wulagura women's Indigenous ranger team worked in collaboration with the Australian Wildlife Conservancy to survey the bandicoot population on Wilinggin country (in the Kimberley) for the first time ever. The survey, which was carried out in the survey in the Charnley River-Artesian Range Wildlife Sanctuary in northern WA, involved trapping, examining, and identifying 94 individual golden bandicoots over the six nights. The objective was to ensure that translocation of some of the animals would not negatively affect the existing population. In August 2023, the joint teams translocated 40 of the animals from the Charnley River-Artesian Range Sanctuary to the 9,450-hectare (23,400-acre) Newhaven Wildlife Sanctuary, which is located around 360 km (220 mi) north-west of Alice Springs. These would be joined by a further 60 bandicoots from Barrow Island the following week.

== In indigenous Australian culture ==
The animal, known as Wan'kurra in the Yolngu language, features prominently in song-cycles in the ceremonies of the Gumatj people of Arnhem Land. It is a common motif in the work of artist Nancy Gaymala Yunupingu, often running through scrubland.

It used to be referred to as "old people's food" by some Aboriginal people, because of their slow pace.
