= Cyclone Lam =

Category 4 Australian region tropical cyclone in 2015

Severe Tropical Cyclone Lam
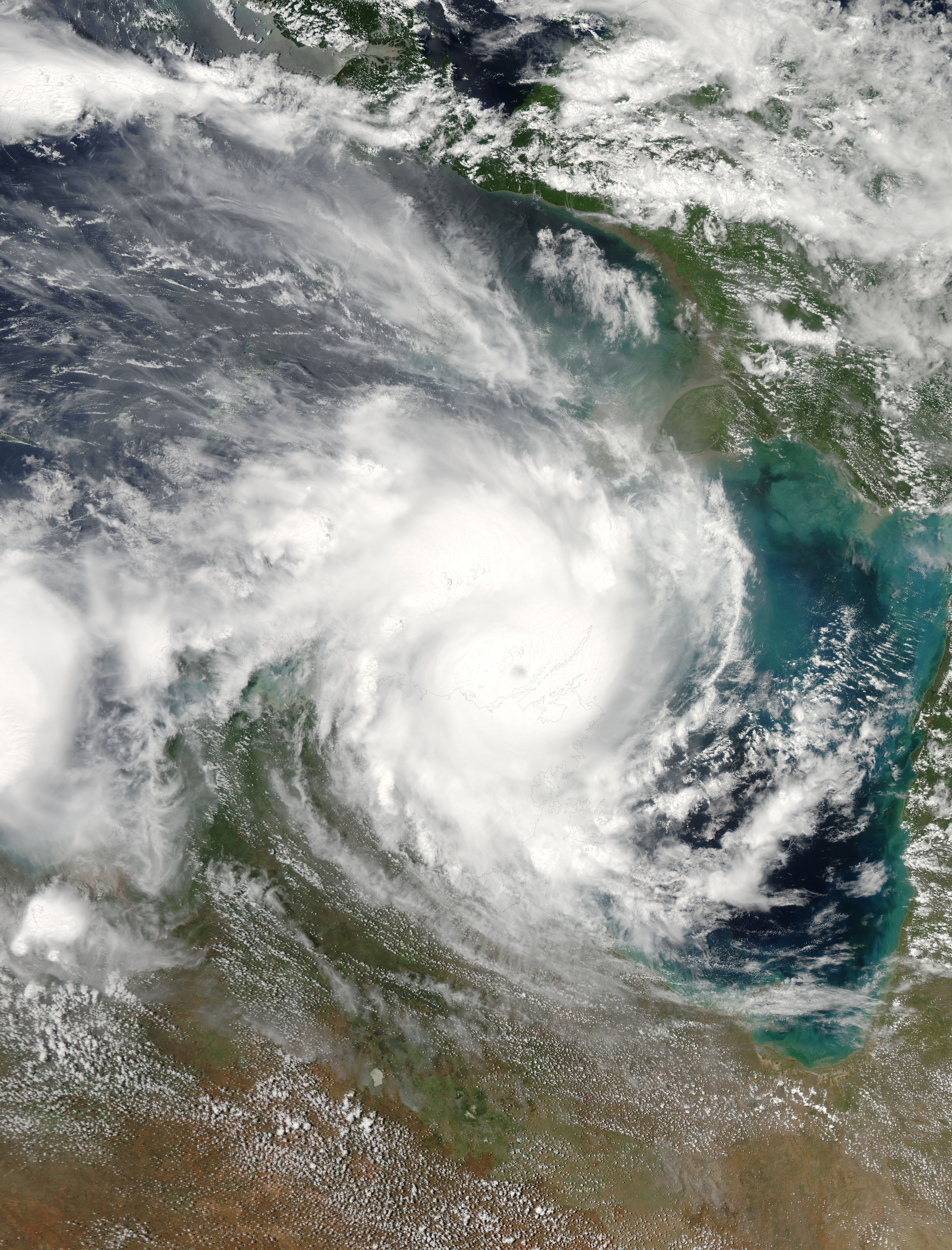
- Cyclone Lam at peak intensity on 19 February

Meteorological history
- Formed: 12 February 2015
- Remnant low: 20 February 2015
- Dissipated: 24 February 2015

Category 4 severe tropical cyclone
- 10-minute sustained (BOM)
- Highest winds: 185 km/h (115 mph)
- Highest gusts: 260 km/h (160 mph)
- Lowest pressure: 942 hPa (mbar); 27.82 inHg

Category 3-equivalent tropical cyclone
- 1-minute sustained (SSHWS/JTWC)
- Highest winds: 185 km/h (115 mph)
- Lowest pressure: 943 hPa (mbar); 27.85 inHg

Overall effects
- Fatalities: None reported
- Damage: $78.1 million (2015 USD)
- Areas affected: Queensland, Northern Territory, Western Australia
- IBTrACS /
- Part of the 2014–15 Australian region cyclone season

Severe Tropical Cyclone Lam was the strongest storm to strike Australia's Northern Territory since Cyclone Monica in 2006. It formed from the monsoon trough on 12 February 2015 in the Coral Sea. For much of its duration, the system moved westward due to a ridge to the south. The system crossed over the Cape York Peninsula and moved into the Gulf of Carpentaria, whereupon it gradually organized due to warm waters and favorable outflow. On 16 February, the Bureau of Meteorology (BoM) classified it as a Category 1 on the Australian tropical cyclone intensity scale and gave it the name Lam. The storm intensified further while drifting toward the Wessel Islands, developing an eye and strengthening to the equivalence of a minimal hurricane on 18 February. It strengthened to reach maximum sustained winds of 185 km/h (115 mph) early on 19 February before turning to the southwest, making it a Category 4 cyclone. That day, it made landfall on Northern Territory between Milingimbi and Elcho Island at peak intensity, and it rapidly weakened over land. About six hours after Lam moved ashore, Cyclone Marcia struck Queensland as a Category 5 cyclone, marking the first time on record that two storms of Category 4 intensity struck Australia on the same day.

In its formative stages, Lam produced heavy rainfall and flooding in Far North Queensland. Later, the cyclone's rainfall set daily precipitation records in Northern Territory. However, the winds caused the most damage, with gusts estimated as high as 230 km/h (145 mph). The highest gust was 170 km/h (110 mph) at Cape Wessel on Rimbija Island. Lam caused considerable destruction, particularly affecting local aboriginal communities. Total damage in the Northern Territory exceeded A$100 million (US$78.1 million).

== Meteorological history ==
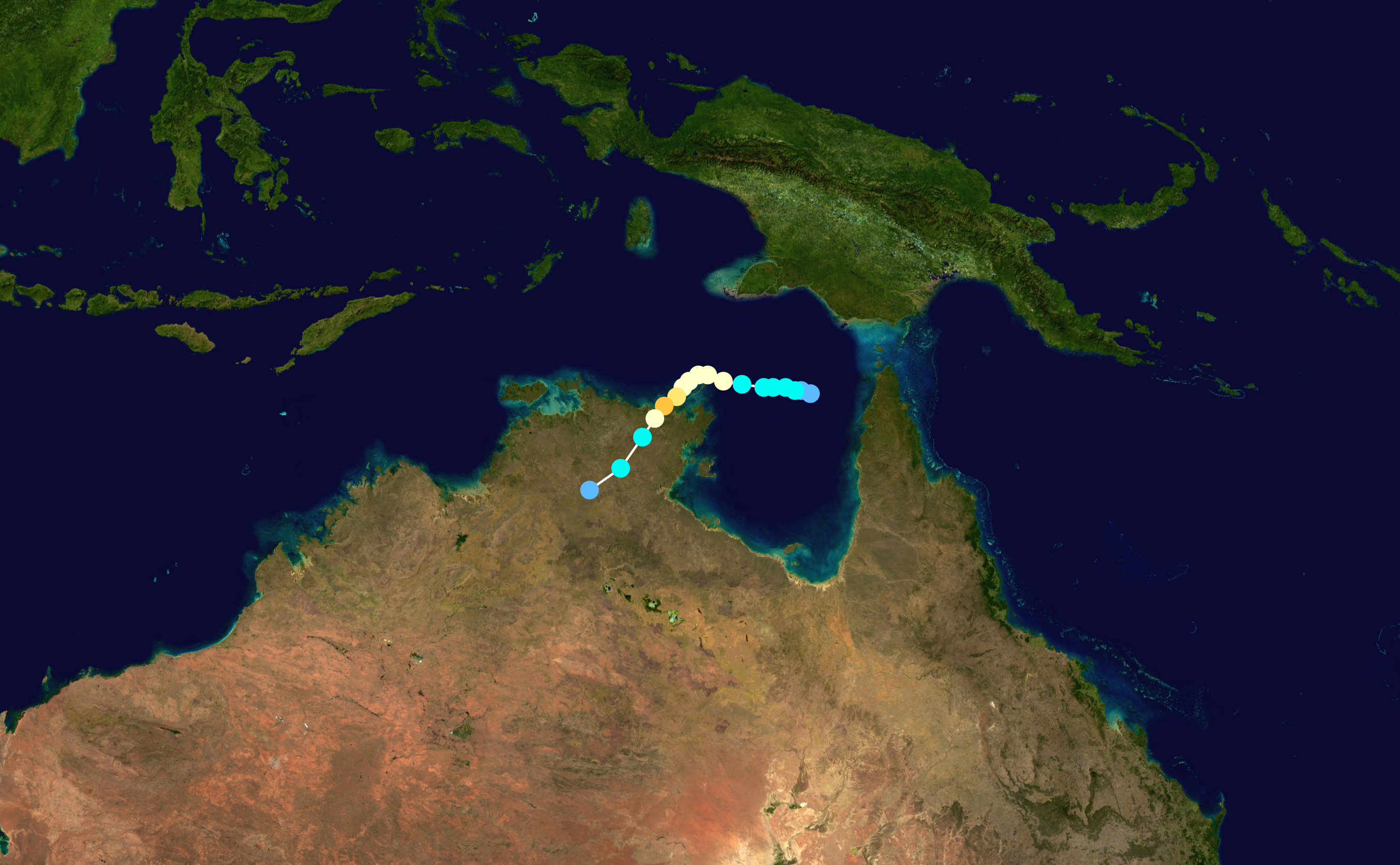
Map plotting the storm's track and intensity, according to the Saffir–Simpson scale Map key Saffir–Simpson scale Tropical depression (≤38 mph, ≤62 km/h) Tropical storm (39–73 mph, 63–118 km/h) Category 1 (74–95 mph, 119–153 km/h) Category 2 (96–110 mph, 154–177 km/h) Category 3 (111–129 mph, 178–208 km/h) Category 4 (130–156 mph, 209–251 km/h) Category 5 (≥157 mph, ≥252 km/h) Unknown Storm type Tropical cyclone Subtropical cyclone Extratropical cyclone, remnant low, tropical disturbance, or monsoon depression

On 12 February, the monsoon trough extended through the Coral Sea, developing a weak tropical low in the northern portion of the sea, according to the Australian Bureau of Meteorology (BoM). The system had a persistent area of convection, or thunderstorms, around a consolidating circulation. Conditions were moderately favorable for further development, including the presence of some wind shear and favorable outflow to the south. The system moved slowly westward into the Cape York Peninsula without much development, entering the Gulf of Carpentaria on 15 February, as it was steered by a ridge to the south. Thereafter, the convection consolidated and organized while the mid- and low-level circulations aligned. As a result, the BoM began classifying it as Tropical Low 13U at 06:00 UTC on 16 February while the system was about 235 km (145 mi) northwest of Weipa, Queensland. On the same day, the Joint Typhoon Warning Center (JTWC) issued a tropical cyclone formation alert, noting the decreasing wind shear and warm water temperatures of over 30 °C (86 °F).

Within six hours of its classification as Tropical Low 13U, the system developed a central dense overcast, which is an organized area of convection around the center. At 18:00 UTC on 16 February, the BoM upgraded the low to a Category 1 on the Australian tropical cyclone intensity scale, naming it Lam. At that time, the BoM anticipated the cyclone would intensify to peak 10 minute sustained winds of 185 km/h (115 mph) within 72 hours, which proved very accurate. Also at 18:00 UTC on 16 February, the JTWC began classifying the system as Tropical Cyclone 12P. Early on 17 February, an eye feature began forming within the convection. That day, Lam moved quicker to the west-northwest and slowed its rate of strengthening as it approached the Wessel Islands. Early on 18 February, the eye became better defined, moving over Cape Wessel. At 06:00 UTC that day, the BoM upgraded Lam to a Category 3 Severe Tropical Cyclone with 10 minute winds of 120 km/h (75 mph), equivalent to a minimal hurricane.

When Lam was passing near Cape Wessel, the lower and middle level circulations were slightly displaced, although the center was embedded within the deepest convection. The eyewall became smaller and more defined over time as the outflow strengthened, indicating that the cyclone was undergoing rapid deepening late on 18 February. Around the same time, Lam turned to the southwest as the ridge to the south weakened. At 12:00 UTC on 19 February, the BoM upgraded Lam to a Category 4 cyclone, estimating peak 10 minute winds of 185 km/h (115 mph); this was based on the well-defined eye and rainbands on satellite imagery. At the same time, the JTWC estimated the same intensity, only in 1 minute winds. At around 16:30 UTC (2:00 a.m. local time) on 19 February, Lam made landfall along Northern Territory between Milingimbi Island and Elcho Island at peak intensity. The eye quickly deteriorated as the cyclone moved through the Top End. The storm weakened rapidly over land, deteriorating into a tropical low about 12 hours after landfall. The JTWC continued tracking Lam until 22 February, when the weak circulation was located in the northeastern portion of Western Australia.

About six hours after Lam moved ashore, Cyclone Marcia made landfall along Queensland, making it the first time on record that two storms of at least Category 4 intensity struck Australia on the same day. Lam was the first severe tropical cyclone to strike Northern Territory since Cyclone Monica in April 2006. In addition, Lam's landfall on 19 February marked the third latest date for Australia to receive its first landfall, and the latest since 1988.

== Preparations and impact ==
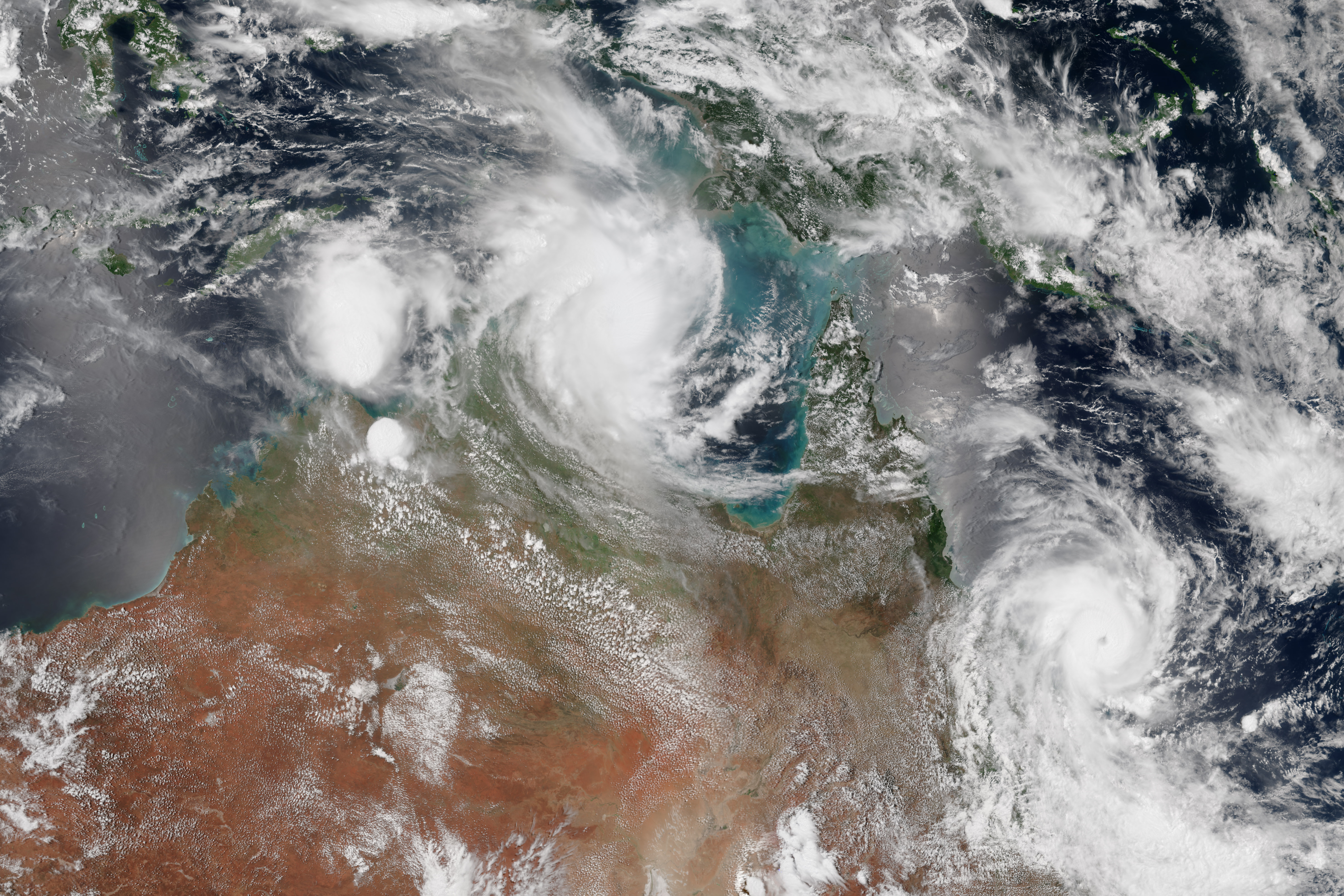
Satellite image of Lam (top-center) and Marcia (right) making near-simultaneous landfalls

When the BoM first classified Lam as Tropical Low 13U, the agency also issued a cyclone watch for the Cape York Peninsula and Arnhem Land. Before the storm struck, officials transported residents in Lam's path by air to the capital city Darwin. All 426 people living in Warruwi were airlifted, and the storm caused many schools in the region to be closed; students from Warruwi continued classes after they evacuated to Darwin. Residents anticipated Lam's intensity to be lower at landfall, which left some off guard.

Lam's precursor brought heavy rainfall and flooding to Far North Queensland. Upon striking Northern Territory, Cyclone Lam produced estimated wind gusts of 230 km/h (145 mph), which knocked down many trees and power lines. The highest observed wind gust was 170 km/h (110 mph) at Cape Wessel on Rimbija Island. The winds were strong enough to cause two anemometers to fail, with peak recordings of 150 km/h (93 mph) on Elcho Island and 93 km/h (58 mph) on Milingimbi Island. Offshore Northern Territory, Lam destroyed several houses along Elcho Island and left residents without water or electricity. In the town of Galiwinku on the island, two-thirds of the houses were affected, with 130 having roof damage, ten seriously damaged, and six destroyed. By a week after the storm, 250 residents were still displaced. However, water and power were restored to Galinwinku by 25 February. Damage on Elcho Island estimated to be A$80 million (US$62.5 million). Total damage in the Northern Territory exceeded A$100 million (US$78.1 million).

In Ramingining, the winds damaged a court house and police offices, and killed one dog. "Thousands" of people were homeless or displaced due to the storm, many residing in shelters. Farther inland, Lam dropped heavy rainfall that caused flooding, peaking at 258.5 mm (10.18 in) at Diljin Hill along the Waterhouse River. The rains set daily precipitation records at three Northern Territory locations. A girl required medical treatment after stepping on a downed power line. There were no deaths or other serious injuries due to the storm, and damage was less than expected despite the intensity; this was possibly due to the storm moving ashore at low tide.

Following the storm, the Northern Territory government declared a state of emergency for the hardest hit areas. It provided financial assistance to families affected by the storm, totaling $1,245 (AUD) for each family. The government sent a Royal Australian Air Force plane with emergency supplies to Darwin after a request from the Northern Territory. Officials sent crews to Elcho Island to help clear debris and restore power. Residents in Ramingining were under a boil-water advisory following the storm. A crew of 15 volunteers flew from Alice Springs and Maningrida to help emergency workers. An online crowdfunding group raised over $12,000 (AUD) within one day to provide emergency supplies. Emergency officials also advised residents not to drive around disaster areas for "sightseeing" due to the potential to disrupt repairs. A water and power worker estimated the power lines would be restored within one week, although that was dependent on internal building damage or tree removal. Following the storm, many residents returned to their damaged homes and lived instead in tents. The Northern Territory government established a tent city on the offshore Elcho Island, which was dismantled on 20 March due to the threat of approaching Cyclone Nathan.

=== Retirement ===
Due to its impact, the Australian Bureau of Meteorology retired the name Lam. It was later replaced with Laszlo in October 2016.

== See also ==
- Cyclone Kathy – a powerful cyclone in 1984 that intensified in the Gulf of Carpentaria and struck Northern Territory
