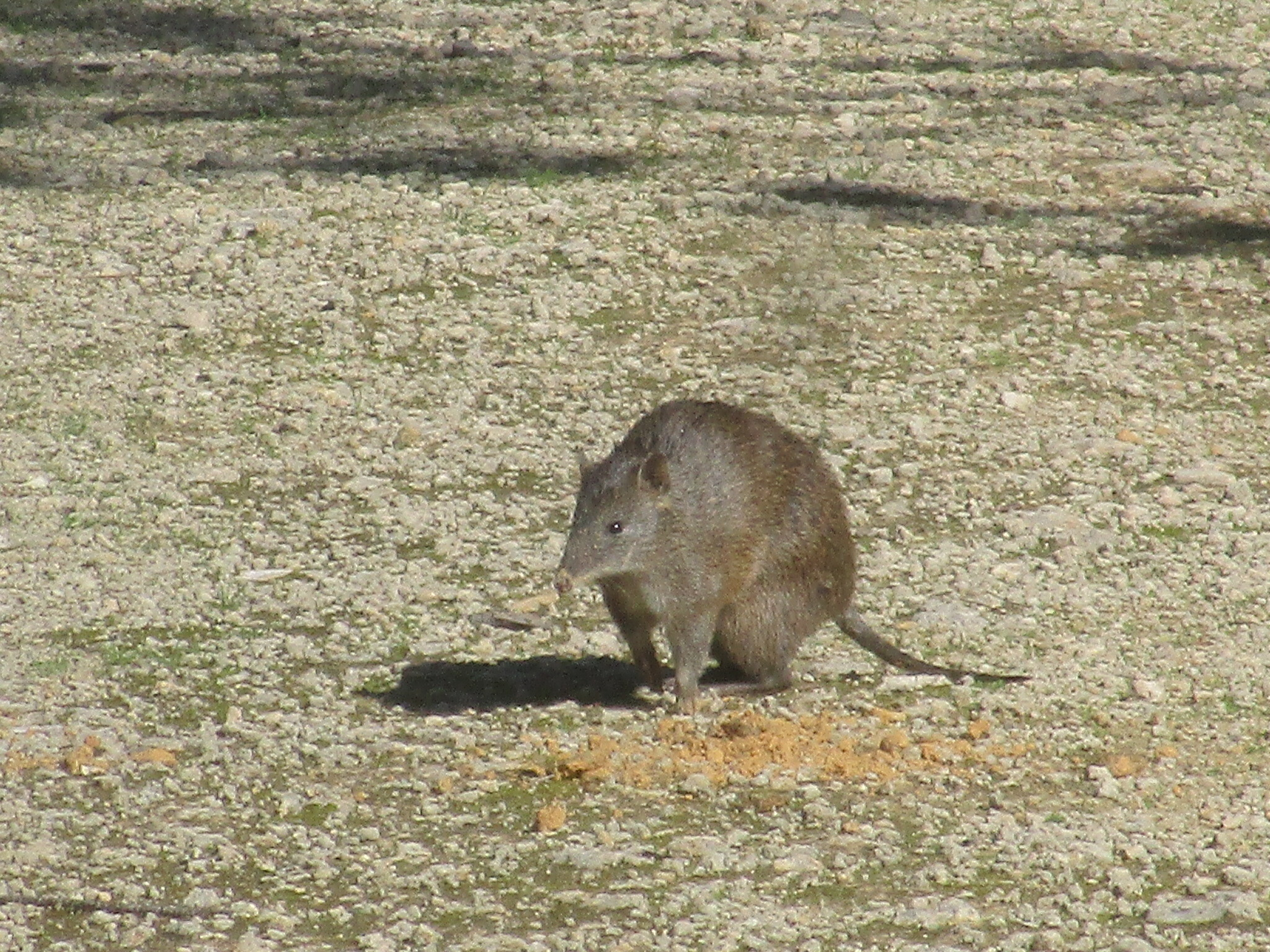
- Quenda digging for arthropods. Beeliar Regional Park, Bibra Lake.

Conservation status
- Least Concern (IUCN 3.1)

Scientific classification
- Kingdom: Animalia
- Phylum: Chordata
- Class: Mammalia
- Infraclass: Marsupialia
- Order: Peramelemorphia
- Family: Peramelidae
- Genus: Isoodon
- Species: I. fusciventer

Binomial name
- Isoodon fusciventer (J. E. Gray, 1841)

= Quenda =

Species of marsupial

The quenda (Isoodon fusciventer), also known as the southwestern brown bandicoot or western brown bandicoot, is a small marsupial species endemic to Southwest Australia in the state of Western Australia. An October 2026 study identified four new subspecies of quenda, making a total of five.

== Taxonomy and terminology ==
Though it was originally treated as a subspecies of the southern brown bandicoot (Isoodon obesulus), such as by the IUCN where it is given the status of least concern, a 2018 paper proposed to raise it to species rank due to molecular and morphological analysis which revealed it was more closely related to the golden bandicoot (Isoodon auratus).

It is recognised as a separate species by the American Society of Mammologists' Mammal Diversity Database, the Australian Faunal Directory and the Atlas of Living Australia.

Isoodon fusciventer is known by the common names quenda, southwestern brown bandicoot, or western brown bandicoot.

A major study by Travouillon et al., "Genetic and morphological reassessment of the genus Isoodon (Marsupialia: Peramelemorphia) and description of new species and subspecies" was published in the Australian Journal of Taxonomy in October 2026. It was the culmination of 10 years of research on bandicoot bones held in museums using DNA analysis and detailed skull measurements, and made several significant new findings about bandicoots. Among these, the study determined that the bandicoots presently living in the Mount Lofty Ranges (Adelaide Hills), Fleurieu Peninsula, and on Kangaroo Island in South Australia are related to quendas, but are now considered their own subspecies, named Isoodon fusciventer terrenus. The study was led by Western Australian Museum's terrestrial zoology curator Kenny Travouillon.

=== Subspecies ===
Isoodon fusciventer nauticus was identified by Oldfield Thomas in 1922.

The 2026 study by Travouillon et al. found four new subspecies:

- Isoodon fusciventer halae
- Isoodon fusciventer dawensis
- Isoodon fusciventer insulanus
- Isoodon fusciventer terrenus

== Description ==
Quenda in a Perth garden

Quenda are small marsupials with a long pointed muzzle; they are usually stockily built, with short limbs and neck. The head and body length is 40–50 cm (16–20 in), tail length 13 cm (5.1 in) and weight about 1.2–1.850 kg (2.65–4.08 lb). The teeth are small, relatively even-sized and pointed, as in typical insectivore teeth. The bandicoot body is basically designed for digging in soil to extract invertebrate food. The elongate muzzle and powerful foreclaws are used for probing in crevices and rooting and digging in soil.

== Biology and behaviour ==
Quenda in the Perth Hills, WA

This species is a solitary nocturnal feeder, but can be often observed active at times during the day depending on the proximity of predators. Quenda are omnivorous and as such they consume a range of organisms such as arthropods, plant roots, tubers and fungi. Sourcing these items comes from foraging across the ground surface or by penetrating the top soil through digging. The unique conical diggings that are a result of foraging by the quenda, have proven to have a positive effect on an ecosystem by aerating the soil and allowing nutrients to cycle more efficiently.

The males are territorial and aggressive to other quenda and will fight each other. This often results in ears being torn and tails lost.

Quenda breed throughout the year with a peak in spring. The backward opening pouch contains eight teats arranged in an incomplete circle, and accommodates one to six (usually two to four) young in a litter. Two or three litters may be reared in a year, though this is dependent upon food availability. It has been found that older females produce more litters. In eastern Australia, gestation period is short (12–15 days). The young are weaned when about 60–70 days old.

== Habitat and distribution ==
Scrubby, often swampy, vegetation with dense cover up to 1 m (3 ft 3 in) high, often feeds in adjacent forest and woodland that is burnt on a regular basis and in areas of pasture and cropland lying close to dense cover. Populations inhabiting Jarrah and Wandoo forests are usually associated with watercourses. Quenda will thrive in more open habitat subject to introduced predator control. On the Swan Coastal Plain, quenda are often associated with wetlands.

It had previously been thought that the quenda was endemic only to parts of Western Australia; Quenda are one of the few native marsupials that can still be seen in Perth's urban bushland reserves. Travouillon et al. (2026) showed that the quenda also once lived around Adelaide, Kangaroo Island, and the Nuyts Archipelago in South Australia, but no longer do so. The bandicoots found in the Adelaide Hills, Fleurieu Peninsula, and Kangaroo Island today are a subspecies of quenda called Isoodon fusciventer terrenus.

== Conservation status ==
According to the WA Department of Biodiversity, Conservation and Attractions, this species' conservation status is "Priority 4: Rare, Near Threatened and other species in need of monitoring". They are vulnerable to predation by feral foxes and cats, but quenda populations can recover where predators are controlled.
