= HMAS Patricia Cam =

Australian minesweeper

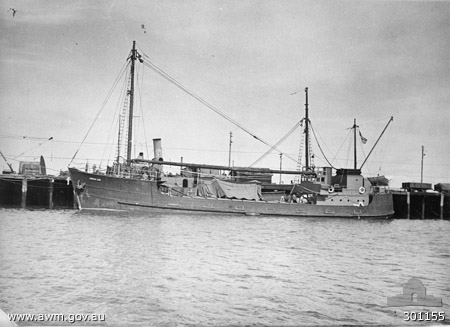
- Patricia Cam prior to entering military service

History

Australia
- Owner: Cam & Sons Pty Ltd
- Builder: G. Beattie, Brisbane Waters, New South Wales
- Fate: Requisitioned by RAN

History

Australia
- Acquired: 9 February 1942
- Commissioned: 3 March 1942
- Honours and awards: Battle honours: Darwin 1942–43
- Fate: Sunk, 22 January 1943

General characteristics in RAN service
- Type: Fishing vessel
- Displacement: 301 tons
- Length: 120 ft 9 in (36.80 m)
- Beam: 30 ft 3 in (9.22 m)
- Draught: 6 ft 4 in (1.93 m)
- Propulsion: diesel engines, 160 HP
- Speed: 8 knots (15 km/h; 9.2 mph)
- Complement: 2 officers, 17 ratings
- Armament: 1 × 20 mm Oerlikon; 2 × .303 Vickers machine guns; 1 × Browning machine gun

HMAS Patricia Cam was an auxiliary vessel operated by the Royal Australian Navy during World War II. She was sunk by a Japanese aircraft in 1943.

== Construction ==
The ship was built in 1940 at Brisbane Waters, New South Wales as a tuna-fishing trawler for the Sydney fishing company Cam & Sons Pty Ltd.

== Operational history ==
Following the outbreak of war in the Pacific, the ship was requisitioned by the Royal Australian Navy for use as an auxiliary minesweeper on 9 February 1942. She was commissioned into the RAN on 3 March 1942 as HMAS Patricia Cam, with a complement of 2 officers and 17 sailors.

Based in Darwin, Patricia Cam was mainly used to transport supplies to small communities, military outposts, and Coastwatchers.

== Loss ==
In January 1943, the vessel sailed through the islands off Arnhem Land. At one stop, they picked up six passengers: five Yolngu men including Narritjin Maymuru, and Reverend Leonard Kentish, chief of the Methodist mission stations in the Northern Territory. Patricia Cam then sailed for the Wessel Islands, with one of the Yolngu men serving as pilot.

On 22 January, while en route, a Japanese floatplane located Patricia Cam and attacked; the unaware vessel had no radar. The first bomb landed in Patricia Cam's hold and exploded, killing one sailor. The damage caused the ship to sink within a minute. A second bomb from the floatplane killed another sailor and two of the passengers. The floatplane made several strafing runs, then landed near the survivors. After failing to encourage the survivors to surrender, one of the crew captured Kentish at gunpoint (the only Australian prisoner-of-war captured inside Australian territory) and left. Kentish was flown to Dobo in the Aru Islands where he was interrogated, including the frequent use of beatings, for several weeks, before being executed by his captors on or about 4 May. In 1948, his executioner Sub Lieutenant Sagejima Mangan was tried and hanged for the crime.

All but two of the remaining survivors were on a liferaft. The others were clinging to debris, and drifted away; the remains of one were found nine years later in a cave on Valencia Island, 320 kilometres (200 mi) from the point of sinking. The life raft drifted for 15 hours before coming to an islet off Guluwuru. The survivors swam ashore and fell asleep on the beach, waking to find that one of the crew had died from his wounds during the night. One of the Yolngu died the next day, with both bodies buried on the beach. While fresh water was available, there was very little food, with the Yolngu survivors using their local knowledge to provide shellfish and edible roots. Fires lit by the survivors were spotted by Yolngu people of the Wessel Islands, who came across in canoes to render assistance. Two groups left to find help, one group of Yolngu paddling south, the other leading Patricia's captain to the Marchinbar Island radar station. Supplies were dropped to the survivors by an RAAF reconnaissance plane, and they were rescued on 29 January by HMAS Kuru.

The vessel's military service was later recognised with the battle honour "Darwin 1942–43".

A memorial to Patricia Cam and the people killed as a result of its sinking is located at Yirrkala. It was completed in 2017. In 2026 a plaque commemorating the ship was installed at the HMAS Coonawarra navy base in Darwin.
