= Warnawi Island =

Island in Northern Territory, Australia

Coordinates: 11.7968°S 136.0399°E

Warnawi Island is a small island which is part of both the Wessel Islands group and the Cunningham Islands in the Northern Territory of Australia. It is one of two islands to do the other being Bumaga Island.
