= Cyclone Marcia =

Category 5 Australian region cyclone in 2015

Severe Tropical Cyclone Marcia
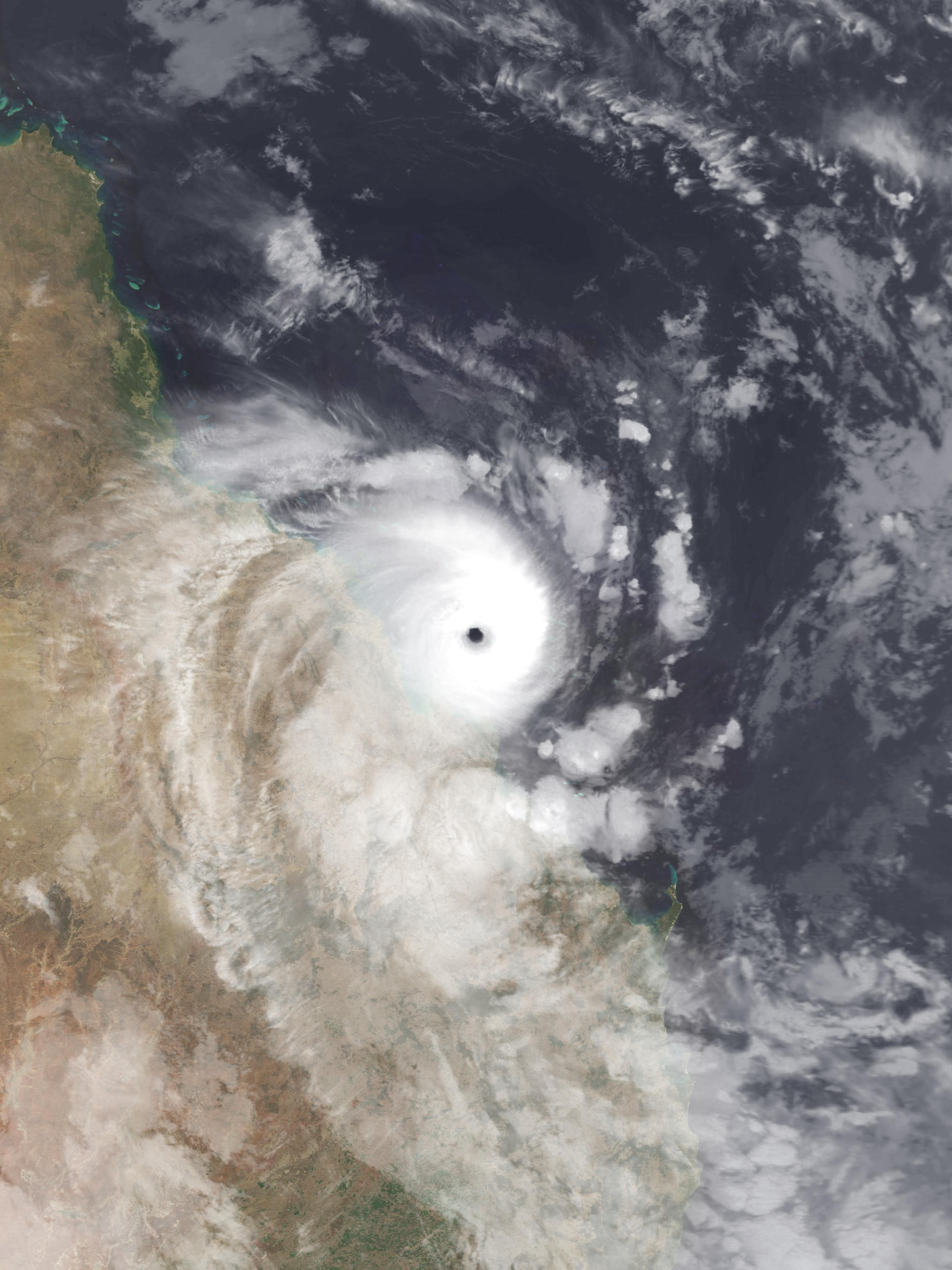
- Cyclone Marcia prior to peak intensity on 19 February

Meteorological history
- Formed: 15 February 2015
- Remnant low: 26 February 2015
- Dissipated: 1 March 2015

Category 5 severe tropical cyclone
- 10-minute sustained (BOM)
- Highest winds: 205 km/h (125 mph)
- Highest gusts: 285 km/h (180 mph)
- Lowest pressure: 932 hPa (mbar); 27.52 inHg

Category 4-equivalent tropical cyclone
- 1-minute sustained (SSHWS/JTWC)
- Highest winds: 230 km/h (145 mph)
- Lowest pressure: 929 hPa (mbar); 27.43 inHg

Overall effects
- Fatalities: None
- Damage: $587 million (2015 USD)
- Areas affected: Queensland
- IBTrACS /
- Part of the 2014–15 Australian region cyclone season

Severe Tropical Cyclone Marcia was a powerful tropical cyclone that made landfall at its peak strength over central Queensland, near Shoalwater Bay on 20 February 2015. The cyclone went on to affect various areas including Yeppoon and Rockhampton. It passed just to the west of Yeppoon as a Category 5 system, then traversed over the regional city of Rockhampton as a Category 3 system on the same day. Eventually, the cyclone weakened, moved southeast out to sea, before dissipating. Marcia caused at least A$750 million (US$587 million) worth of damage.

== Meteorological history ==
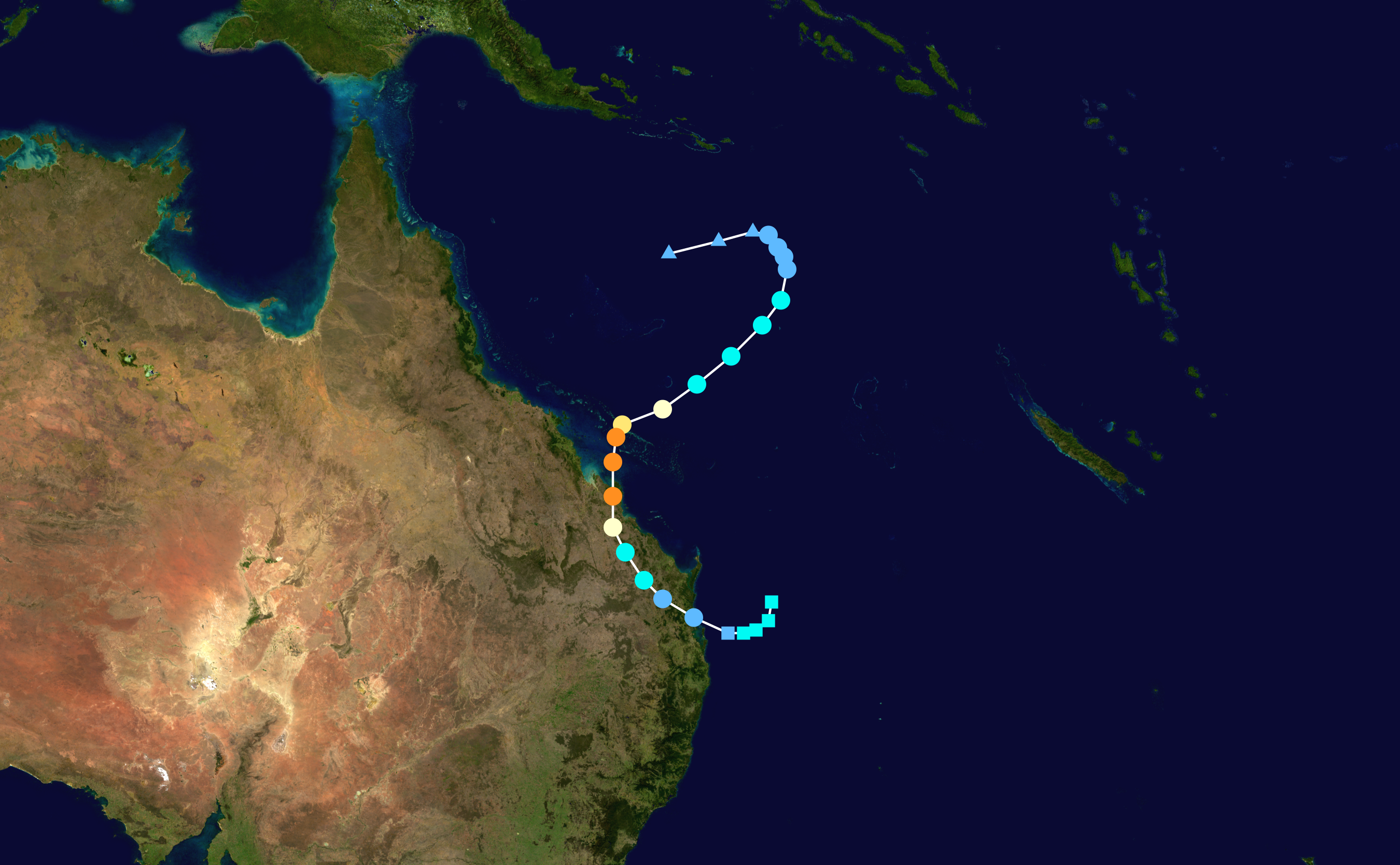
Map plotting the storm's track and intensity, according to the Saffir–Simpson scale Map key Saffir–Simpson scale Tropical depression (≤38 mph, ≤62 km/h) Tropical storm (39–73 mph, 63–118 km/h) Category 1 (74–95 mph, 119–153 km/h) Category 2 (96–110 mph, 154–177 km/h) Category 3 (111–129 mph, 178–208 km/h) Category 4 (130–156 mph, 209–251 km/h) Category 5 (≥157 mph, ≥252 km/h) Unknown Storm type Tropical cyclone Subtropical cyclone Extratropical cyclone, remnant low, tropical disturbance, or monsoon depression

The Australian Bureau of Meteorology (BoM) started to monitor a tropical low which developed within the monsoon trough to the southeast of Papua New Guinea on 15 February. The system drifted generally eastwards and developed slowly under moderate vertical wind shear, until the Joint Typhoon Warning Center (JTWC) issued a Tropical Cyclone Formation Alert early on 17 February when deep convection wrapping tightly into a well-defined centre. Late on the same day, the BoM began to issue technical bulletins and designated the tropical low as 14U, although the bureau initially forecasted that it would only intensify into a category 1 cyclone prior to landfall. The JTWC upgraded the partially exposed system to a tropical cyclone and designated it as 13P early on 18 February, which also forecasted that it would intensify slightly. At 09Z, the BoM reported that the tropical low intensified into a category 1 tropical cyclone and named it Marcia, as it had started to track southwestwards along the northwestern periphery of a low- to mid-layered subtropical ridge.

When Marcia intensified into a category 2 tropical cyclone at 00:00 UTC on 19 February, it had developed a central dense overcast with a consolidating eyewall because of weakening vertical wind shear. Thanks to very good poleward outflow into the westerlies, Marcia dramatically underwent rapid intensification and formed a clear eye, becoming a category 3 severe tropical cyclone at 05:00 UTC and a category 4 system at 08:00 UTC. Soon afterwards, it turned southwards along the western periphery of a subtropical ridge and reached peak intensity at 18:00 UTC as a category 5 severe tropical cyclone with 10-minute maximum sustained winds at 205 km/h (125 mph), featuring a very well-defined 35 km (20 miles) eye. Maintaining strength, Marcia made landfall over the coast near Shoalwater Bay at 22:00 UTC (08:00 AEST on 20 February).

On 20 February, despite good poleward outflow, Marcia began to track southeastwards along the western periphery of the subtropical ridge and rapidly weakened due to land interaction and increasing vertical wind shear, yet the JTWC issued the final warning during sunset. The system weakened into a category 3 cyclone at 13:00 AEST (03:00 UTC), lost the severe tropical cyclone intensity at 17:00 AEST (07:00 UTC) and even weakened into a category 1 cyclone at 20:00 AEST (10:00 UTC). The BoM's final technical bulletin of Marcia indicated that the cyclone had eventually weakened into a tropical low at 15:00 UTC (01:00 AEST on 21 February), with the asymmetric wind structure and unimpressive observations.

The ex-tropical cyclone arrived in the Coral Sea from the southeast coast of Queensland on 21 February. The JTWC monitored Marcia again on 22 February and claimed that the system had become subtropical with gale-force sustained winds, when sea surface temperature (SST) was approximately 25 °C; moreover, satellite imageries also revealed a broad, exposed low-level circulation centre (LLCC) with deep convection displaced over the southeast periphery of the LLCC. Although it drifted northwards over warmer SST later, it was failed to intensify but weakened further. On 27 February, Marcia entered the responsible area of the Fiji Meteorological Service as a weak low-pressure system. The remnants were completely absorbed into a trough on 1 March.

== Preparations ==
=== Queensland ===
Prior to the category 5 storm making landfall the Premier of Queensland, Annastacia Palaszczuk, stated that South East Queensland should not expect a repeat of January 2011. Additionally, Flood rescue specialists and the Queensland State Emergency Service (SES) teams assisted with storm preparations and were placed on standby. Local Councils offered sandbags to residents who were likely to be affected by flooding. After landfall, the Queensland Disaster Recovery Committee convened. More than 800 people bunkered down in the Yeppoon Cyclone Shelter, the most southerly located cyclone shelter in Queensland, located within the grounds of the Yeppoon State High School. Nearby towns and hamlets took their own precautions to protect themselves. The heaviest rainfall was recorded over the Don and Dee Rivers and Callide Creek in the Fitzroy River area where up to 300 millimetres of rainfall was recorded in a 6–8-hour period during the afternoon and evening of 20 February.

== Impact and aftermath ==
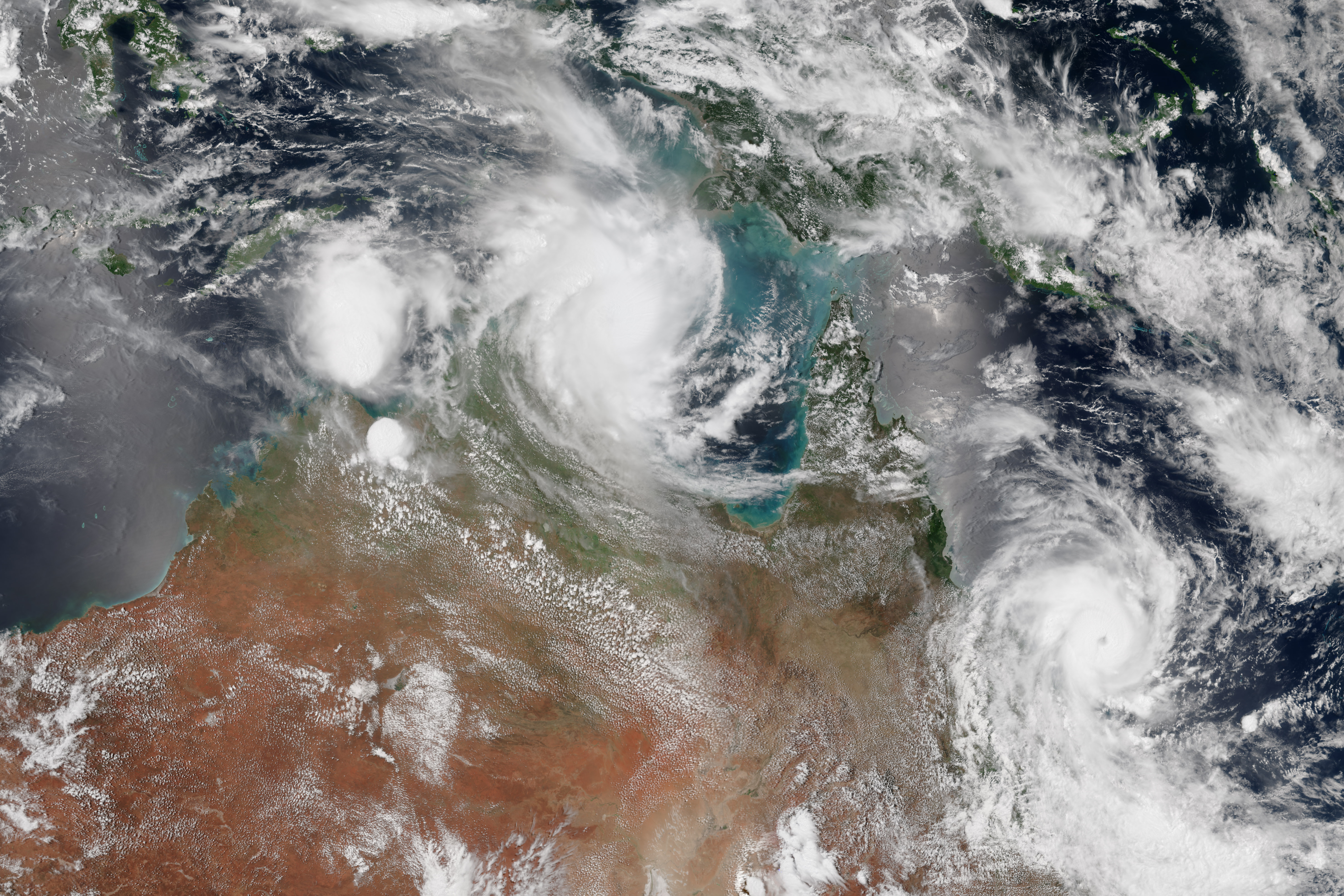
Satellite image of Lam (top-center) and Marcia (right) making near-simultaneous landfalls

The Global Disaster Alert and Coordination System issued an advisory at 06:00 UTC on 20 February stating that up to 92,000 people had been affected by Category 1 winds or higher.

Over 60 000 homes were left without power in Yeppoon, Rockhampton and Bundaberg as the storm moved south. Almost 3000 people requested assistance from the SES – including 800 in central Queensland. Significant structural damage occurred in the Yeppoon area and along the Capricorn Coast, with a number of houses having roofs blown off and walls torn down. Months later, houses are still permanently damaged. Structural damage also occurred across Rockhampton and in the townships of Marmor and Mount Larcom. Heavy rain fell across several regions and authorities evacuated residents from the small town of Jambin, south-west of Rockhampton, as localised flooding took place, which also affected Biloela. Total damage in Queensland reached A$750 million (US$587 million).

The observed windspeeds were lower than the analyzed maximum sustained winds, which had been estimated using the Advanced Dvorak Technique. The Bureau was criticised for continuing to report the ADT estimates after lower actual windspeeds had been recorded, by biologist and blogger Jennifer Marohasy of Central Queensland University. The International Wind Hazard Damage Assessment Group also expressed concern, saying "A community that receives an over-represented wind speed report may have potential for complacency in preparation or building standards in the future." BOM rejected the criticism, stating that Middle Percy Island was not located in the region of highest windspeed. The equipment there had also been destroyed by the storm, cutting off the data flow. Bureau chief Robb Webb also rejected claims BOM had relied solely on modelling, noting that the bureau worked with the US Joint Typhoon Warning Center to predict the storm's strength. The cyclone is still officially classified by the bureau as a Category 5.

=== Retirement ===
Due to its impact, the Australian Bureau of Meteorology retired the name Marcia. It was later replaced with Mingzhu in October 2016.

== See also ==
- Cyclone Larry
- Cyclone Hamish
- Cyclone Yasi
- Cyclone Oswald
- Cyclone Ita
- Cyclone Debbie
