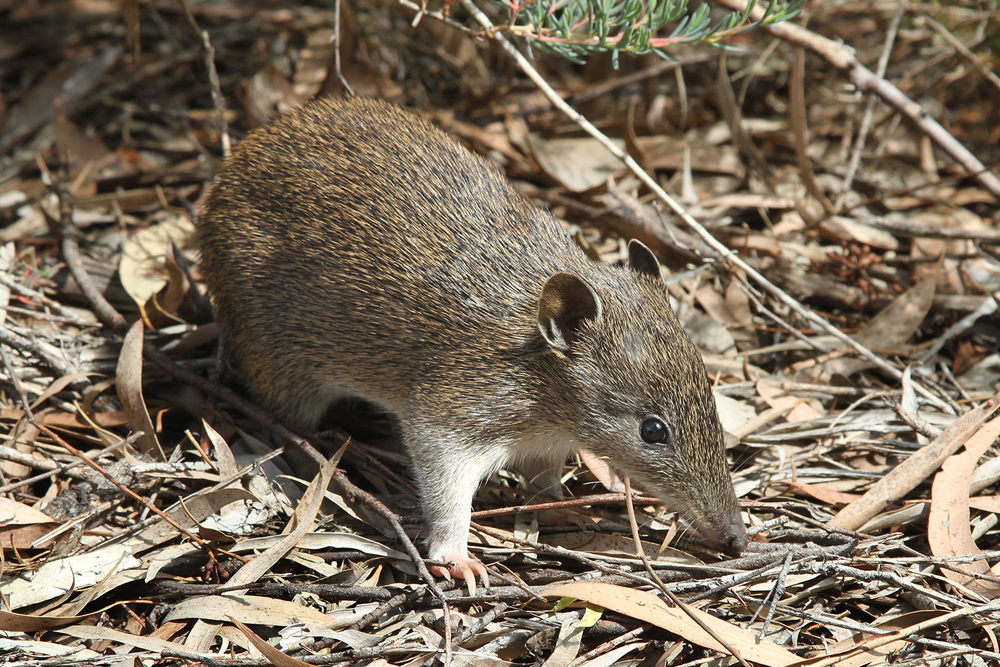
- Southern brown bandicoot Isoodon obesulus

Scientific classification
- Kingdom: Animalia
- Phylum: Chordata
- Class: Mammalia
- Infraclass: Marsupialia
- Order: Peramelemorphia
- Family: Peramelidae
- Subfamily: Peramelinae
- Genus: Isoodon (Desmarest, 1817)

Type species
- Didelphis obesula Shaw, 1797

Species & subspecies
- Isoodon auratus; Isoodon fusciventer; Isoodon macrourus; Isoodon obesulus; Isoodon peninsulae

= Short-nosed bandicoot =

Short-nosed bandicoots

Genus of marsupials

The short-nosed bandicoots (genus Isoodon) are members of the order Peramelemorphia. These marsupials can be found across Australia, although their distribution can be patchy.

== Origin ==
Genetic evidence suggests that short-nosed bandicoots diverged from the related long-nosed species around eight million years ago, during the Miocene epoch, and underwent a rapid diversification around three million years ago, during the late Pliocene.

== Species and subspecies ==
While the IUCN lists only three species in the genus (as of 2026), Australian sources (until 2026) consider there to be five species of the genus, with two subspecies of I. obesulus being elevated to full species status. In 2026 a sixth subspecies, now extinct, was identified.

- Golden bandicoot, Isoodon auratus
- Quenda or Western brown bandicoot, Isoodon fusciventer
- Northern brown bandicoot, Isoodon macrourus
- Southern brown bandicoot, Isoodon obesulus
- Cape York brown bandicoot, Isoodon peninsulae
- Little brown bandicoot, Isoodon microtis (extinct; identified 2026)

=== 2026 re-evaluation ===
A major study by Travouillon et al., "Genetic and morphological reassessment of the genus Isoodon (Marsupialia: Peramelemorphia) and description of new species and subspecies" was published in the Australian Journal of Taxonomy in October 2026. It was the culmination of 10 years of research on bandicoot bones held in museums using DNA analysis and detailed skull measurements, and made several significant new findings about bandicoots. The study aimed to reassess species and subspecies boundaries within the genus Isoodon.

In all, it described two new subspecies of golden bandicoot, four of the quenda, and one of the northern brown bandicoot. Among other findings, the study determined that the bandicoots presently living in the Mount Lofty Ranges (Adelaide Hills), Fleurieu Peninsula, and on Kangaroo Island in South Australia are related to quendas, but are now considered their own subspecies, named Isoodon fusciventer terrenus. It has previously been thought that all bandicoots in South Australia were southern browns. Previous classifications suggested that only one species, the southern brown bandicoot, occurred in SA. The study also identified an extinct species, Isoodon microtis, or little brown bandicoot, had been present in South Australia.
