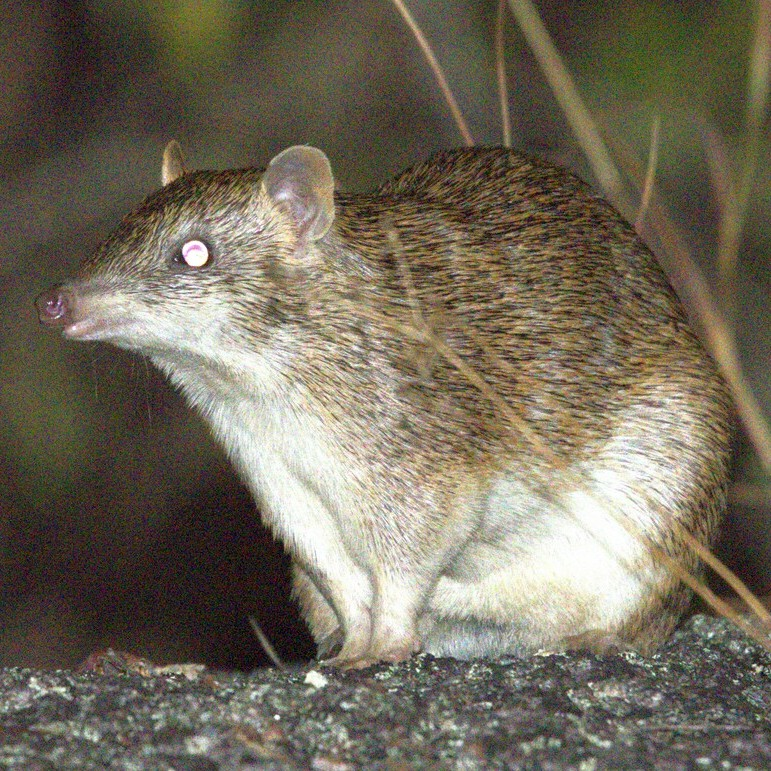

Conservation status
- Least Concern (NCA)

Scientific classification
- Kingdom: Animalia
- Phylum: Chordata
- Class: Mammalia
- Infraclass: Marsupialia
- Order: Peramelemorphia
- Family: Peramelidae
- Genus: Isoodon
- Species: I. peninsulae

Binomial name
- Isoodon peninsulae Thomas, 1922

= Cape York brown bandicoot =

Species of marsupial

The Cape York brown bandicoot (Isoodon peninsulae), is a species of bandicoot which is endemic to the Cape York Peninsula of North Queensland. It was previously considered a subspecies of the Southern brown bandicoot.

== Conservation ==
Under the Nature Conservation Act 1992 it is regarded as Least Concern.
