= Abbott Island (Wessel Islands) =

Island in Northern Territory, Australia

Coordinates: 12.020556°S 135.505556°E

Abbott Island, also known as Abbott Islet, is an island of the Wessel Islands in the Northern Territory of Australia.

The traditional owners of Abbott Island are the Yolngu people wo know this place as Dalmana.

== European history ==
This island was first viewed by Europeans in July 1819 and was named 'Rocky Island'. This name was later changed in the early 1930s by Captain CGT Haultain, who served on the patrol vessel Larrakeyah (also recorded as Larrakia) and he renamed it for Aubrey Abbott; the then Administrator of the Northern Territory.
