= Drysdale Island =

Island in Northern Territory, Australia

Coordinates: 11°41′S 136°00′E

Drysdale Island is a large but low-lying island in the Wessel Islands group in the Northern Territory of Australia. It is 12.4 kilometres (7.7 mi) long and up to 6.4 kilometres (4.0 mi) wide. It measures 49.5 square kilometres (19.1 sq mi) in area.

The only settlement is Yirringa, a small family Aboriginal outstation at the northeastern end.

There are numerous small lakes within it which are easily accessed by the tide, some of which are submerged for prolonged periods of time.

The much smaller and uninhabited Yargara Island (little more than one square kilometre in area) lies directly north and is separated from it by a shallow, rocky channel 400 metres (1,300 ft) wide. Its nearest neighbour to the south-west is Graham Island, separated by a 1,600-metre (5,200 ft) wide marine channel. The easternmost point of the island is called Dale Point.

Nahimutangan sa Drysdale Island sa Ostralya.
