= Cunningham Islands =

Island group in Northern Territory, Australia

Coordinates: 11°44′S 136°06′E

The Cunningham Islands is a small group of islands located south of the Wessel Islands in the Northern Territory of Australia. Both Bumaga Island and Warnawi Island are in the Cunningham Islands group and the Wessel Islands group.
