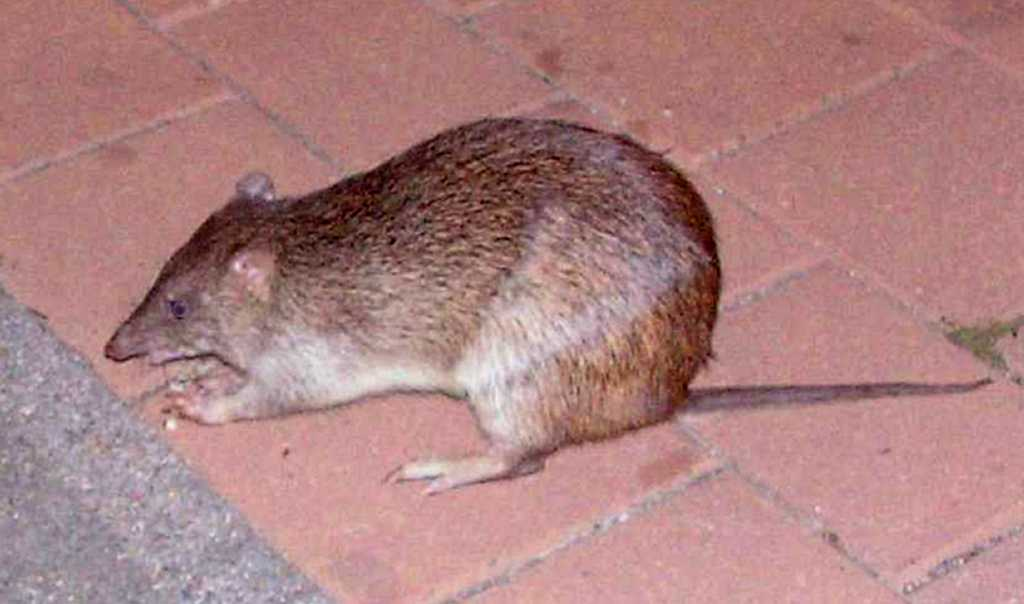
- Queensland, Australia

Conservation status
- Least Concern (IUCN 3.1)

Scientific classification
- Kingdom: Animalia
- Phylum: Chordata
- Class: Mammalia
- Infraclass: Marsupialia
- Order: Peramelemorphia
- Family: Peramelidae
- Genus: Isoodon
- Species: I. macrourus

Binomial name
- Isoodon macrourus (Gould, 1842)
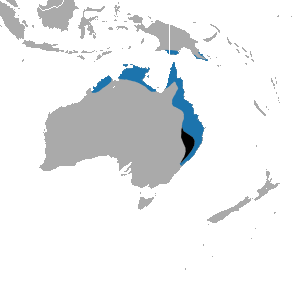
- Northern brown bandicoot range (blue — extant, black — extinct)

= Northern brown bandicoot =

Species of marsupial

The northern brown bandicoot (Isoodon macrourus), a marsupial species, is a bandicoot found only on the northern and eastern coasts of Australia and nearby islands, mainly New Guinea. It is not, however, found far inland.

== Taxonomy ==
A major study published in October 2026, identified a new species, which it named Isoodon moresbyensis, or New Guinea brown bandicoot. It was formerly thought that this animal was a subspecies of the northern brown bandicoot.

== Description ==
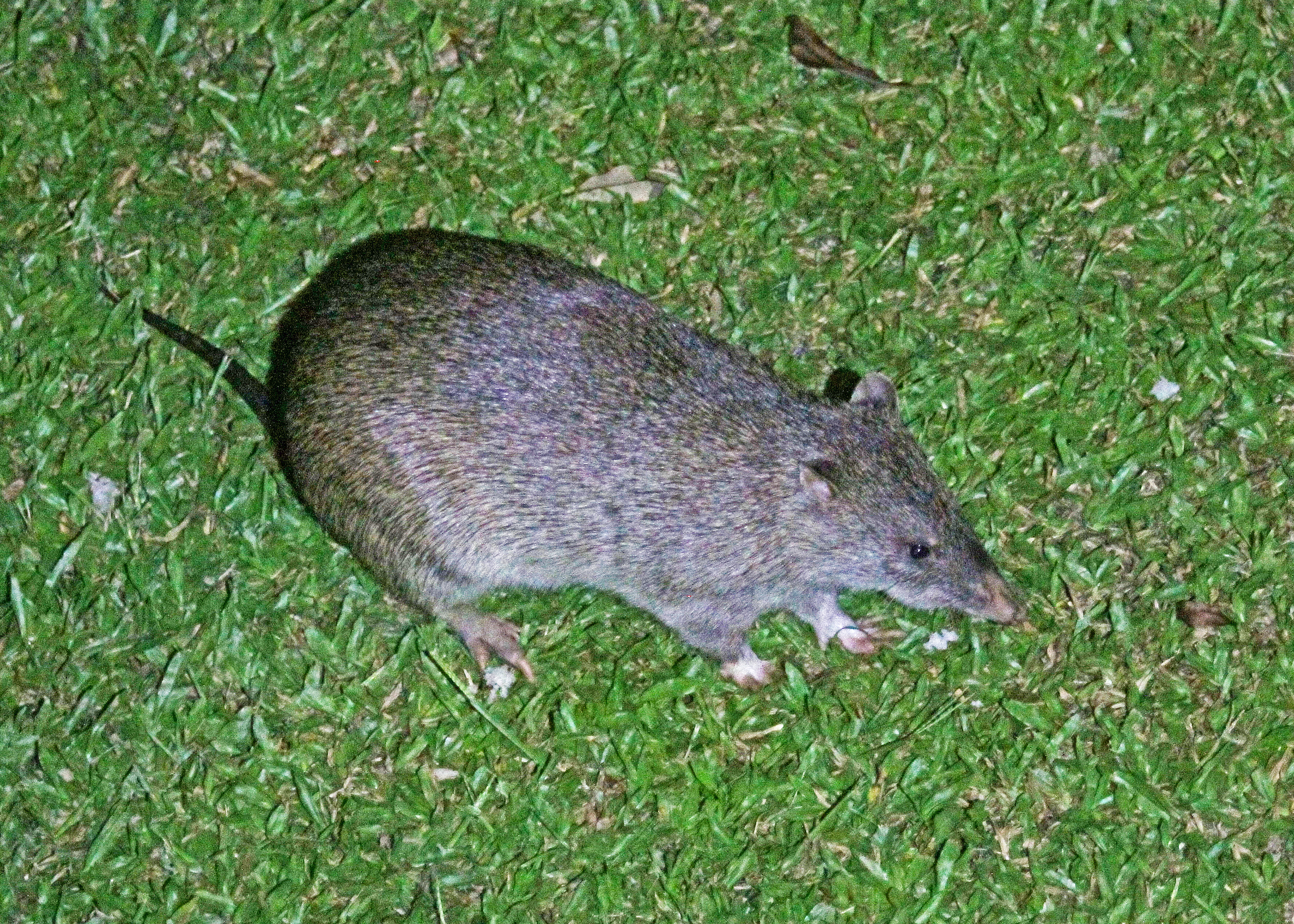
Northern brown bandicoot in Daintree, Queensland Australia

This species can be set apart from other marsupials by two traits; it is both polyprotodont (i.e., several pairs of lower front teeth) and syndactylous. The northern brown bandicoot has typical body and tail lengths of 40 and 15 cm (15.7 and 5.9 in), respectively. On average it weighs 1,200 g (2.6 lb). This marsupial has a thick harsh coat but is not spiny. The dorsal pelage is light brown in appearance with speckled black patterns throughout. On the ventral surface it is solid white. The northern brown bandicoot has a reverse pouch so it won't fill with soil when digging. This bandicoot also has short, rounded ears and a short nose. One can easily mistake the northern brown bandicoot for the southern brown bandicoot. The two species differ in both size, with the northern brown bandicoot larger, and regional locality, in that the southern brown bandicoot is found only on the southern coastline of Australia.

The male is typically 5–7 cm (2.0–2.8 in) longer and about 0.5 kilograms (1.1 lb) heavier than the female.

== Ecology ==
The populations of the northern brown bandicoot live in two different habitats: one during the dry season and the other during the wet season. During the dry season, this species lives in thick vegetation consisting of tall weeds, small trees, and dense shrubs. This probably occurs because of the sparse food supply that can be found. During the wet season though, the northern brown bandicoot "comes out" and roams open grasslands where sources of food are more abundant.

The northern brown bandicoot is one of relatively few native Australian ground-dwelling mammals that is able to survive within urbanized landscapes. The generalized dietary and habitat requirements, as well as a high reproductive output, undoubtedly facilitate the survival of the species in urban habitat fragments.

The northern brown bandicoot makes individual nests or homes on the ground consisting of simple mounds of hay and twigs that are well camouflaged and waterproof. The inside is hollow and large enough for just the single bandicoot. Some bandicoots use hollowed-out tree trunks or abandoned rabbit dens for shelter. In general, however, the northern brown bandicoot shows a strong preference for homes in areas of low ground cover.

The northern brown bandicoot is omnivorous. It eats insects, earthworms, berries, and grass seeds. Sometimes when food is scarce, the female bandicoot will eat her young. This marsupial forages alone during the night and has a keen sense of smell. This allows it to find food either laying in the open or buried underground. Hunting at night, however, also has its consequences. The bandicoot is prime prey for many nocturnal cats, foxes, and owls found in Australia. The Northern brown bandicoot is a host of the Acanthocephalan intestinal parasite Australiformis semoni.

== Life history ==
The northern brown bandicoot diligently marks and retains its territory. It has scent glands on the ears, mouth, pouch, and cloaca. This solitary marsupial is aggressive only towards others of its species. If a bandicoot is startled in its nesting site, it will flee. Hardly ever will the northern brown bandicoot defend itself unless two males confront one another over territorial rights. Then, either a male is killed or one male becomes subordinate to the other and avoids confrontation. The subordinate male also forfeits to the dominant male all sexual relations with local females. Bandicoots are not social animals and do not live in groups, with the exception of mother and her young.

The northern brown bandicoot breeds throughout the year. An average litter consists of 2 to 4 young. Being marsupials, the newborns are naked and immature and thus undergo extensive development within the mother's pouch. The gestation period (12.5 days) is the shortest recorded for any mammal. Bandicoots are also the only metatherian marsupials that have placentas similar to eutherian mammals. Juveniles are weaned at 60 days post partum. By this time, the marsupial young are capable of sustaining endothermy on their own. I. macrourus have a lifespan of approximately two years.

Female bandicoots produce between 8 and 11 litters in their lifetime. Male bandicoots don't play a significant role in the care of juvenile I. macrourus.

The name bandicoot is based on their rather ratlike appearance. The name comes from a corruption of an Indian word "pandi-kokku" signifying "pig-rat".

== Conservation status ==
Over the past century, populations of the northern brown bandicoot have decreased after the European introduction of rabbits and livestock into Australia. This dramatically heightened the direct competition for food and habitat. Bandicoot populations further suffered after the introduction of the fox and cat, both predators of small animals. Northern brown bandicoot populations in the Northern Territory are showing considerable declines, with one study in the Northern Territory finding a 35% reduction in the breadth of occupied environmental space. As there was only a small (1–2%) reduction in their extent of occurrence, the study concluded that the species is contracting to areas of higher rainfall, lower fire frequency, and higher vegetation cover.

== In Aboriginal language and culture ==
The Northern brown bandicoot is known as yok to the Kunwinjku people of western Arnhem Land, and for those still living on their country is an important food. It is stuffed with hot coals and bush herbs then covered with paperbark and cooked in a ground oven.

In Tiwi they are called kipopi or tukwatukini if male and marinyi or tukatuka if female. Skilled hunters observe the rise and fall in their nests, as their fur camouflages perfectly with their nest.
