= Bumaga Island =

Island in Australia

Coordinates: 11.7544°S 136.0856°E

Bumaga Island is an island in both the Wessel Islands group and the Cunningham Islands group in the Northern Territory of Australia.
