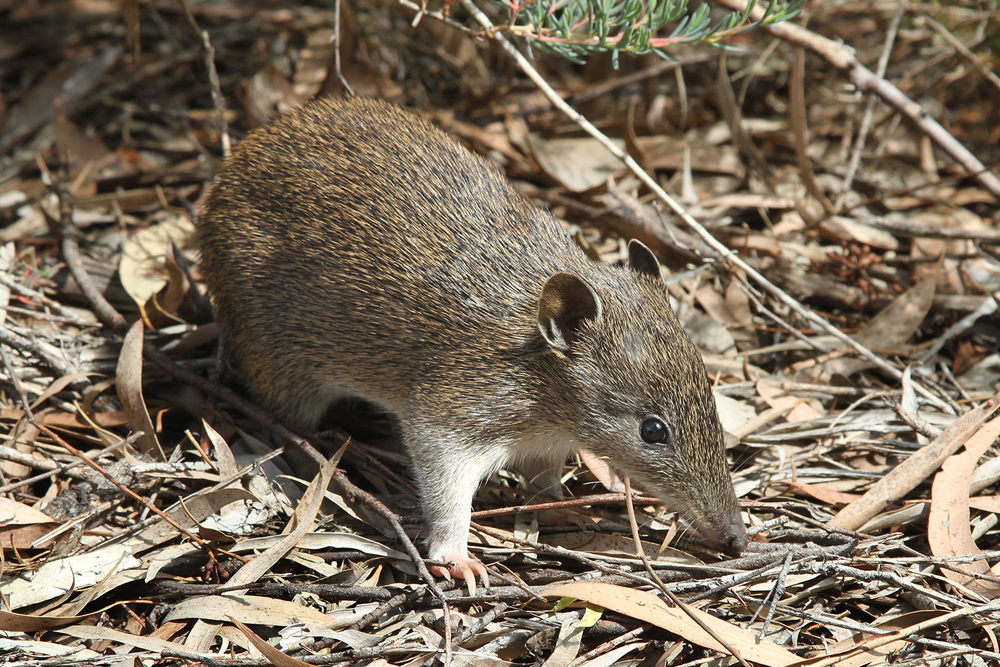
- Foraging adult

Conservation status
- Least Concern (IUCN 3.1)

- Endangered (EPBC Act)

Scientific classification
- Kingdom: Animalia
- Phylum: Chordata
- Class: Mammalia
- Infraclass: Marsupialia
- Order: Peramelemorphia
- Family: Peramelidae
- Genus: Isoodon
- Species: I. obesulus

Binomial name
- Isoodon obesulus (Shaw, 1797)

Subspecies
- Isoodon obesulus affinis; Isoodon obesulus nauticus; Isoodon obesulus obesulus
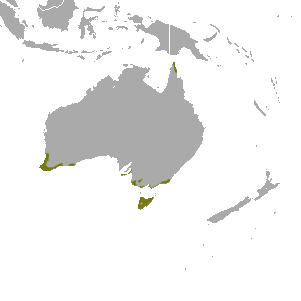
- Southern brown bandicoot range

Synonyms
- Didelphis obesula; Perameles obesula

= Southern brown bandicoot =

Species of marsupial

The southern brown bandicoot (Isoodon obesulus) is a short-nosed bandicoot, a type of marsupial, found mostly in southern Australia. There are three recognised subspecies: Isoodon obesulus affinis, Isoodon obesulus nauticus, and Isoodon obesulus obesulus, with differing ranges. They are found in the states of New South Wales, Victoria, South Australia, and Tasmania. I.o. obesulus is listed nationally as Endangered, and Vulnerable in SA, while i.o. nauticus is listed as Vulnerable.

== Taxonomy ==
The species was first described as Didelphis obesula by George Shaw in 1797. There are three subspecies recognised by the Atlas of Living Australia:

- Isoodon obesulus affinis – Tasmania and Bass Strait Islands (Waterhouse, 1846)
- Isoodon obesulus nauticus – Restricted to the Nuyts Archipelago, SA (Thomas, 1922)
- Isoodon obesulus obesulus – NSW, Victoria, SA ((Shaw, 1797)

=== 2018 reclassification ===
The quenda (Isoodon fusciventer) and the Cape York brown bandicoot (Isoodon peninsulae) were previously considered subspecies of the southern brown bandicoot before being elevated to full species status.

The quenda in South Western Australia was formerly thought to be a subspecies of the southern brown bandicoot, but a 2018 paper proposed to raise it to species rank due to molecular and morphological analysis which revealed it was more closely related to the golden bandicoot (Isoodon auratus). This subspecies was elevated to species in 2018.

=== 2026 reclassification ===
A major study by Travouillon et al., "Genetic and morphological reassessment of the genus Isoodon (Marsupialia: Peramelemorphia) and description of new species and subspecies" was published in the Australian Journal of Taxonomy in October 2026. The study aimed to reassess species and subspecies boundaries within the genus Isoodon.

Among other findings, the study determined that the bandicoots presently living in the Mount Lofty Ranges (Adelaide Hills), Fleurieu Peninsula, and on Kangaroo Island in South Australia, previously thought to be southern browns, are in fact related to quendas, and are now considered their own subspecies, named Isoodon fusciventer terrenus. Previous classifications suggested that only one species, the southern brown bandicoot, occurred in SA, but this study also identified an extinct species, Isoodon microtis, or little brown bandicoot, had been present in the state.

== Description ==
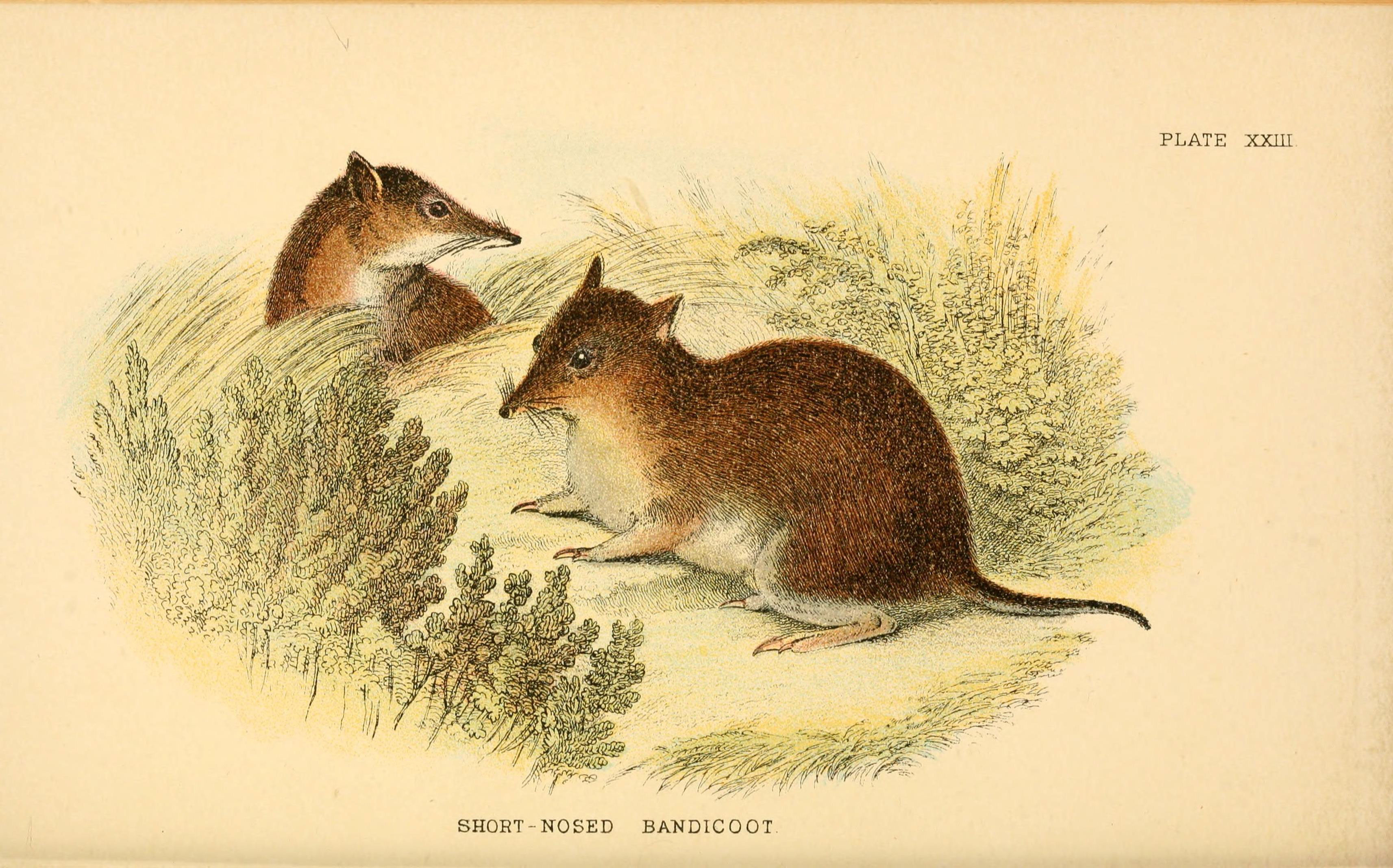
19th-century illustration

Southern brown bandicoots have a stocky body with a short snout and short, rounded ears. They show sexual dimorphism, with females being smaller than males. On average, males measure 50 cm (20 in) in total length, and weigh up to 1.2 kg (2.6 lb), while females measure 40 cm (16 in) and weigh no more than 1 kg (2.2 lb). They have coarse, bristly hair that is grizzled and coloured a dark greyish to yellowish brown, with the undersides a creamy-white or yellowish grey. The tail is relatively short, measuring about 13 cm (5.1 in) in length, and is brown above and white below.

There are five toes on each foot, although, as in many other marsupials, they are syndactylous, with the second and third toes of the hind foot are fused along almost their entire length. The toes end in sturdy claws, except for the first digits of the fore feet and the fifth digits of the hind feet, which are tiny and vestigial. The pouch in females opens to the rear, and contains eight teats arranged in a partial circle.

== Distribution and habitat ==
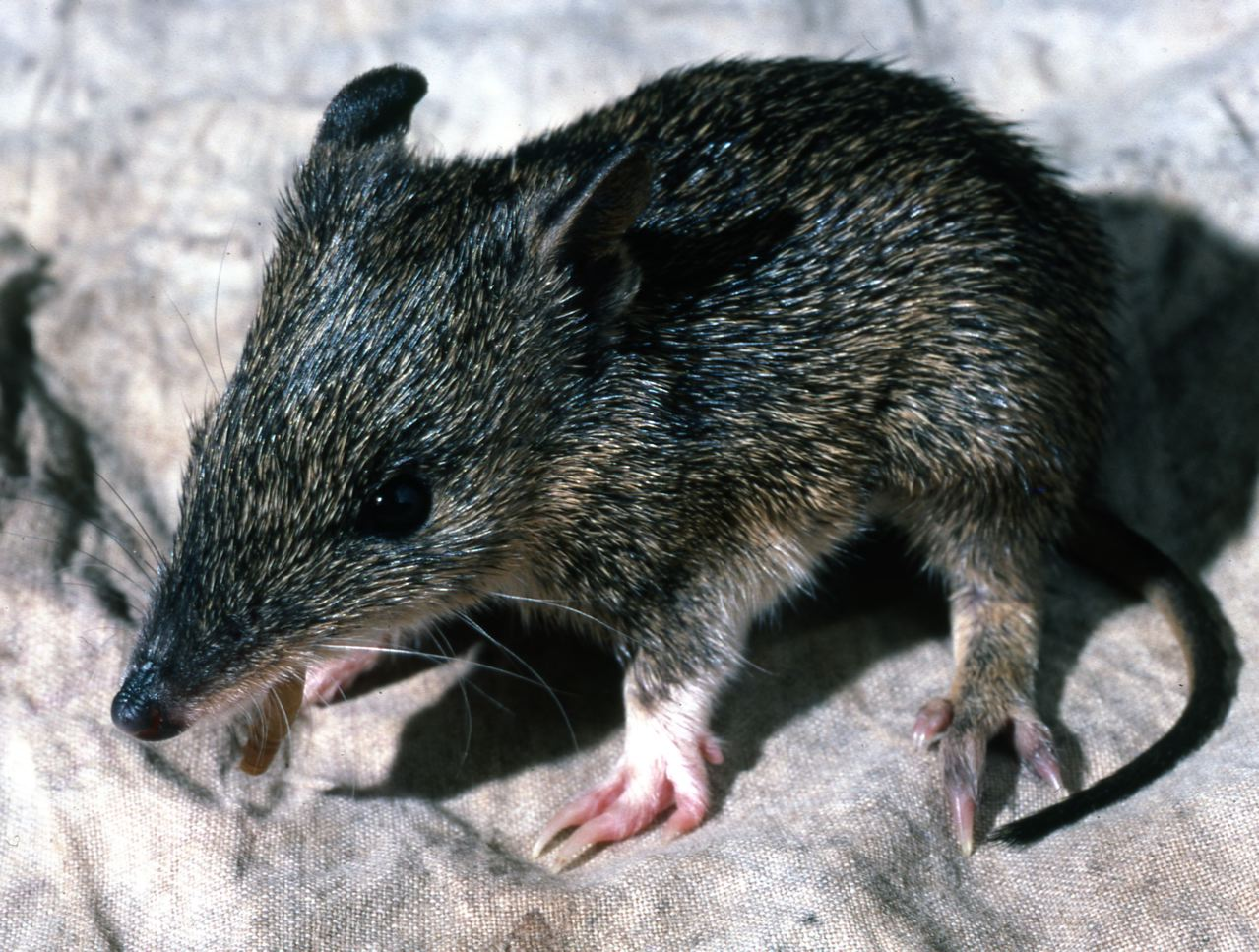
Juvenile I.o. obesulus, Victoria

Once common throughout many parts of coastal Australia, today southern brown bandicoots have a more limited distribution. An isolated population exists at the north-eastern part of the Cape York Peninsula in Queensland, but all other surviving animals are found in the southern half of the country. In New South Wales they are considered rare, and are primarily restricted to the extreme south-east of the state and to two national parks north of Sydney. In Victoria, they are more common, being found along the whole length of the coast and at up to 1,000 m (3,300 ft) in the Grampian and Dandenong mountains.

In South Australia, they were previously thought to inhabit the Eyre and Fleurieu peninsulas, the extreme southeast, and Kangaroo Island. However, the 2026 reclassification shows that the bandicoots living in the Adelaide Hills, Fleurieu Peninsula, and Kangaroo Island are not southern brown bandicoots, but a subspecies of quenda.

Isolated and increasingly restricted populations are known from south-western Western Australia. However, southern brown bandicoots are most common in Tasmania, where they are found across almost the entire island. They are also currently found on Inner Sister Island but have been extirpated from many other small Tasmanian islands where they once lived.

Within these regions, southern brown bandicoots inhabit open forest, scrub, and heathland, especially where there is extensive ground cover by shrubs or mat-rushes. I. o. obesulus has shown a preference for the margins of artificial waterways over drier habitats.

== Biology and behaviour ==
Southern brown bandicoots are nocturnal and omnivorous, feeding on insects, spiders, worms, plant roots, ferns, and fungi. They spend very little time drinking, being able to obtain sufficient water from their diet alone. Although their native predators include barn owls, tiger snakes, and quolls, the bandicoots do not avoid the odour of these animals, which may make them vulnerable to predation. They do, however, typically avoid one another, living solitary lives in non-overlapping home ranges that typically vary from 1 to 5 hectares (2.5 to 12.4 acres), depending on the local conditions. If males encounter one another, the more dominant individual leaps onto the back of the other, scratching with its claws. Because the skin of bandicoots is unusually thick, this results in hair loss, but little permanent injury to the defeated male.

They spend much of the night searching for food, which the detect primarily by scent, sniffing the ground before digging into with their claws. They pursue any prey that escapes, holding it down with their forepaws as they consume it. The digging behaviour is considered a critical component in the maintenance of the ecosystems in which they live. It is estimated that a single bandicoot displaces around 3.9 tonnes of soil each year. They spend the day sleeping in well-concealed nests of shredded vegetation. Both sexes possess scent glands between the ears that are apparently used in intra-species communication and become enlarged during the breeding season.

The Southern brown bandicoot is a host of the Acanthocephalan intestinal parasite Australiformis semoni.

=== Life history ===
Reproduction is closely linked to local rainfall pattern, and many brown bandicoots breed all year around, giving birth to up to four litters a year. Gestation lasts less than fifteen days, and perhaps as few as twelve, and typically results in the birth of two or three young, although litters of up to five have been reported; larger mothers tend to give birth to larger litters.

The young weigh just 350 mg (5.4 gr) at birth, remain in the pouch for about the first 53 days of life, and are fully weaned at around 60 days. Growth and maturation is relatively rapid among marsupials, with females becoming sexually mature at four to five months of age, and males at six or seven months. Lifespan in the wild is probably no more than four years.

== Conservation status ==
The southern brown bandicoot is currently classified as Least Concern by the IUCN. However, populations have declined markedly and become much more fragmented in the time since European expansion on the Australian mainland. In many areas of its range the species is threatened locally, while it may be common where rainfall is high enough and vegetation cover is thick enough. Apart from habitat fragmentation, the species is under pressure from introduced predators such as the red fox and feral cats. It has been reintroduced to some lower rainfall areas where there is protection against cat and fox predation – one such site being Wadderin Sanctuary in the eastern wheatbelt of Western Australia, 300 km (190 mi) east of Perth.

As of November 2026, Isoodon obesulus obesulus — Southern Brown Bandicoot (eastern), Southern Brown Bandicoot (south-eastern) is listed as nationally endangered under the EPBC Act, a status applied in 2001. It is listed as Endangered in the ACT, New South Wales, and Victoria, and as Vulnerable in SA. The 2026 reclassification has implications for this subspecies' status in South Australia: it suggests that its range is smaller than thought previously, so the species may face an even greater conservation risk under the new classification.

Isoodon obesulus nauticus – Southern Brown Bandicoot (Nuyts Archipelago) is isted as Vulnerable nationally under the EPBC Act as well as in SA, under the state's National Parks and Wildlife Act 1972 (2020 list).
