= Rimbija Island =

Island off the Northern Australian coast

Coordinates: 11.0128°S 136.7489°E

Rimbija Island is the northernmost island of the Wessel Islands group in the Northern Territory of Australia. The most northerly point of the small island is called Cape Wessel. It is separated from Marchinbar Island to the south by a narrow strait, and Emu Islet a little further to the southwest.
