= Middle Island (Barrow Island) =

Island in Western Australia

Coordinates: 20°54′31″S 115°19′36″E

Middle Island is an island south of Barrow Island, Western Australia.
