= Marchinbar Island =

Island of the Northern Territory, Australia

- Interactive map of Marchinbar Island

Geography
- Coordinates: 11°16′40.72″S 136°37′20.26″E
- Area: 245.52 km^{2} (94.80 sq mi)
- Length: 55.87 km (34.716 mi)
- Width: 0.25–8.01 km (0.16–4.98 mi)
- Highest elevation: 138 m (453 ft)

Marchinbar Island is the largest island in the Wessel Islands in the Northern Territory of Australia in the Arafura Sea.

== Location ==
It is separated from Rimbija Island, the most north-easterly of the Wessel Islands, by a narrow channel, which is less than 364 metres (1,194 ft) metres across at its narrowest point. In the south-east, it is separated from Guluwuru Island by Cumberland Strait, which is 1,664 metres (5,459 ft) metres wide at its narrowest point.

== Geomorphology ==
The island is long and narrow, 57.4 kilometres (35.7 mi) long and maximally 8 kilometres (5 mi) wide. It measures 210.9 square kilometres (81.4 sq mi) in area. The most northerly point of the island is called Low Point. Sphinx Head is a site of conspicuous cliffs up to 67 metres (220 ft) high, about 16 kilometres (9.9 mi) SSW of Low Point. Two flat-topped hills south of Sphinx Head rise to a maximum height of 79 metres (259 ft). The entire east coast of the island is cliffy and high.

== Administration ==
Administratively, Marchinbar Island is part of Gumurr Marthakal Ward of East Arnhem Region.

== Settlement ==
The only settlement is Martjanba, a small family outstation on Jensen Bay in the northern part of the island.

== Habitat ==
Marchinbar Island was until recently the last habitat still containing a population of the golden bandicoot (Isoodon auratus), which was once found throughout northern, central and western Australia, and as far south as New South Wales. As part of a salvage operation to ensure diversification, numbers of the Marchinbar Island bandicoots have been translocated to the islands of Raragala and Guluwuru.

== Discovery of ancient coins ==
In 1944, nine coins were discovered at Djinjan creek immediately south of Jensen Bay. Four of the coins were later identified as Dutch duits dating from 1690 to the 1780s while five with Arabic inscriptions were identified as being from the Kilwa Sultanate of east Africa. Only one such Kilwan coin had ever previously been found outside east Africa (unearthed during an excavation in Oman). The inscriptions on the Jensen Bay coins identify a ruling Sultan of Kilwa, but it is unclear whether the ruler was from the 10th century or the 14th century. This discovery has been of interest to those historians who believe it likely that seafaring people made landfall in Australia or its offshore islands after Aboriginal settlement and before the first generally accepted such sighting, by the Dutch sailor Willem Janszoon in 1606. A similar coin, also thought to be from the Medieval Kilwa sultanate, was found in 2018 on Elcho Island, also in the Wessel Islands group.

== Sources ==
- Clausen, Lisa (14 September 2013). "Out of Africa". The Sydney Morning Herald.
- Gornall, Jonathan (29 May 2013). "Were the African coins found in Australia from a wrecked Arab dhow?". The National. Archived from the original on 6 July 2013.
- "Marchinbar". Island Directory. 29 May 2013.
- McIntosh, Ian S. (2012). "Life and Death on the Wessel Islands: The Case of Australia's Mysterious African Coin Cache" (PDF). Australian Folklore. 27: 9–26.
- Palmer, Carol; Woinarski, John; Hill, Brydie (December 2012). "Golden Bandicoot" (PDF). Government of the Northern Territory. pp. 1–3.
