= Raragala Island =

Island in Northern Territory, Australia

Coordinates: 11.6102°S 136.26°E

Geography
- Location: Arafura Sea
- Archipelago: Wessel Islands
- Area: 89 km^{2} (34 sq mi)

Administration
- Australia

Raragala Island is one of the Wessel Islands in Northern Territory, Australia. Its area is 89 km^{2}.
