= Wessel Islands =

Group of islands of Northern Territory, Australia

Location of Wessel Islands in Northern Territory

The Wessel Islands is a group of uninhabited islands in the Northern Territory of Australia. They extend in a more or less straight line from Buckingham Bay and the Napier Peninsula of Arnhem Land, and Elcho Island, to the northeast. Marchinbar Island is the largest of the group. Other islands include Elcho Island, Rimbija Island (the most outlying island), Guluwuru, Raragala, Stevens Island, Burgunngura, Djeergaree, Yargara, Drysdale Island, Jirrgari Island, Graham Island, Alger Island, Abbott Island, and Howard Island.

Bumaga Island and Warnawi Island, both part of the Wessel Islands group, are also part of the Cunningham Islands.

== History ==
The Wessel Islands constituted the homelands of the Nango or Yan-nhaŋu.

=== European exploration and naming ===
The islands were mapped and named by a Dutch expedition that sailed from Banda Neira to explore the coasts of New Guinea and the South Land following up on discoveries made in 1623 by Jan Carstensz and Willem van Colster (who named Arnhem Land after his ship Arnhem). The expedition used two small yachts that had been prefabricated in the Netherlands and were assembled on the Banda Islands, the Cleen Amsterdam and the Wesel.

The ships sailed on 17 April 1636 under the command of Gerrit Thomas Pool, who was killed on New Guinea just 11 days later. The merchant Pieter Pieterszoon took over command and continued the voyage, returning to Banda. Besides the Wesel Eilanden, named after the ship, Pietersen described the Cobourg Peninsula, Melville Island (Roode hoek), and Dundas Strait (which he misidentified as a bay). 170 years later Matthew Flinders decided to retain the name of the islands, though he slightly modified it to Wessel. The cities of Arnhem and Wesel, ultimate sources of the names of Arnhem Land and Wessel Islands, are themselves only 60 km (37 miles) separated.

Much of the population of the Wessel Islands was decimated by smallpox. It may have been introduced from Makassar by Makassan traders during the 1790s, though there is also evidence that smallpox spread from Sydney Cove, after 'variolous matter' was brought there in 1788 by the First Fleet. This dried matter from smallpox scabs was used in a technique called variolation, which was used as protection against the disease prior to the development of vaccination. By the early nineteenth century, many of the Yolngu clans had been wiped out.

=== World War II and modern era ===
During World War II, a string of observational outposts were set up along the Wessel Islands. A minesweeper, the Patricia Cam, was sunk by a Japanese float plane on 22 January 1943. A Yolngu account of the incident, and attempts to save the survivors was taken down from one of the latter, Narritjin Maymuru.

Since the 1960s, the islands have had no permanent settlements.

== Extent and geography ==
The islands extend in a more or less straight line from Buckingham Bay and the Napier Peninsula of Arnhem Land, and Elcho Island, to the northeast. Marchinbar Island is the largest of the group. Other islands include Elcho Island, Rimbija Island (the most outlying island), Guluwuru, Raragala, Stevens Island, Burgunngura, Djeergaree, Yargara, Drysdale Island, Jirrgari Island, Graham Island, Alger Island, Abbott Island, and Howard Island.

Bumaga Island and Warnawi Island, both part of the Wessel Islands group, are also part of the Cunningham Islands.

Marchinbar has bauxite deposits.

Most of its bays are unnamed, with only three bearing names, including Picture Bay.

Easterly trade winds and swells hit the east coast through much of the year, but in the summer, westerly winds are prevalent, and the eastern side is calm, but subject to heavy rainfall, creating many waterfalls.

== Archaeology and ecology ==
=== Marchinbar coins ===
In 1944, Australian soldier Morry Isenberg found nine coins buried in the sand one day while fishing when he was stationed on Marchinbar Island. In 1979 he sent these coins to be authenticated. Four of the coins were found to have come from the Dutch East India Company, while the other five were determined to be from the Kilwa Sultanate in Tanzania. Their re-examination has given rise to much speculation about how these medieval African coins came to Australia. Another coin, believed to be from Kilwa, turned up on Elcho Island where it was found by Past Masters amateur archaeologist Mike Hermes in 2018.

=== Protection ===
Wessel is the name of the IBRA subregion based on the Islands area, as well as the Commonwealth marine reserve.

The archipelago is known for its biodiversity, and harbours several endangered species.

=== Plastic waste ===
Researchers from the Charles Darwin University reported in early 2022 that the problem of plastic waste landing up on the islands was a worsening problem. Many types of plastics, including fishing gear, ghost nets, plastic bottles, cartons, and styrofoam, have increasingly littered the shores since the first survey in 2011, and is probably the worst in Northern Australia. The Gumurr Marthakal Rangers have managed the area since 2016, and are concerned at the waste, but need assistance and ongoing funding to get it cleaned up as the problem is so extensive.

== Transport ==
Locals visit the islands by boat. Tourists can get to Gove Airport from Cairns using Airnorth, and take tours from there.

== See also ==
- Abbott Island (Wessel Islands)

== Sources ==
- "A Pictorial History of ELCHO ISLAND". Past Masters International.
- ERIN (2012). "Wessel Commonwealth Marine Reserve" (PDF). Department of Sustainability, Environment, Water, Population and Communities. Archived from the original (PDF) on 15 February 2013.
- Flinders, Matthew (1814). A voyage to terra Australis..in the years 1801-1803. London: Bulmer.
- Heeres, Jan Ernst (1899). Het aandeel der Nederlanders in de ontdekking van Australië 1606-1765. E.J. Brill.
- Judd, Bridget; Trevaskis, Liz (10 July 2018). "Coin found off Arnhem Land coast could be among Australia's oldest foreign artefacts". ABC Radio Darwin.
- Kirk, Robert W. (2012). Paradise Past: The Transformation of the South Pacific, 1520–1920. McFarland & Company. ISBN 978-0-786-49298-5.
- Long, Jeremy (1992). "The Sinking of the "Patricia Cam": Narritjin's s Story". Aboriginal History. 16 (1–2). Australian National University Press: 81–84. JSTOR 24046211.
- McIntosh, Ian S. (2012). "Life and Death on the Wessel Islands: The Case of Australia's Mysterious African Coin Cache" (PDF). Australian Folklore. 27: 9–26.
- Tindale, Norman Barnett (1974). "Nango (NT)". Aboriginal Tribes of Australia: Their Terrain, Environmental Controls, Distribution, Limits, and Proper Names. Australian National University. ISBN 978-0-708-10741-6. Archived from the original on 3 March 2021.
