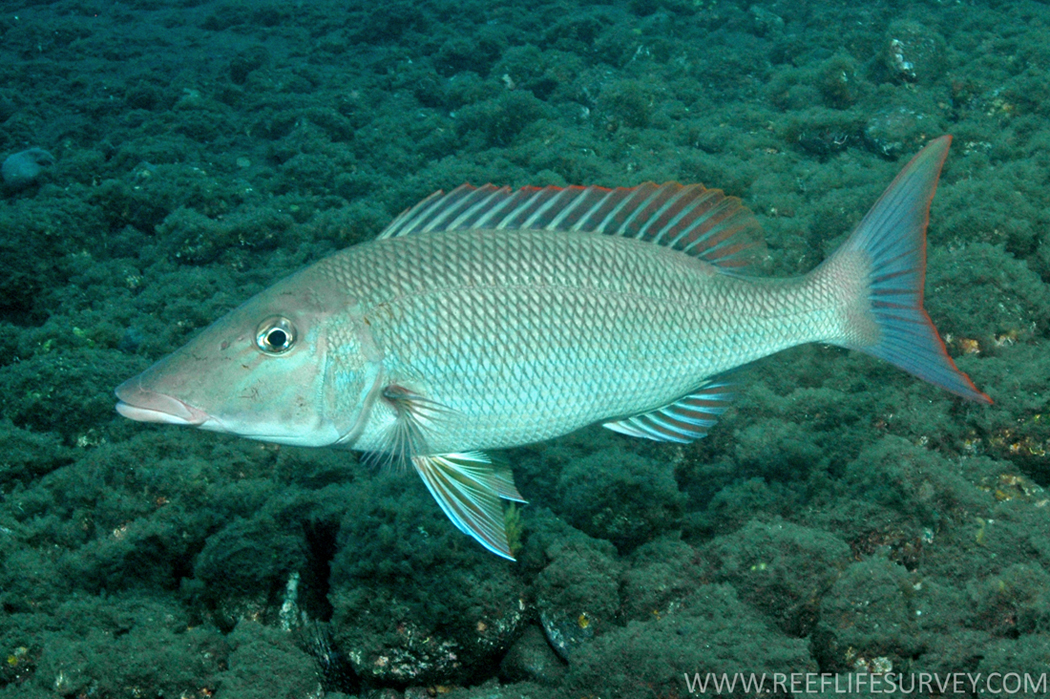
- Tulamben, Bali, Indonesia

Conservation status
- Least Concern (IUCN 3.1)

Scientific classification
- Kingdom: Animalia
- Phylum: Chordata
- Class: Actinopterygii
- Order: Acanthuriformes
- Family: Lethrinidae
- Genus: Lethrinus
- Species: L. amboinensis

Binomial name
- Lethrinus amboinensis Bleeker, 1854

= Lethrinus amboinensis =

Species of fish

Lethrinus amboinensis, the Ambon emperor, is a species of marine ray-finned fish belonging to the family Lethrinidae, the emperors and emperor breams. This species is found in the Western Pacific Ocean.

== Taxonomy ==
Lethrinus amboinensis was first formally described in 1854 by the Dutch physician, herpetologist, and ichthyologist Pieter Bleeker with its type locality given as Ambon Island. Some authors place the genus Lethrinus in the monotypic subfamily Lethrininae, with all the other genera of Lethrinidae placed in the Monotaxinae. However, the 5th edition of Fishes of the World does not recognise the subfamilies traditionally accepted within the family Lethrinidae as valid. The family Lethrinidae is classified by the 5th edition of Fishes of the World as belonging to the order Spariformes.

== Description ==
Lethrinus amboinensis has a continuous dorsal fin supported by 10 spines and 9 soft rays, while the anal fin has 3 spines and 9 soft rays. It has a moderately elongated body which has a depth of around one-third of its standard length. The overall colour of the body is yellowish, marked with scattered vague dark blotches, and a brown head, which may be marked with light streaks. It has reddish lips and an orange axil to the pectoral fin. The dorsal and caudal fins are mottled brown or yellow with an orange or reddish margin. This species has a maximum published total length of 70 cm (28 in), although 40 cm (16 in) is more typical.

== Distribution and habitat ==
Lethrinus amboinensis is found in the Western Pacific Ocean, where it ranges from Indonesia east to the Marshall Islands, Solomon Islands, Samoa, and the Marquesas, north to southern Japan, and south to northern Australia. It is found at depths between 5 and 30 m (16 and 98 ft) in coral reefs adjacent to sandy areas and in deeper lagoons.

== Biology ==
Lethrinus amboinensis feeds on fishes and crustaceans, but little is known about its biology, as it is difficult to identify larger individuals of this species from L. olivaceus and L. microdon.

== Fisheries ==
Lethrinus amboinenseis is targeted by fisheries, and they are caught using handlines, with the fish landed and sold fresh.
