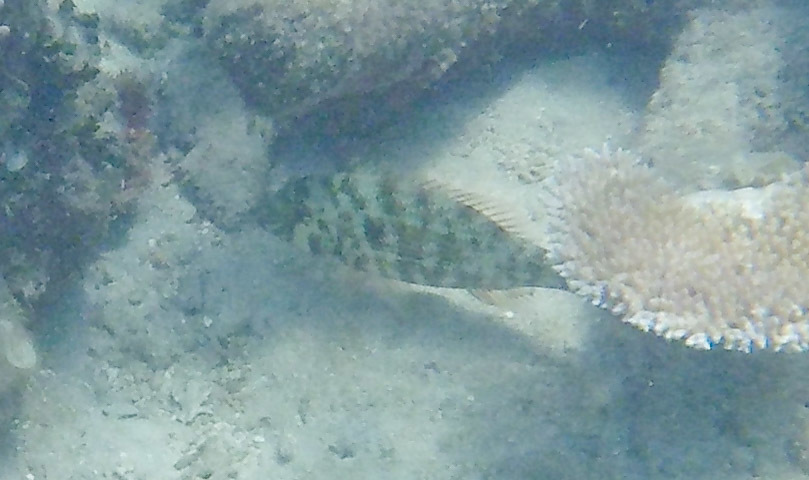

Conservation status
- Least Concern (IUCN 3.1)

Scientific classification
- Kingdom: Animalia
- Phylum: Chordata
- Class: Actinopterygii
- Division: Teleostei
- Order: Acanthuriformes
- Family: Lethrinidae
- Genus: Lethrinus
- Species: L. laticaudis

Binomial name
- Lethrinus laticaudis Alleyne & W. J. Macleay, 1877

Synonyms
- Lethrinus fletus Whitley, 1943; Lethrinus anarhynchus Postel, 1965

= Lethrinus laticaudis =

Species of fish

Lethrinus laticaudis, the grass emperor, blue-lined emperor, blue-spotted emperor, brown kelp-fish, brown morwong, brown sweetlip, coral bream, grass sweetlip, grey sweetlip, piggy, red throat, red-finned emperor, snapper bream, squire, sweet-lips or tricky snapper, is a species of marine ray-finned fish belonging to the family Lethrinidae, the emperors and emperor breams. This fish is found in the eastern Indian and western Pacific Oceans.

== Taxonomy ==
Lethrinus laticaudis was first formally described in 1877 by the Australian naturalists Haynes Gibbes Alleyne and William John Macleay with its type locality given as the Percy Islands off Queensland. The correct name for this species has caused some amount of confusion in recent literature, it has sometimes been called Lethrinus fraenatus, which is a junior synonym of Lethrinus nebulosus, and at other times the name Lethrinus fletus, a junior synonym of this species, has been applied. Some authors place the genus Lethrinus in the monotypic subfamily Lethrininae, with all the other genera of Lethrinidae placed in the Monotaxinae, however, the 5th edition of Fishes of the World does not recognise the subfamilies traditionally accepted within the family Lethrinidae as valid. The family Lethrinidae is classified by the 5th edition of Fishes of the World as belonging to the order Spariformes.

== Etymology ==
Lethrinus laticaudis has the specific name laticaudis which is a compound of latus, meaning "broad", and cauda, which means "tail". Alleyne and Macleay described its tail as "emarginated, wide-spread".

== Description ==
Lethrinus laticaudus has 10 spines and 9 soft rays supporting its dorsal fin while the anal fin has 3 spines and 8 soft rays. There are no scales on the cheeks but the axilla of the pectoral fin is densely scaled. The dorsal profile of the head is steep and slightly concave. There are blue lines radiating out from the eyes and blue lines across the cheeks. This fish can change their colour and patterning from plain tan, brown or yellow to a brown mottled pattern to camouflage itself. The paired fins are yellow and the dorsal and anal fins are mottled. This species has a maximum published total length of 56 cm (22 in), although 36 cm (14 in) is more typical.

== Distribution and habitat ==
Lethrinus laticaudis is found in the eastern Indian Ocean and the western Pacific Ocean. It ranges from southern Indonesia and northern Australia east to the Solomon Islands, Vanuatu and New Caledonia. These fishes live at depths between 5 and 35 m (16 and 115 ft) adult fishes live in coral reefs while the juveniles prefer seagrass beds and mangroves.

== Biology ==
Lethrinus laticaudis feeds mainly on crustaceans and fishes. The females are smaller and more numerous than the males, this species is a protogynous hermaphrodite. Grass emperors spawn in batches with each spawning event seeing between 50,000 and 150,000 eggs released by a female. Off Western Australia spawning commences in December, peaks in January and finishes in March.

== Fisheries ==
Lethrinus laticaudus is a valued foodfish which is mostly sold as fresh fish. It is mainly caught using handlines It is a popolular and frequently caught fish for recreational fishers, especially in Western Australia.
