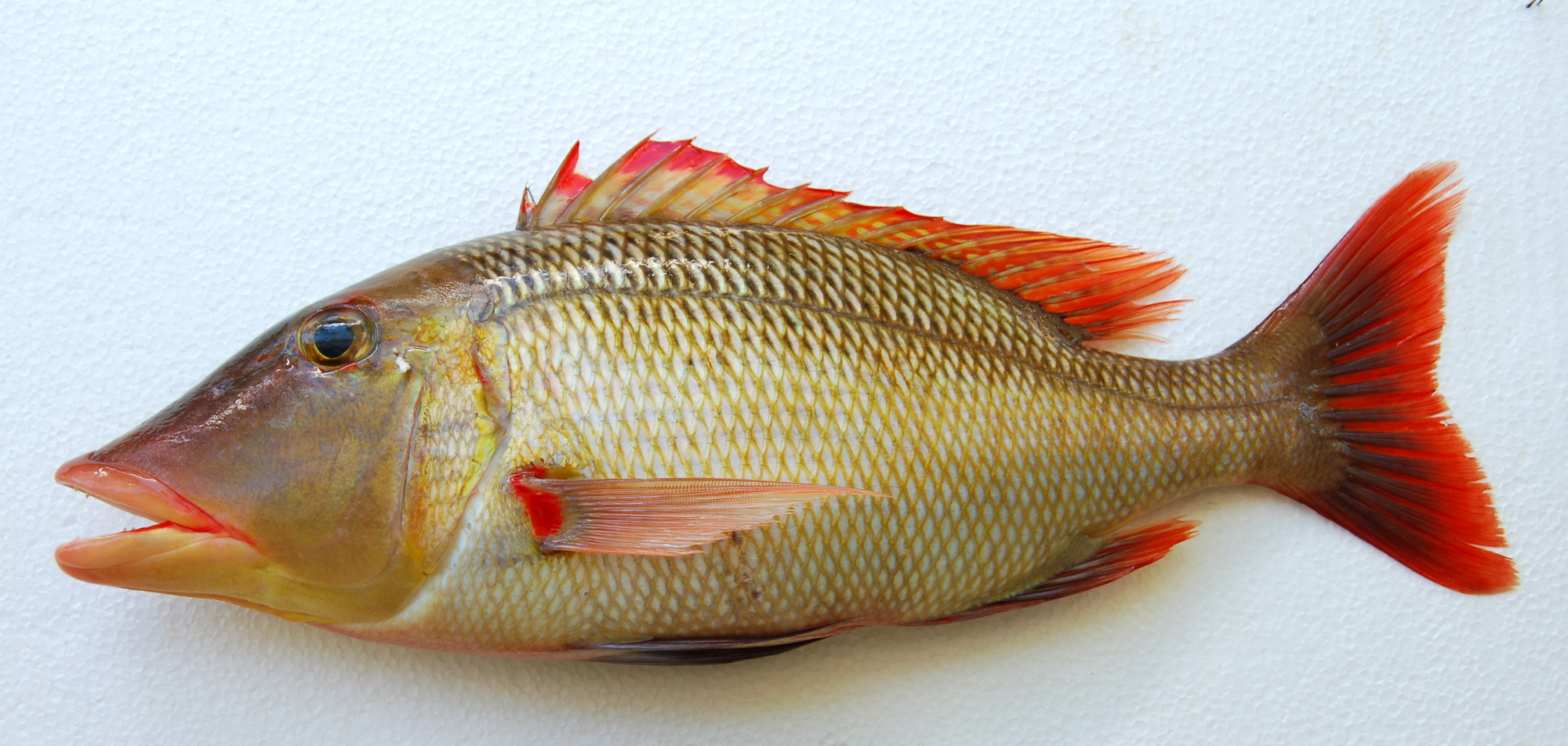

Conservation status
- Least Concern (IUCN 3.1)

Scientific classification
- Kingdom: Animalia
- Phylum: Chordata
- Class: Actinopterygii
- Division: Teleostei
- Order: Acanthuriformes
- Family: Lethrinidae
- Genus: Lethrinus
- Species: L. miniatus

Binomial name
- Lethrinus miniatus (J. R. Forster, 1801)

Synonyms
- Sparus miniatus Forster, 1801; Lethrinella miniata (Forster, 1801); Lethrinella miniatus (Forster, 1801); Lethrinus chrysostomus Richardson, 1848; Lethrinus imperialis De Vis, 1884; Lethrinus amamianus Akazaki, 1962

= Lethrinus miniatus =

Species of fish

Lethrinus miniatus, the trumpet emperor, redthroat emperor, sweetlip emperor, Sweetlip Swoose, island snapper, yellowmouth perch, yellowmouth snapper, lipper or nannygal, is a species of marine ray-finned fish belonging to the family Lethrinidae, the emperors and emperor breams. This species is found the eastern Indo-West Pacific region.

== Taxonomy ==
Lethrinus miniatus was first formally described as Sparus miniatus in 1801 by the German naturalist Johann Reinhold Forster with its type locality given as Tonga and New Caledonia. In the past the most frequently used binomial for this taxon was Lethrinus chrysostomus and the binomial L. miniatus was thought to be a synonym of L. olivaceus but in 1991 John Ernest Randall and Alwynne Cooper Wheeler examined the iconotype of Sparus miniatus and found that it was clearly what was then commonly referred to as L. chrysostomus. Some authors place the genus Lethrinus in the monotypic subfamily Lethrininae, with all the other genera of Lethrinidae placed in the Monotaxinae, however, the 5th edition of Fishes of the World does not recognise the subfamilies traditionally accepted within the family Lethrinidae as valid. The family Lethrinidae is classified by the 5th edition of Fishes of the World as belonging to the order Spariformes.

== Etymology ==
Lethrinus miniatus has the specific name miniatus, meaning "bright red" or "scarlet", an allusion to the reddish colour of the lips and/or vivid red colour sometimes visible between spines of the dorsal fin.

== Description ==
Lethrinus miniatus has a deep body with its standard length being between 2.4 and 2.8 times its depth. The dorsal fin is supported by 10 spines and 9 soft rays while the anal fin is supported by3 spines and 8 soft rays. The colour of the body varies from silver to light greyish-brown. The head shows a reddish hue and sometimes there are 8-9 darker vertical bars on the body. The base of the pectoral fin is bright red; the fins are pale to reddish in colour except that the spiny parts of the dorsal and anal fins are bright red. There is frequently a streak of red running from the snout to the upper operculum. They typically have reddish lips and usually the centre of each scale is dark. This species has a maximum published total length of 90 cm (35 in), although 40 cm (16 in) is more typical.

== Distribution and habitat ==
Lethrinus miniatus is found in the Eastern Indian and Western Pacific Oceans. In Australia, this species ranges from Cape Freycinet in Western Australia north and east along the coasts as far as Sydney. It is also found in the Philippines, the Ryukyu Islands and New Caledonia. The adults spend the day on coral reefs rarely moving into sand and rubble areas between patches of coral to feed. During the night, they leave the reef and go to areas of sandy substrates where they actively hunt. Juveniles are found in sea grass beds and mangroves, preferring shallower, coastal waters.

== Biology ==
Lethrinus miniatus is a predatory species feeding on crustaceans, molluscs, echinoderms and fishes, it diet being mainly crabs and sea urchins. They are found in small schools. This species is a protogynous hermaphrodite.

== Fisheries ==
Lethrinus miniatus is caught by Handline fishing and dropline. It is greatly favoured as a game and food fish along the Great Barrier Reef. It is an important commercial species in New Caledonia but it is often discarded there because it has been implicated in cases of ciguatera fish poisoning. The trumpet emperor dominates the dropline fishery off Norfolk Island.
