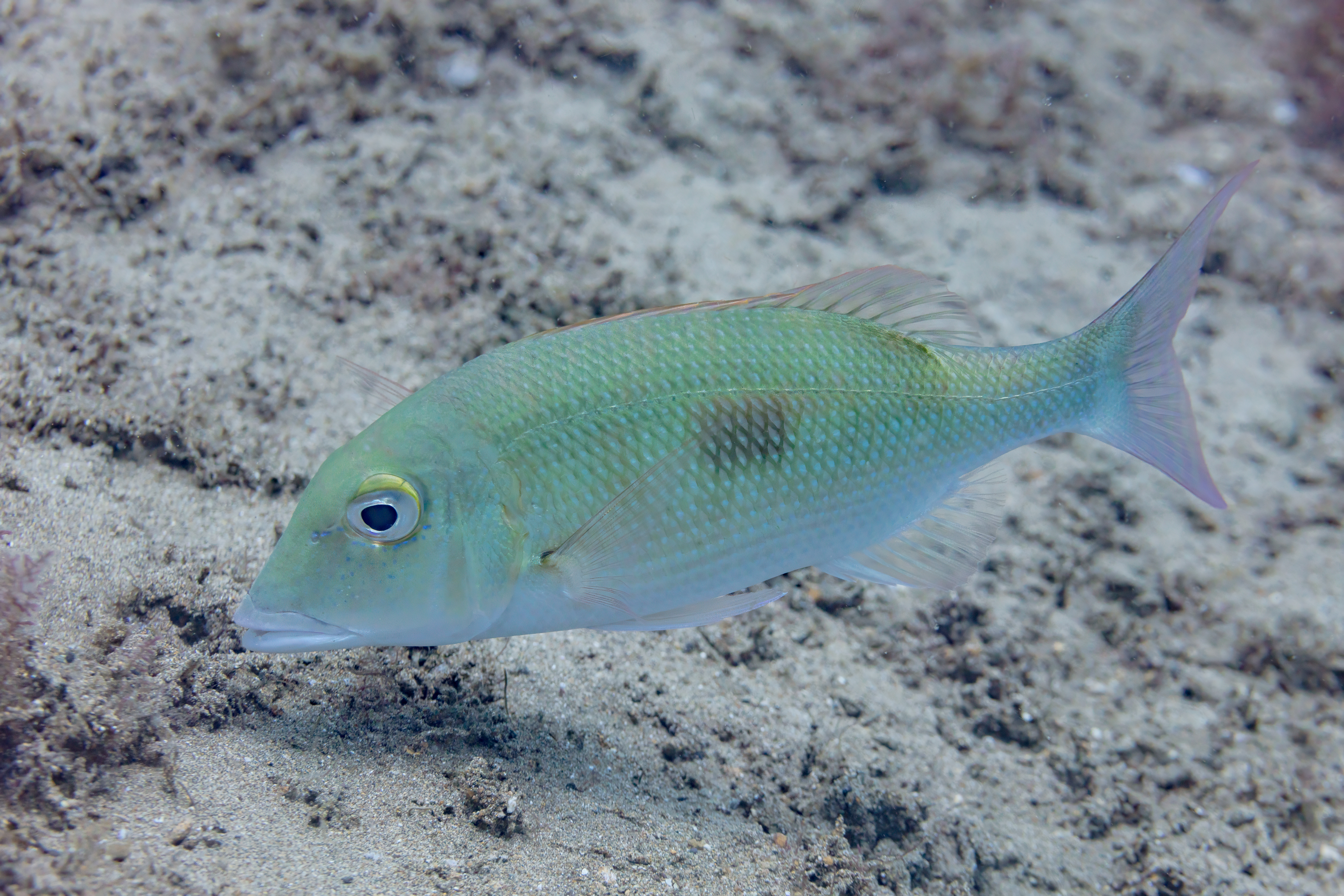

Conservation status
- Least Concern (IUCN 3.1)

Scientific classification
- Kingdom: Animalia
- Phylum: Chordata
- Class: Actinopterygii
- Division: Teleostei
- Order: Acanthuriformes
- Family: Lethrinidae
- Genus: Lethrinus
- Species: L. harak

Binomial name
- Lethrinus harak (Fabricius in Niebuhr (ex Forsskål), 1775)

Synonyms
- Lethrinus azureus Valenciennes, 1830; Lethrinus bleekeri Klunzinger, 1884; Lethrinus bonhamensis Günther, 1874; Lethrinus johnii Castelnau, 1873; Lethrinus papuensis Alleyne & MacLeay, 1877; Lethrinus rhodopterus Bleeker, 1852; Sciaena harak Fabricius, 1775

= Lethrinus harak =

Species of fish

Lethrinus harak, the thumbprint emperor, Jimothey, blackblotch emperor or blackspot emperor, is a species of marine ray-finned fish belonging to the Family Lethrinidae. the emperors and emperor breams. This species is found in the Indo-Pacific region.

== Taxonomy ==
Lethrinus harak was first formally described as Sciaena harak in 1775 by the Danish zoologist Johan Christian Fabricius and published in Descriptiones animalium edited by Carsten Niebuhr. Fabricius based his description on the notes of Peter Forsskål who had died while on an expedition, which Neibuhr was also a member of, to Arabia. No Type locality was given but it is assumed to be the Red Sea. Some authors place the genus Lethrinus in the monotypic subfamily Lethrininae, with all the other genera of Lethrinidae placed in the Monotaxinae, however, the 5th edition of Fishes of the World does not recognise the subfamilies traditionally accepted within the family Lethrinidae as valid. The family Lethrinidae is classified by the 5th edition of Fishes of the World as belonging to the order Spariformes.

== Etymology ==
Lethrinus harak has the specific name harak which Forsskål used in his notes, deriving it from the Arabic name for this fish in the Red Sea, Abu m'hárrak.

== Description ==
Lethrinus harak has its dorsal fin supported by 10 spines and 9 soft rays while there are 3 spines and 8 soft rays supporting the anal fin. This species is olive-green in colour, becoming paler toward the belly. It can grow to a maximum length of 50 cm (20 in) but is commonly found at 30 cm (12 in). There is a characteristic large blotch on the sides. It is dark and elliptical, located directly under the lateral line. This blotch often has a yellow edge. There are occasionally pale blue dots around each nostril and bordering the lower rim of the eyes. The caudal fin is reddish or orange in colour. The pelvic, dorsal, and pectoral fins are all pinkish to white. The mouth is somewhat protractile with thick lips.

== Distribution ==
Lethrinus harak has a wide Indo-Pacific distribution occurring along the eastern coast of Africa from the northern Red Sea south to South Africa, the islands of the western Indian Ocean, the Madives, Sri Lanka and southern India. It is then found from the Andmana Sea and Indo-Malayan Archipelago into the Pacific Ocean as far east as Samoa, north to Japan and soyth to northeastern Australia.

== Habitat ==
This fish lives in depths of up to 20 m (66 ft) in areas with sandy bottoms, coral rubble, and in mangroves, inshore seagrass areas, in lagoons and channels. It is non-migratory and forms small schools or may be solitary. This species uses seagrass beds as nursery areas.

== Biology ==
Lethrinus harak eats crustaceans, molluscs, polychaetes, echinoderms and small fishes. It is frequently found as solitary individuals but may be found in small schools. They are territorial and have small, well defined home ranges which have their size determined by intraspecific competition between fishes of similar sizes, the larger the fish the larger the home range. The thumbprint emperor is thought to be a protogynous hermaphrodite which gathers in spawning aggregations to breed, in Japan spawning has been recorded from April to November, although it spawns in all months at Guam.

== Fisheries ==
Lethrinus harak is caught mainly using seine fishing, gillnettings, traps and by handline fishing. The fish landed are mainly marketed as fresh fish. In Guam, this species is heavily fished and fishers use hook and line fishing, gillnets and spearfishing.
