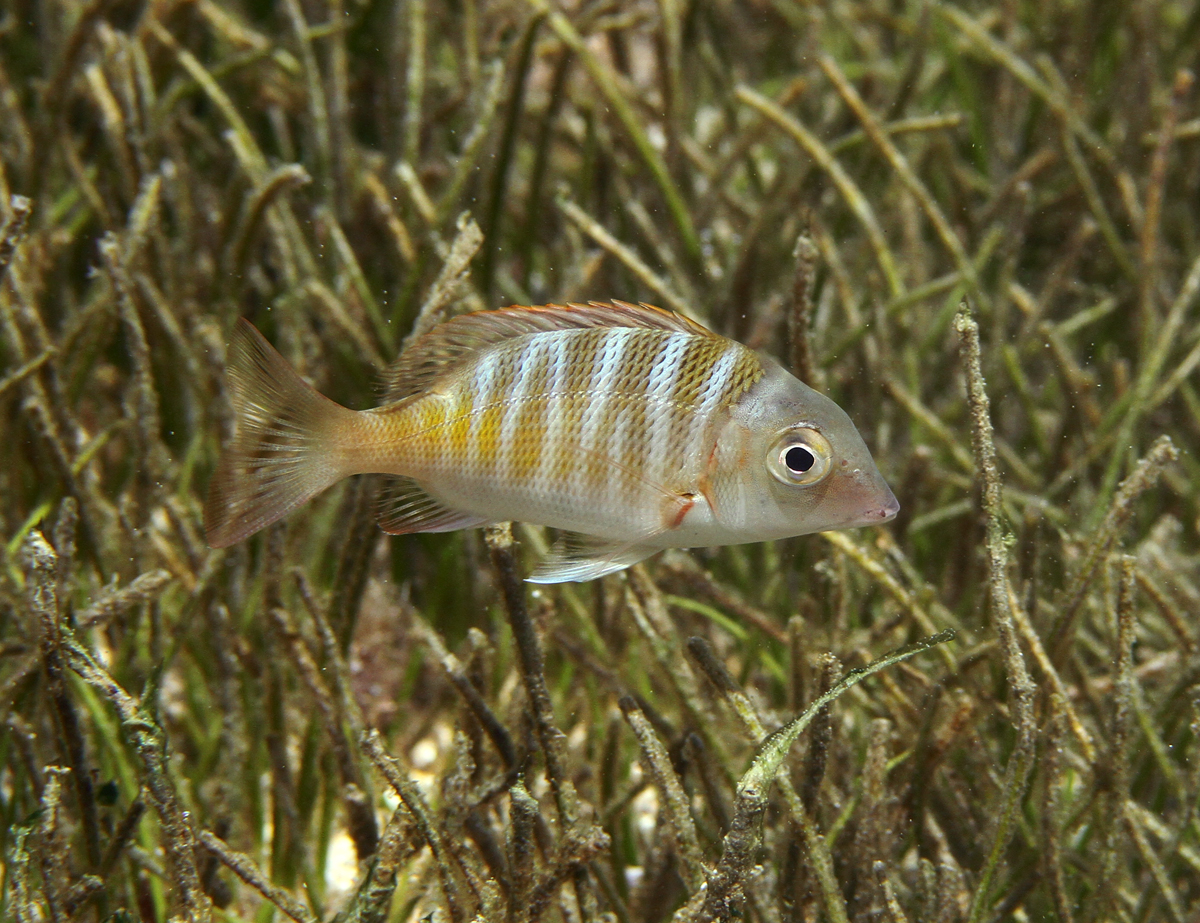
- Juvenile

Conservation status
- Endangered (IUCN 3.1)

Scientific classification
- Kingdom: Animalia
- Phylum: Chordata
- Class: Actinopterygii
- Order: Acanthuriformes
- Family: Lethrinidae
- Genus: Lethrinus
- Species: L. mahsena

Binomial name
- Lethrinus mahsena (Fabricius, 1775)

Synonyms
- Sciaena mahsena Fabricius, 1775; Lethrinus abbreviatus Valenciennes, 1830; Lethrinus caeruleus Valenciennes, 1830 Lethrinus sanguineus; J. L. B. Smith, 1955

= Lethrinus mahsena =

Species of fish

Lethrinus mahsena, common names the sky emperor, mahsena emperor, and cutthroat emperor, is a species of emperor fish. It grows to 65 cm (26 in) in length, but is commonly found at between 35 and 45 cm (14 and 18 in). This fish may be yellow to greenish-blue or olive-grey, becoming paler toward the belly. It is a non-migratory, reef-associated fish that has a high commercial value.

== Taxonomy ==
Lethrinus mahsena was first formally described as Sciaena mahsena by the Danish zoologist Johan Christian Fabricius and published in Descriptiones animalium edited by Carsten Niebuhr. Fabricius based his description on the notes of Peter Forsskål who had died while on an expedition, which Neibuhr was also a member of, to Arabia. The Type locality was given as Ras Baridi north west of Yanbu in Saudi Arabia. Some authors place the genus Lethrinus in the monotypic subfamily Lethrininae, with all the other genera of Lethrinidae placed in the Monotaxinae, however, the 5th edition of Fishes of the World does not recognise the subfamilies traditionally accepted within the family Lethrinidae as valid. The family Lethrinidae is classified by the 5th edition of Fishes of the World as belonging to the order Spariformes.

== Etymology ==
Lethrinus mahsena has the specific name mahsena which is derived from the Arabic name for this fish in Saudi Arabia, Sjöûr mehseni.

== Description ==
Lethrinus mahsena has a body which may be yellow to greenish-blue or olive-grey, becoming paler toward the belly. It commonly has nine to ten vertical bars of colour that are yellow-green or brown and a horizontal yellow stripe lattice pattern. The base of the scales may be dark or even black. At the base of the pectoral fins, there is a red bar. It grows to a maximum length of 65 cm, but is commonly found at 35 to 45 cm.

The head is purplish-grey, occasionally with a red patch on the nape. It has a moderately short snout. The lips are a strong red colour. There is a red line running from the corner of the mouth toward the tail, and in some specimens there is a line of white or yellow colouration running forward from the eye through the nostrils.

The profile of the dorsal fin is almost straight to slightly concave.

The fins are generally reddish, especially toward the tips.

== Distribution ==
Lethrinus mahsena is known to live in the Red Sea, the waters of East Africa including the waters around Madagascar. It has also been recorded southern Japan, Polynesia, the Seychelles, Cebu, Philippines, the western Indian Ocean, and the waters of Sri Lanka.

== Habitat ==
Lethrinus mahsena is a non-migratory, reef-associated fish. It lives in waters ranging from 2 to 100 metres in depth. It is found in coral reefs and the adjacent sandy bottoms. It also lives in seagrass areas.

== Diet ==
Lethrinus mahsena is known to feed on echinoderms (in particular, sea urchins), crustaceans, and other fishes. It also eats molluscs, tunicates, sponges, polychaetes.

== Human uses ==
Lethrinus mahsena is highly valued as a commercial fish and is considered to be very expensive. It is also caught by recreational fishers. It may have an undesirable 'coral' taste and odor when caught in some areas of the Indian Ocean. This fish is caught mostly using handlines, traps, and by trawling.

== Conservation status ==
Lethrinus mahsena has according to the available data undergone a 60% population decline over three generation lengths, measured over the 45 years between 1973 and 2018. It is exploited as very high levels throughout the overwhelming majority of its distribution, and it is extrapolated that the limited available data indicates its global status and the IUCN has assessed this species as Endangered.
