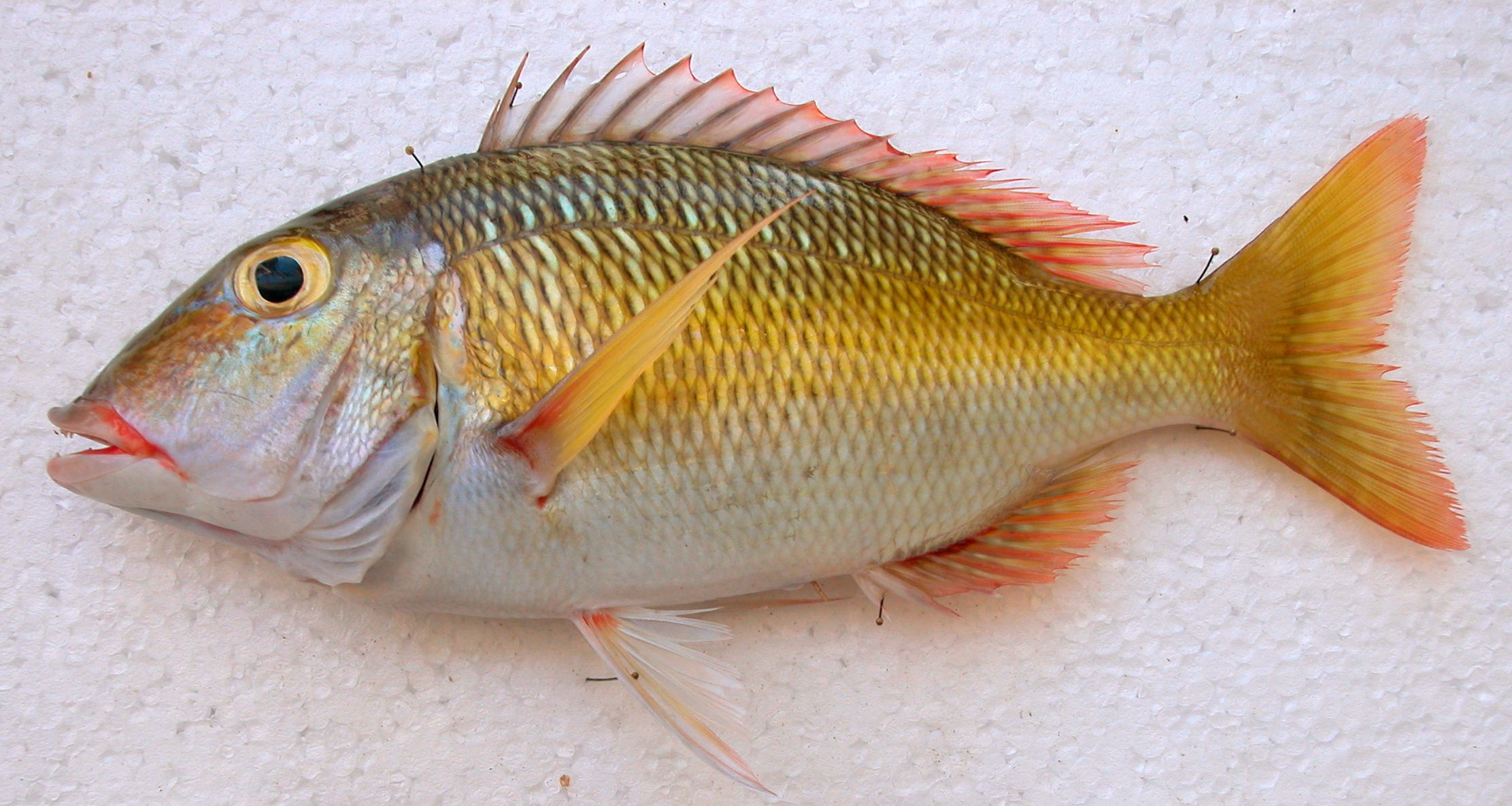

Conservation status
- Least Concern (IUCN 3.1)

Scientific classification
- Kingdom: Animalia
- Phylum: Chordata
- Class: Actinopterygii
- Division: Teleostei
- Order: Acanthuriformes
- Family: Lethrinidae
- Genus: Lethrinus
- Species: L. atkinsoni

Binomial name
- Lethrinus atkinsoni Seale, 1910

= Lethrinus atkinsoni =

Species of fish

Lethrinus atkinsoni, the Pacific yellowtail emperor,, Atkinson's emperor, reticulated emperor, tricky snapper, Tuamotu emperor, yellow morwong or yellow-tailed emperor is a species of marine ray-finned fish belonging to the family Lethrinidae, the emperor breams and emperors. This fish is found in the Western Pacific Ocean.

== Taxonomy ==
Lethrinus atkinsoni was first formally described in 1910 by the American ichthyologist Alvin Seale with its type locality given as Balabac Island in the Philippines. Some authors place the genus Lethrinus in the monotypic subfamily Lethrininae, with all the other genera of Lethrinidae placed in the Monotaxinae, however, the 5th edition of Fishes of the World does not recognise the subfamilies traditionally accepted within the family Lethrinidae as valid. The family Lethrinidae is classified by the 5th edition of Fishes of the World as belonging to the order Spariformes.

== Etymology ==
Lethrinus atkinsoni has a patronym for its specific name, Seale did not say who he was honouring with the patronym, but it is thought likely to be the illustrator William Sackston Atkinson who prepared plates for Seale.

== Description ==
Lethrinus atkinsoni has a continuous dorsal fin which is supported by 10 apines and 9 fost rays while the anal fin is supported by 3 spines and 8 soft rays. It has a moderately deep body that has a standard length of between 2.3 and 2,6 times its depth. The dorsal profile of the head is clearly convex near the eyes and the snout is short and blunt with a steep, straight profile. This species has a yellow tail and a yellow mark over the eye, it may show a wide yellow longitudinal stripe running along the midflank. The extent of yellow on the caudal peduncle and how much it extends onto the body is variable. This species has a maximum published total length of 50 cm (20 in), although 32.5 cm (12.8 in) is more typical.

== Distribution ==
This species is widespread throughout the west Pacific Ocean, and is known to live in the waters of Indonesia, the Philippines, New Caledonia, and Japan.

== Habitat ==
Lethrinus atkinsoni is a reef-associated fish, and is non-migratory. It lives in seagrass beds and over the sandy bottoms of lagoons and the outer slopes of coral reefs. It is found in depths of between 0 and 30 metres, but is most commonly found between 2 and 8 metres.

== Biology ==
Lethrinus atkinsoni has been found to be a protogynous hermaphrodite, the males develop from mature females, in some populations and in other populations they are gonochoristic, i.e separate sexes. A clearly defined spawning season was not found off Saipan, although elsewhere spawning peaks in the Spring. 50% of the fish with fork lengths between 20.6 and 21.3 cm (8.1 and 8.4 in) are sexually mature. This species is known to eat plankton, mollusks, crustaceans, and other fishes It may be solitary or found in schools.

== Human uses ==
Lethrinus atkinsoni is caught as a subsistence fish, commercially, as well as by recreation fishers. Although considered desirable as food, other species in the genus are preferred due to its smaller size. It is caught mainly using handlines, by trawling, and is captured in such nets as the shore seine and gillnet. It is marketed mostly fresh, not frozen.

== Parasites ==
As with most fish, Lethrinus atkinsoni is the host of many species of parasites. The diplectanid monogenean Calydiscoides rohdei is parasitic on the gills. The gills also harbour unidentified gnathiid isopod larvae. The digestive tract harbours several species of digeneans, including the opecoelids Macvicaria macassarensis and Neolebouria sp. and the acanthocolpid Zoogonus pagrosomi and unidentified tetraphyllid cestodes. The abdominal cavity harbours larvae of the tetrarynch cestode Pseudogilquinia pillersi. In New Caledonia, where its parasites were studied, Lethrinus atkinsoni has a total of six species of parasites.
