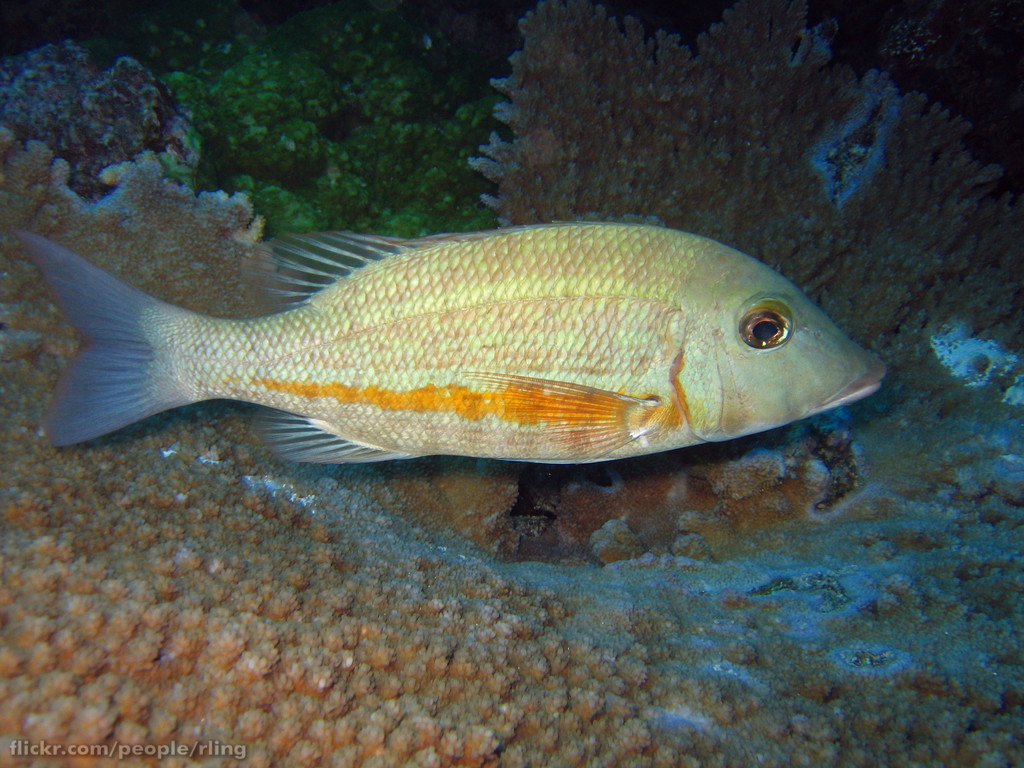
- Orange-striped Emperor (L. obsoletus)
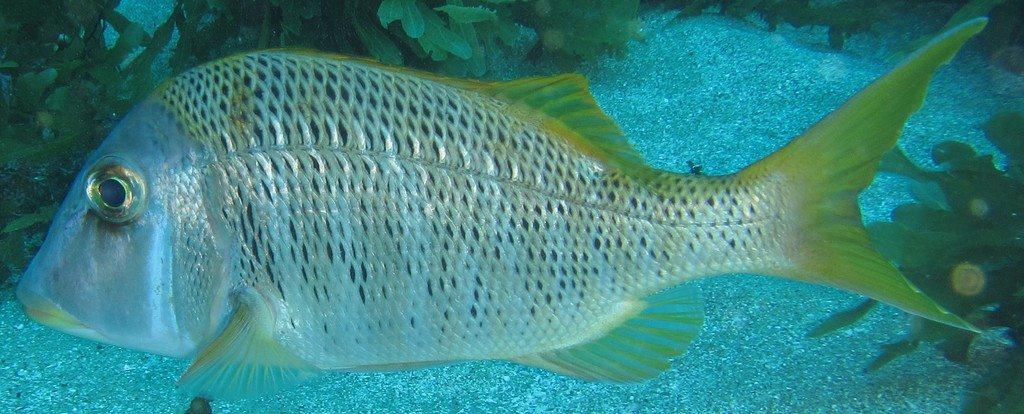
- Yellowtail emperor Lethrinus crocineus

Scientific classification
- Kingdom: Animalia
- Phylum: Chordata
- Class: Actinopterygii
- Division: Teleostei
- Order: Acanthuriformes
- Family: Lethrinidae
- Genus: Lethrinus; G. Cuvier, 1829

Type species
- Sparus choerorynchus Bloch & J. G. Schneider, 1801

Species
- 30, see text

Synonyms
- Lethrinella Fowler, 1904; Lethrinichthys D. S. Jordan & W. F. Thompson, 1912; Maina Gistel, 1848; Neolethrinus Castelnau, 1875

= Lethrinus =

Genus of fishes

Lethrinus is a genus of marine ray-finned fishes belonging to the family Lethrinidae, the emperors and emperor breams. These fishes are mostly found in the Indian and western Pacific Oceans, with a single species in the eastern Atlantic Ocean.

Lethrinus was the name in Greek for fishes in the Sparid genus Pagellus.

== Distribution and habitat ==
Lethrinus emperors are mostly found in the Indian and Western Pacific Ocean, with a single species, the Atlantic emperor (L' atlanticus) in the Eastern Atlantic Ocean. These fishes are found in coastal waters on rocky and coral reefs, sandy areas, seagrass beds and mangroves as deep as 22 m (72 ft).

== Characteristics ==
Lethrinus emperors are medium to large in size with oblong-shaped laterally compressed bodies. The dorsal profile of the head to the front of the eyes may be convex, straight or concave and the slope of the snout varies from gradual to very steep. The mouth is of moderate size and may extend as far back as the front of the orbit and it has molar-like or conical teeth in the sides of the jaws. They have a continuous dorsal fin which is supported by 10 spines and 9 soft rays while the anal fin has 3 spines and 8 soft rays. The pectoral fin has 13 fin rays and the caudal fin is moderately o deeply forked with either pointed or rounded lobes. They have scaleless cheeks, and the axils of the pectoral fins may have a dense covering of scales, a sparse covering of scales or be scaleless.

Emperors are silvery, grey, olive, greenish, bluish, tan, brown or reddish in colour, frequently marked with darker blotches or bars that can either be permanent or be shown in a reflection of the emotional state of the fish. They may have bright red markings on or near the base of the pectoral fin, on the pelvic fins or on the membranes of the anal and dorsal fins close to their bases. Further red markings may be on the margins of the operculum and preoperculum, as well as on the head. These red markings often vary within a species. The fins may be clear, pale, bluish, yellowish or reddish, frequently marked with blotches and they often have reddish margins.

The largest species is the longface emperor (L. olivaceus) with a maximum published total length of 100 cm (39 in) while the smallest species are Lethrinus mitchelli and Lethrinus variegatus both with a maximum published total length of 20 cm (7.9 in).

== Biology ==
Lethrinus emperors typically spawn in large aggregations but normally live as solitary individuals or in small aggregations. They feed on benthic invertebrates and fishes.

== Taxonomy ==
Lethrinus was first proposed as a genus in 1829 by the French zoologist Georges Cuvier. In 1912 David Starr Jordan and William Francis Thompson designated Sparus choerorynchus as the type species of the genus. Sparus choerorynchus had been described in 1801 by Marcus Elieser Bloch and Johann Gottlob Theaenus Schneider with its type locality given as Japan. Sparus choerorynchus is now considered to be a synonym of Lethrinus nebulosus (Forsskål 1775). Some authors place this genus in the monotypic subfamily Lethrininae, with all the other genera of Lethrinidae placed in the Monotaxinae, however, the 5th edition of Fishes of the World does not recognise the subfamilies traditionally accepted within the family Lethrinidae as valid. The family Lethrinidae is classified by the 5th edition of Fishes of the World as belonging to the order Spariformes.

=== Species ===
Lethrinus currently has 30 recognised species classified within it:

- Lethrinus amboinensis Bleeker, 1854 (Ambon emperor)
- Lethrinus atkinsoni Seale, 1910 (Pacific yellowtail emperor)
- Lethrinus atlanticus Valenciennes, 1830 (Atlantic emperor)
- Lethrinus borbonicus Valenciennes, 1830 (Snubnose emperor)
- Lethrinus conchyliatus (J. L. B. Smith, 1959) (Redaxil emperor)
- Lethrinus crocineus J. L. B. Smith, 1959 (Yellowtail emperor)
- Lethrinus enigmaticus J. L. B. Smith, 1959 (Blackeye emperor)
- Lethrinus erythracanthus Valenciennes, 1830 (Orange-spotted emperor)
- Lethrinus erythropterus Valenciennes, 1830 (Longfin emperor)
- Lethrinus genivittatus Valenciennes, 1830 (Longspine emperor)
- Lethrinus haematopterus Temminck & Schlegel, 1844 (Chinese emperor)
- Lethrinus harak (Fabricius, 1775) (Thumbprint emperor)
- Lethrinus laticaudis Alleyne & W. J. Macleay, 1877 (Grass emperor)
- Lethrinus lentjan (Lacépède, 1802) (Pink ear emperor)
- Lethrinus longirostris Playfair, 1867
- Lethrinus mahsena (Fabricius, 1775) (Sky emperor)
- Lethrinus microdon Valenciennes, 1830 (Smalltooth emperor)
- Lethrinus miniatus (J. R. Forster, 1801) (Trumpet emperor)
- Lethrinus mitchelli G. R. Allen, Victor & Erdmann, 2021 (Mitchell's emperor)
- Lethrinus nebulosus (Forsskål, 1775) (Spangled emperor)
- Lethrinus obsoletus (Forsskål, 1775) (Orange-striped emperor)
- Lethrinus olivaceus Valenciennes, 1830 (Longface emperor)
- Lethrinus ornatus Valenciennes, 1830 (Ornate emperor)
- Lethrinus ravus K. E. Carpenter & J. E. Randall, 2003 (Drab emperor)
- Lethrinus reticulatus Valenciennes, 1830 (Red snout emperor)
- Lethrinus rubrioperculatus Torao Sato, 1978 (Spotcheek emperor)
- Lethrinus scoparius Gilchrist & Thompson, 1908
- Lethrinus semicinctus Valenciennes, 1830 (Black blotch emperor)
- Lethrinus variegatus Valenciennes, 1830 (Slender emperor)
- Lethrinus xanthochilus Klunzinger, 1870 (Yellowlip emperor)

== Fisheries ==
Lethrinus emperors are of some importance to fisheries wherever they occur and in some nations, they are the most important genus of Lethrinidae landed by weight. Fishing methods used include handlining, longlining, traps, trawls and beach seines.

== Gallery ==
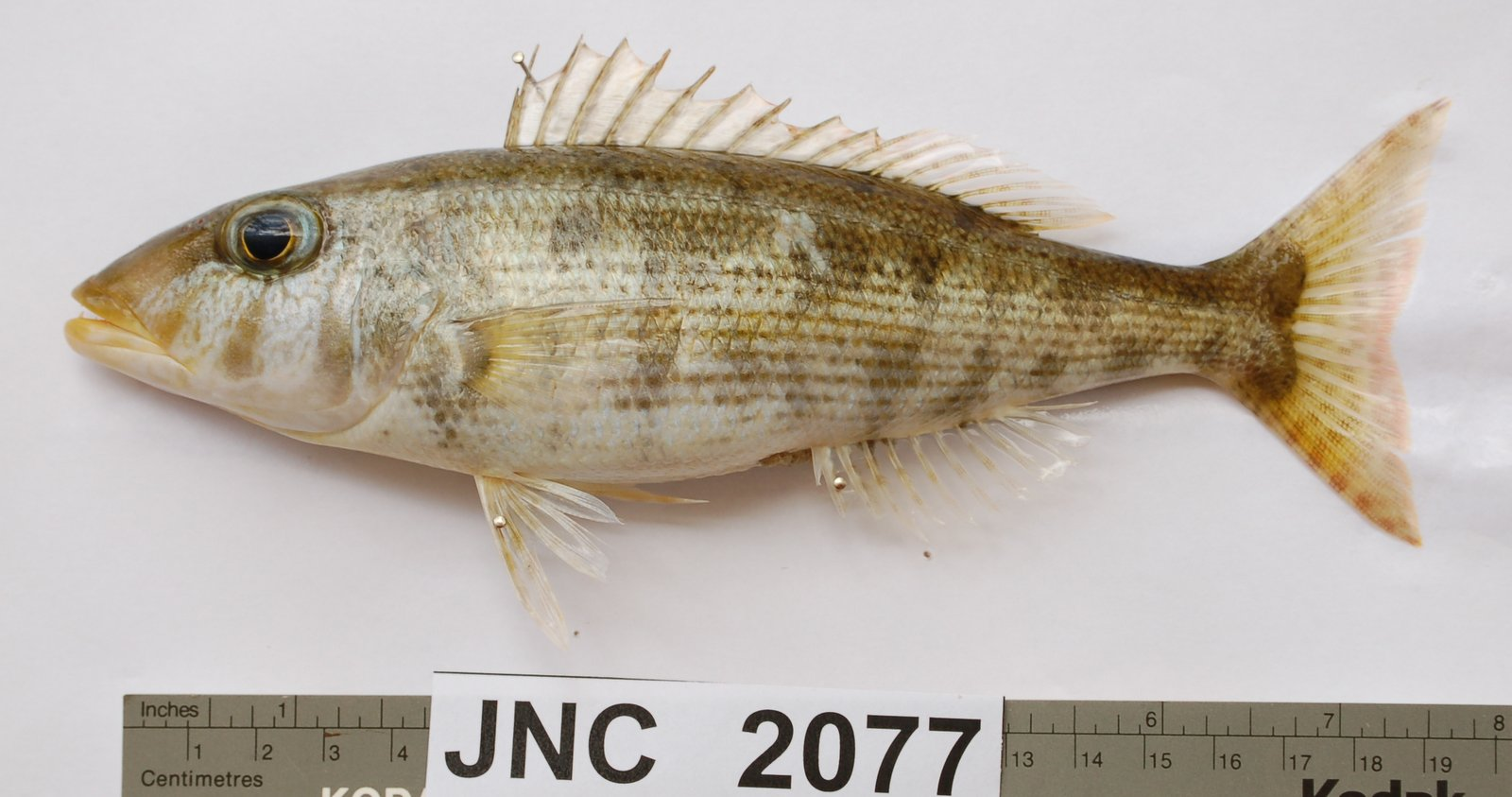
Lethrinus variegatus

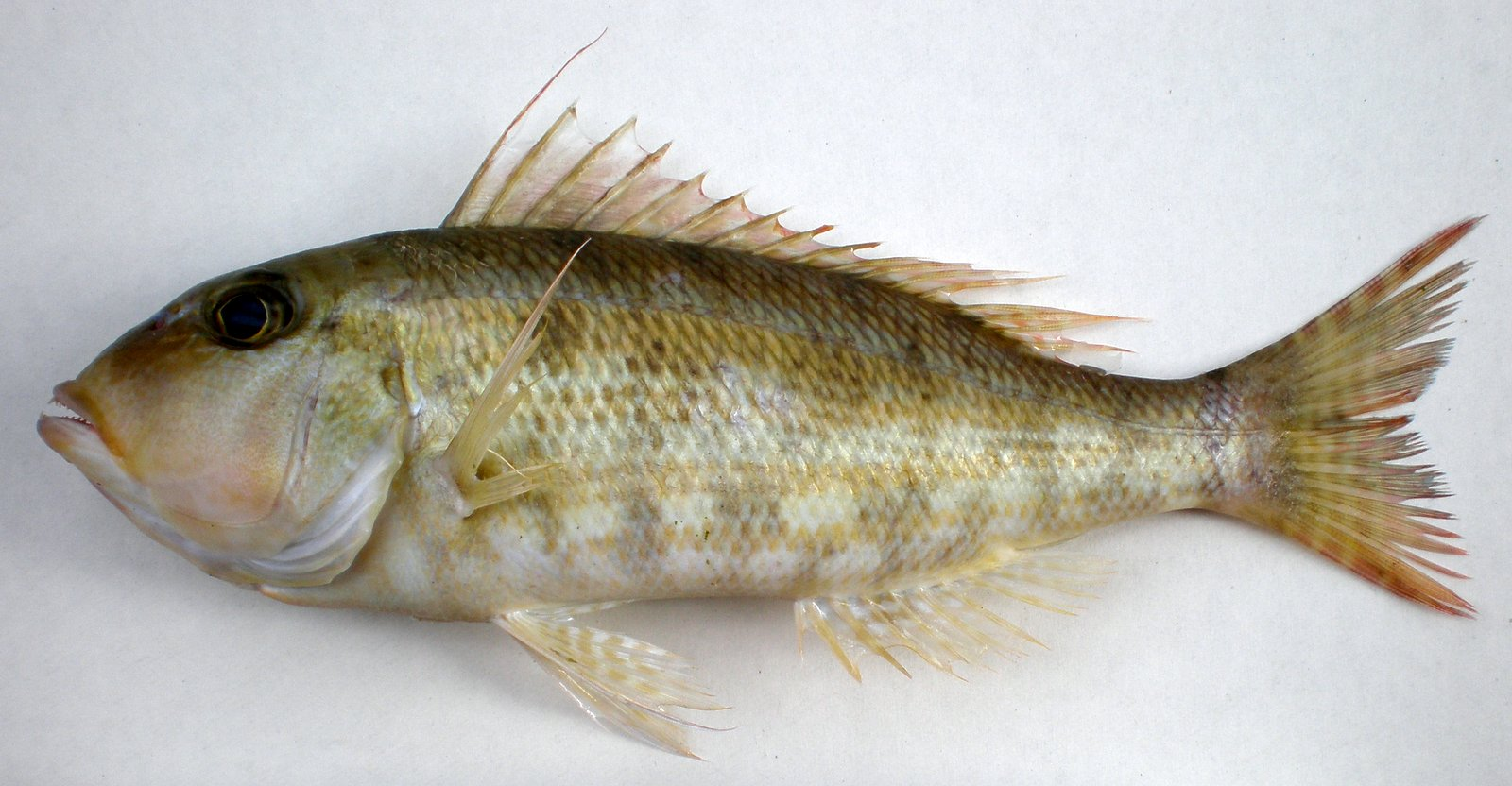
Lethrinus genivittatus

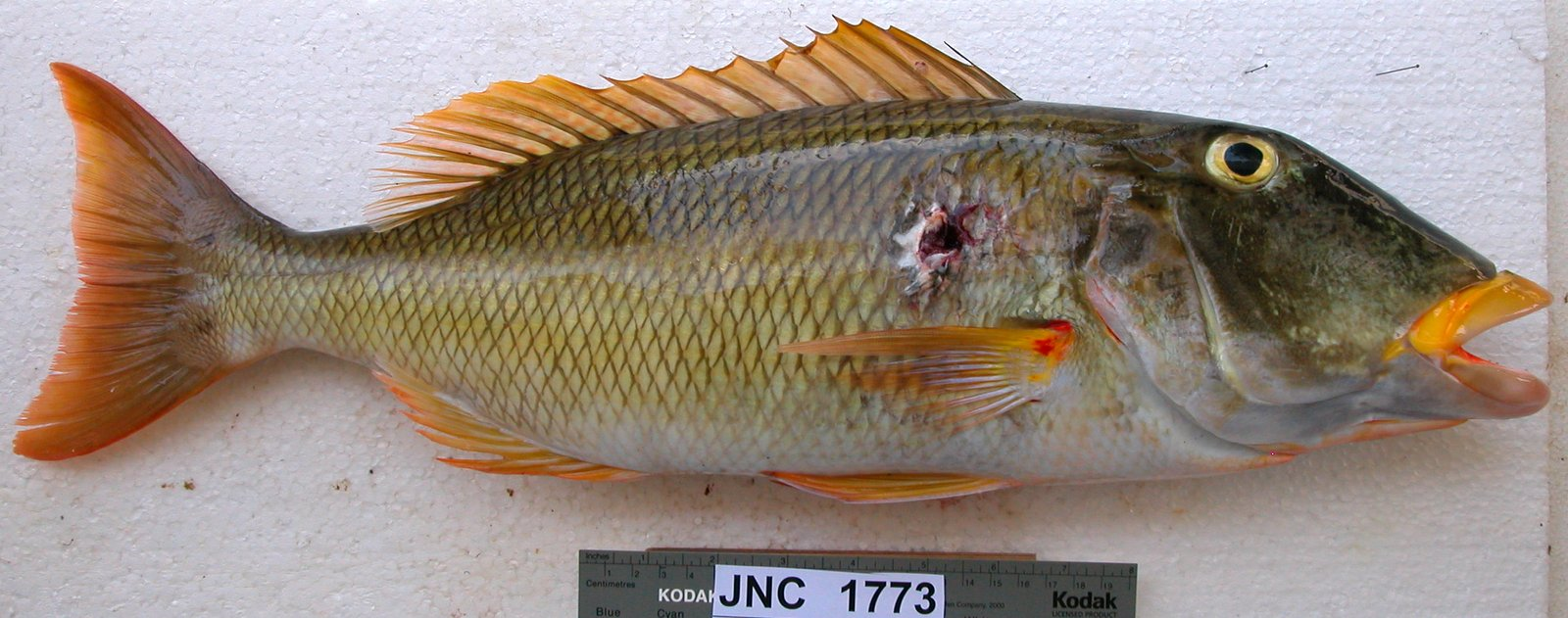
Lethrinus xanthochilus

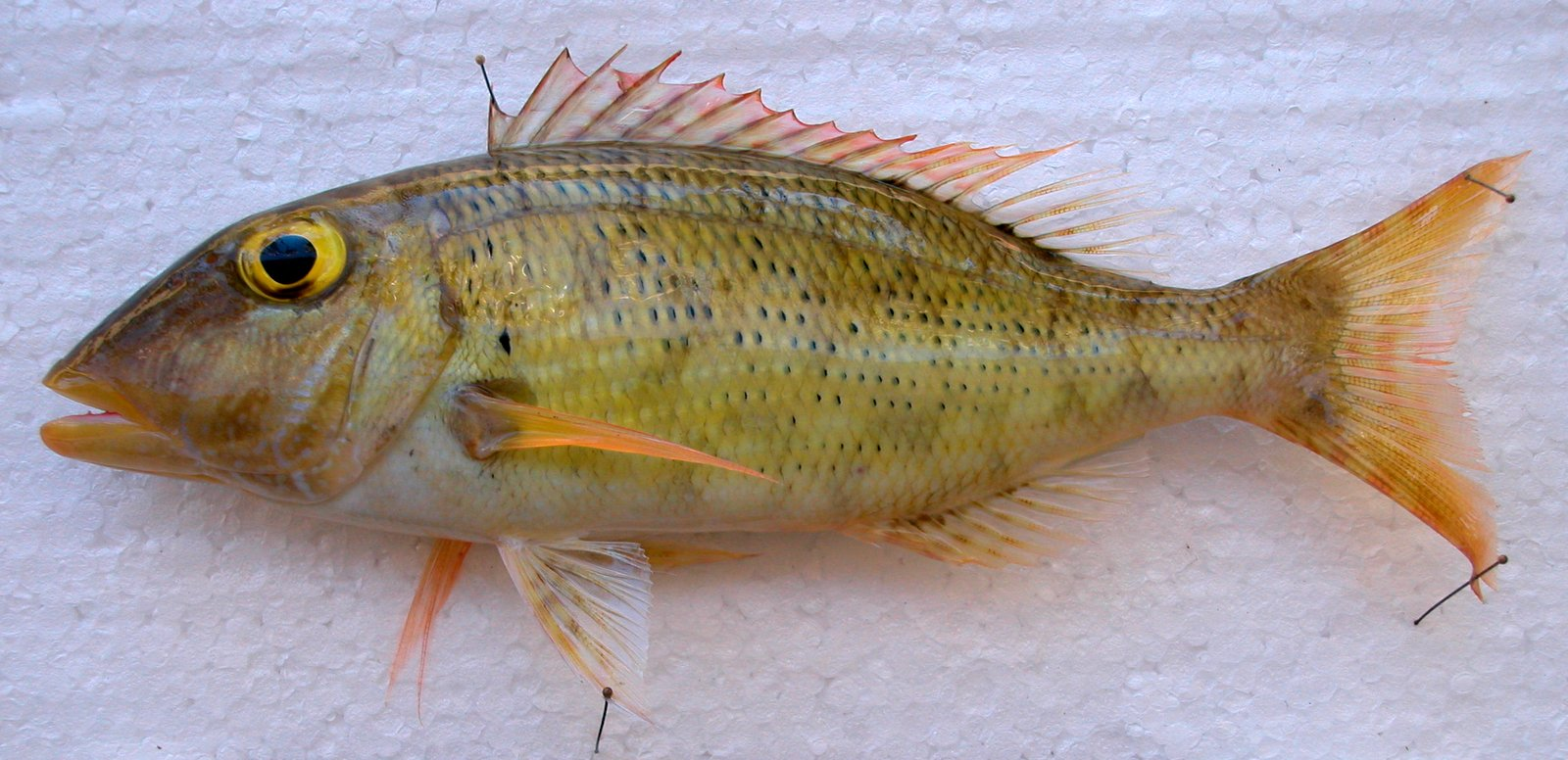
Lethrinus ravus
