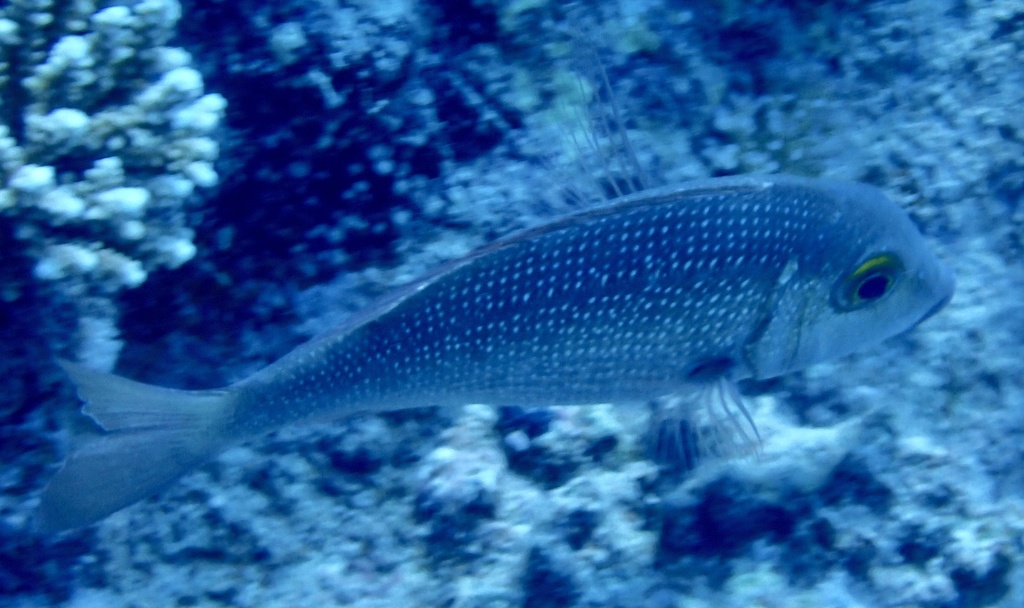

Conservation status
- Least Concern (IUCN 3.1)

Scientific classification
- Kingdom: Animalia
- Phylum: Chordata
- Class: Actinopterygii
- Order: Acanthuriformes
- Family: Lethrinidae
- Genus: Lethrinus
- Species: L. borbonicus

Binomial name
- Lethrinus borbonicus Valenciennes, 1830

Synonyms
- Lethrinus bungus Valenciennes, 1830

= Lethrinus borbonicus =

Species of fish

Lethrinus borbonicus, the snubnose emperor, is a species of marine ray-finned fish belonging to the family Lethrinidae, the emperor breams and emperors. This species is found in the Western Indian Ocean and is of some importance to commercial fisheries in that region.

== Taxonomy ==
Lethrinus borbonicus was first formally described in 1830 by the French zoologist Achille Valenciennes with its type locality given as Réunion in the Mascarene Islands. Some authors place the genus Lethrinus in the monotypic subfamily Lethrininae, with all the other genera of Lethrinidae placed in the Monotaxinae, however, the 5th edition of Fishes of the World does not recognise the subfamilies traditionally accepted within the family Lethrinidae as valid. The family Lethrinidae is classified by the 5th edition of Fishes of the World as belonging to the order Spariformes.

== Etymology ==
Lethrinus borbonicus has the specific name borbonicus, meaning "of Borbon" or "of Bourbon", an older name for Réunion being Bourbon.

== Description ==
Lethrinus borbonicus has its dorsal fin supported by 10 spines, the 4th or 5th spine being the longest, and 9 soft rays while the anal fin is supported by 3 spines and 8 soft rays. It has a moderately deep body with a depth fitting into its standard length 2.5 to 2.8 times. The space between the large eyes is normally convex and it has a moderately short, blunt snout with a straight profile. The teeth in the sides of the jaws are molar-like and the outer surface of the maxilla has a ridge. The axillaof the pectoral fin is fully scaled. The overall colour is dark grey or yellowish with a whitish ventral surface with indistinct, broken dark bars. The paired fins are white or pinkish, the dorsal and anal fins are blotched white or yellowish with a reddish margin and the caudal fin has poorly defined reddish bands. This species has a maximum published total length of 40 cm (16 in), although 25 cm (9.8 in) is more typical.

== Distribution and habitat ==
Lethribus borbonicus is found in the Western Indian Ocean. It is distributed along the coast of eastern Africa from the gulf of Suez and Gulf of Aqaba south through the Red Sea and south to Sodwana Bay in South Africa. It is found around Madagascar, the Comoro Islands, the Seychelles, the Mascarenes and around the Arabian Peninsula and the Persian Gulf as far east as Pakistan. This species is found at depths between 1 and 40 m (3 ft 3 in and 131 ft 3 in) in areas of sandy substrates, in the vicinity of reefs, during the day when they may also gather in small groups. At night they are solitary and hunt over reef flats and slopes

== Biology ==
Lethrinus borbonicus feeds on echinoderms, molluscs and crustaceans. In the southern Persian Gul this species spawns between March and June and the species has been found to have a fast growth and a short lifespan.

== Fisheries ==
Lethrinus borbonicus is of minor importance to commercial fisheries over all its range, however, it is a commercially important target species in the Persian Gulf. It is caught using fish traps, as bycatch in trawl fisheries and with hand lines.
