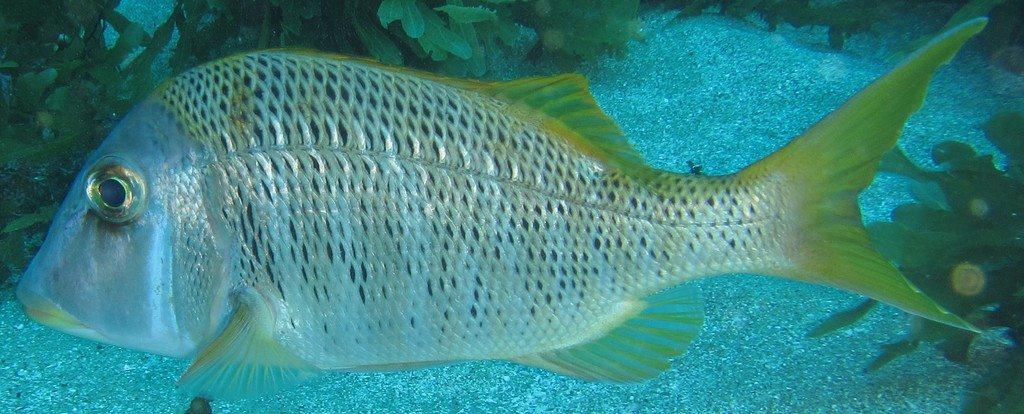

Conservation status
- Least Concern (IUCN 3.1)

Scientific classification
- Kingdom: Animalia
- Phylum: Chordata
- Class: Actinopterygii
- Order: Acanthuriformes
- Family: Lethrinidae
- Genus: Lethrinus
- Species: L. crocineus

Binomial name
- Lethrinus crocineus J. L. B. Smith, 1959

= Lethrinus crocineus =

Species of marine fish

Lethrinus crocineus, the yellowtail emperor, is a species of marine ray-finned fish belonging to the family Lethrinidae, the emperors and emperor breams. This fish is found in the Indian Ocean.

== Taxonomy ==
Lethrinus crocineus was first formally described in 1959 by the South African ichthyologist James Leonard Brierley Smith given as Pinda in Mozambique. Some authors place the genus Lethrinus in the monotypic subfamily Lethrininae, with all the other genera of Lethrinidae placed in the Monotaxinae, however, the 5th edition of Fishes of the World does not recognise the subfamilies traditionally accepted within the family Lethrinidae as valid. The family Lethrinidae is classified by the 5th edition of Fishes of the World as belonging to the order Spariformes.

== Etymology ==
Lethrinus crocineus has the specific name crocineus which means "saffron", an allusion Smith did not explain, although it may be a reference to the mostly yellowish colour of living specimens.

== Description ==
Lethrinus crocineus has its dorsal fin supported by 10 spines and 9 soft rays while there are 3 spines and 8 soft rays supporting the anal fin. It has a rather deep body with the body's depth fitting 2.3 to 2.4 times into its standard length. The head has a straight profile and a short snout. It has rounded teeth in its jaws, although these are more molariform laterally. The inner surface of the axilla of the pectoral fin has a dense covering of scales. It has a grey or brownish head, the body is grey or tan with black bases to the scales. The margins of the operculum and the dorsal and anal fins are reddish. This species has a maximum published total length of 60 cm (24 in).

== Distribution and habitat ==
Lethrinus crocineus is found in the Indian Ocean where it has a rather disjunct distribution. It occurs along the eastern coast of Africa between Kenya and South Africa, in the Comoro Islands, off Madagascar, the Seychelles, the Mascarene Islands, Sri Lanka and in the Andaman Sea. It is found on reefs and in sandy areas close to reefs as depths down to around 150 m (490 ft).

== Biology ==
Lethrinus crocineus is a solitary fish but does gather in aggregations to spawn in April and May. This fish hints its prey at night.

== Fisheries ==
Lethrinus crocineus is fished for using handlines and is sold as fresh fish. It is not a common fish and os not threatened by fisheries.
