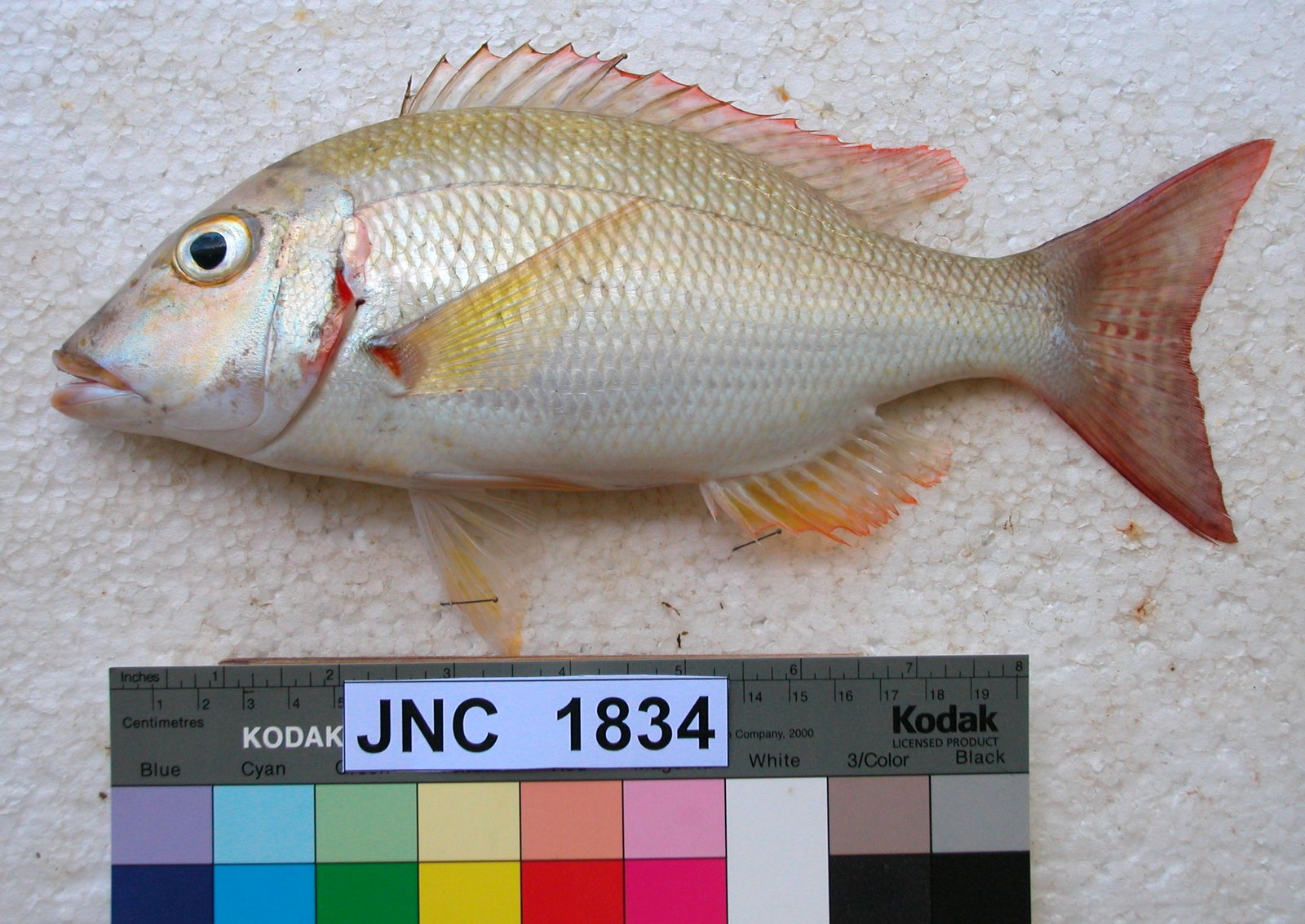

Conservation status
- Least Concern (IUCN 3.1)

Scientific classification
- Kingdom: Animalia
- Phylum: Chordata
- Class: Actinopterygii
- Division: Teleostei
- Order: Acanthuriformes
- Family: Lethrinidae
- Genus: Lethrinus
- Species: L. lentjan

Binomial name
- Lethrinus lentjan (Lacépède, 1802)

Synonyms
- Bodianus lentjan Lacépède, 1802; Lethrinus argenteus Valenciennes, 1830; Lethrinus croceopterus Valenciennes, 1830; Lethrinus cinereus Valenciennes, 1830; Lethrinus mahsenoides Valenciennes, 1830; Lethrinus opercularis Valenciennes, 1830; Lethrinus flavescens Valenciennes, 1830; Lethrinus geniguttatus Valenciennes, 1830; Lethrinus virescens Valenciennes, 1830; Pentapodus nubilus Cantor, 1849; Lethrinus cocosensis Bleeker, 1854; Lethrinus glyphodon Günther, 1859; Lethrinus punctulatus Macleay, 1878; Lethrinus fusciceps Macleay, 1878

= Lethrinus lentjan =

Species of fish

Lethrinus lentjan, the pink ear emperor, redspot emperor, purple ear emperor or purple-headed emperor, is a species of marine ray-finned fish belonging to the family Lethrinidae, the emperors and emperor breams. This fish is found in the Indo-Pacific region.

== Taxonomy ==
Lethrinus lentjan was first formally described as Bodianus lentjan by the French naturalist Bernard Germain de Lacépède with no type locality given but it is thought to be Java. Some authors place the genus Lethrinus in the monotypic subfamily Lethrininae, with all the other genera of Lethrinidae placed in the Monotaxinae, however, the 5th edition of Fishes of the World does not recognise the subfamilies traditionally accepted within the family Lethrinidae as valid. The family Lethrinidae is classified by the 5th edition of Fishes of the World as belonging to the order Spariformes.

== Etymology ==
Lethrinus lentjan has the specific name lentjan, this name was not explained by Lacépède but is thought to be a local name for this fish in Indonesia.

== Description ==
This is a large species, growing to approximately 50 cm in length. however specimens in the intertidal zone may be around 15 cm. The body is olive-green, becoming paler toward the belly.

The scales are large and in a diamond pattern. There is a blood-red colouration around the margin of gill covers, and often at the base of the pectoral fins as well. The dorsal fin is white has a reddish margin. Both the caudal and dorsal fins have orange mottling. The pectoral fin may be pale orange, whitish or yellowish. It has thick, fleshy lips, and a somewhat protractiile snout.

== Distribution ==
Lethrinus lentjan is widespread in the Indo-West Pacific and other waters. It is known to live in the Red Sea and Persian Gulf, in Australia on the Great Barrier Reef, and the northern half of Australia., in the lagoon around New Caledonia, along the east coast of Africa, and in the waters of Taiwan.

== Habitat ==
Lethrinus lentjan lives mainly in coastal areas. It occurs in coral reefs and also inhabits areas with sandy bottoms and grassy seabeds, in mangrove swamps, and deep lagoons. Juveniles are more commonly associated with shallow areas, often in loose aggregations with adult specimens. Adults are usually solitary and may be found in waters up to 84 metres in depth.

== Diet ==
Lethrinus lentjan is a carnivore and eats mostly crustaceans and mollusks such as snails. It also feeds on echinoderms, polychaetes, bivalves, worms, and various fishes.

== Human uses ==
Lethrinus lentjan is commercially and recreationally fished for human consumption.

== Parasites ==
Lethrinus lentjan, like most fish, is the host of several species of parasites. Monogeneans parasitic on the gills include the diplectanid Calydiscoides difficilis and Calydiscoides duplicostatus, and an ancyrocephalid. The gills also harbour unidentified gnathiid isopod larvae. The digestive tract harbours several species of digeneans, including the opecoelid Orthodena tropica and unidentified anisakid nematode larvae. In New Caledonia, where its parasites were studied, Lethrinus lentjan has a total of seven species of parasites.
