= Lethrinus scoparius =

Scientific classification
- Kingdom: Animalia
- Phylum: Chordata
- Class: Actinopterygii
- Order: Acanthuriformes
- Family: Lethrinidae
- Genus: Lethrinus
- Species: L. scoparius

Binomial name
- Lethrinus scoparius Gilchrist & Thompson, 1908

Species of fish

Lethrinus scoparius is a species of marine ray-finned fish belonging to the family Lethrinidae, the emperors and emperor breams. This species is found in the southwestern Indian Ocean. L. scoparius was previously considered to be a junior synonyms of L. nebulosus.
