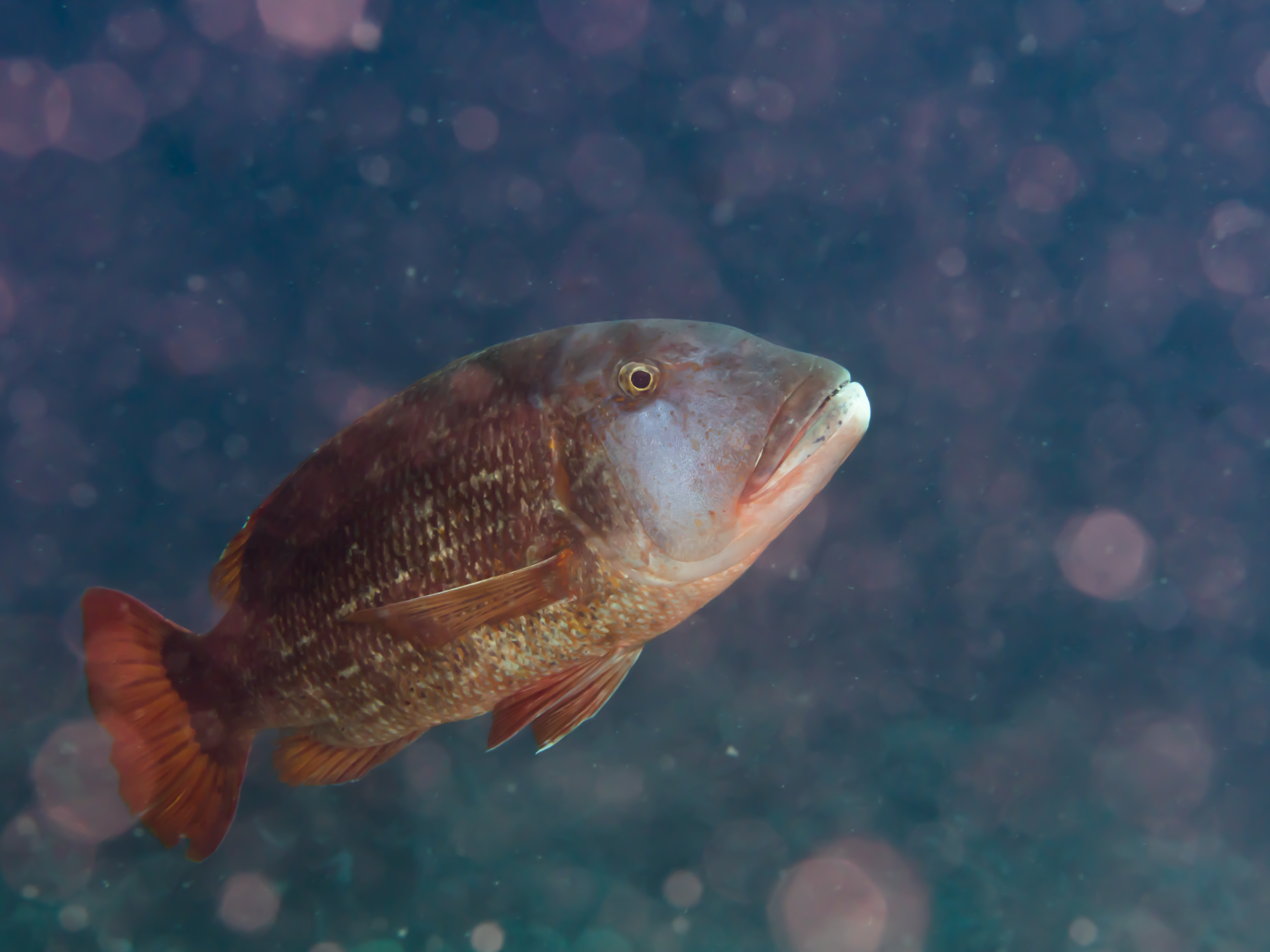

Conservation status
- Least Concern (IUCN 3.1)

Scientific classification
- Kingdom: Animalia
- Phylum: Chordata
- Class: Actinopterygii
- Division: Teleostei
- Order: Acanthuriformes
- Family: Lethrinidae
- Genus: Lethrinus
- Species: L. erythracanthus

Binomial name
- Lethrinus erythracanthus Valenciennes, 1830

Synonyms
- Lethrinus cinnabarinus Richardson, 1843; Lethrinus kallopterus Bleeker, 1856

= Lethrinus erythracanthus =

Species of fish

Lethrinus erythracanthus, the orange-spotted emperor, orangefin emperor, and yellow-spotted emperor, is a species of marine ray-finned fish belonging to the family Lethrinidae. This species is found in the Indo-Pacific region.

== Taxonomy ==
Lethrinus erythracanthus was first formally described in 1830 by the French zoologist Achille Valenciennes with its type locality given as Luganor in the Caroline Islands. Some authors place the genus Lethrinus in the monotypic subfamily Lethrininae, with all the other genera of Lethrinidae placed in the Monotaxinae, however, the 5th edition of Fishes of the World does not recognise the subfamilies traditionally accepted within the family Lethrinidae as valid. The family Lethrinidae is classified by the 5th edition of Fishes of the World as belonging to the order Spariformes.

== Etymology ==
Lethrinus erythracanthus has the specific name erythracanthus which combines erythros, meaning "red", with acanthus, which means "thorn", Valenciennes described this species as having beautiful red fin rays.

== Description ==
Lethrinus erythracanthus is the largest of the 27 species in the genus Lethrinus. The body is dark brown-grey in colour with scattered golden-orange spots. It has a short snout. Present on the body are small, light and dark stripes that appear indistinct. These are occasionally present on the lower sides. The head of this species is a brown or grey colour with large eyes that help it feed in the dark. Smaller adults commonly have small, yellow-orange spots on each cheek.

=== Fins ===
This species has a distinctive bright orange caudal fin. Younger species have a slightly forked caudal fin that is often bright orange. This fin becomes rounded when the fish matures. In adults, the dorsal and anal fins are rounded and usually bluish and orange mottling or blue spots. The pelvic and pectoral fins are orangish to white in colour. In specimens from the Indian Ocean, the fins are a straw yellow colour instead of orange. The fins have strong spines.

== Distribution ==
This species is found in the waters of East Africa, east to the Tuamotus archipelago and the Society Islands. It is recorded from the Ryukyu Islands in the north, down to the northeastern waters of Australia as well as New Caledonia.

== Habitat ==
Lethrinus erythracanthus is found at depths of between 15 and 120 metres. It is a reef-associated fish and is non-migratory. It lives in channels, the slopes of outer reefs and the soft bottoms that are adjacent. It is also found in deep lagoons. In the day, it may be solitary in or around caves or by ledges.

== Diet ==
This fish is carnivorous and is a bottom-feeder. It is known to eat such animals as starfishes, mollusks, crinoids, echinoids, echinoderms, and crustaceans.

== Human uses ==
This fish is considered to be high-value as food and is caught by sport fishers. When caught in some locations, it may be ciguatoxic and should not be consumed.
