= Lethrinus atlanticus =

Conservation status
- Least Concern (IUCN 3.1)

Scientific classification
- Kingdom: Animalia
- Phylum: Chordata
- Class: Actinopterygii
- Division: Teleostei
- Order: Acanthuriformes
- Family: Lethrinidae
- Genus: Lethrinus
- Species: L. atlanticus

Binomial name
- Lethrinus atlanticus Valenciennes, 1830

Species of fish

Lethrinus atlanticus, the Atlantic emperor, is a species of marine ray-finned fish belonging to the family Lethrinidae, the emperors and emperor breams. This species is found in the eastern Atlantic Ocean off the coast of western Africa.

== Taxonomy ==
Lethrinus atlanticus was first formally described in 1830 by the French zoologist Achille Valenciennes with its type locality given as Santiago, Cape Verde and Porto Praya in Cape Verde. Some authors place the genus Lethrinus in the monotypic subfamily Lethrininae, with all the other genera of Lethrinidae placed in the Monotaxinae, however, the 5th edition of Fishes of the World does not recognise the subfamilies traditionally accepted within the family Lethrinidae as valid. The family Lethrinidae is classified by the 5th edition of Fishes of the World as belonging to the order Spariformes.

== Description ==
Lethrinus atlanticus has a dorsal fin which is supported by 10 spines and 9 soft rays while anal fin contains 3 spines and 8 soft rays. It has a body with a standard length that is between 2.5 and 2.8 times its depth. The dorsal profile of the head is almost straight or weakly convex near the eye. The snout is pointed with a rather steep, straight profile. All the teeth in the sides of the jaws are conical. There are no scales on the cheeks. The pectoral fin has no scales in its axil. The overall colour is olive green or brown and pink, the cheek has a lattice pattern underneath the eye. This species has a maximum published total length of 50 cm (20 in), although 30 cm (12 in) is more typical.

== Distribution and habitat ==
Lethrinus atlanticus is found in the Eastern Atlantic Ocean where it occurs in Cape Verde and along the western coast of Africa between Senegal and Angola, including São Tomé and Príncipe. This species is found in shallow coastal waters and estuaries.

== Biology ==
Lethrinus atlanticus feeds on benthic invertebrates but is otherwise little known.

== Fisheries ==
Lethrinus atlanticus is a target species for commercial fisheries in the central eastern Atlantic by Bottom trawling, fish traps, purse seines and hook-and-lines. The catch is marketed fresh or preserved by Salting (food) or smoked fish.
