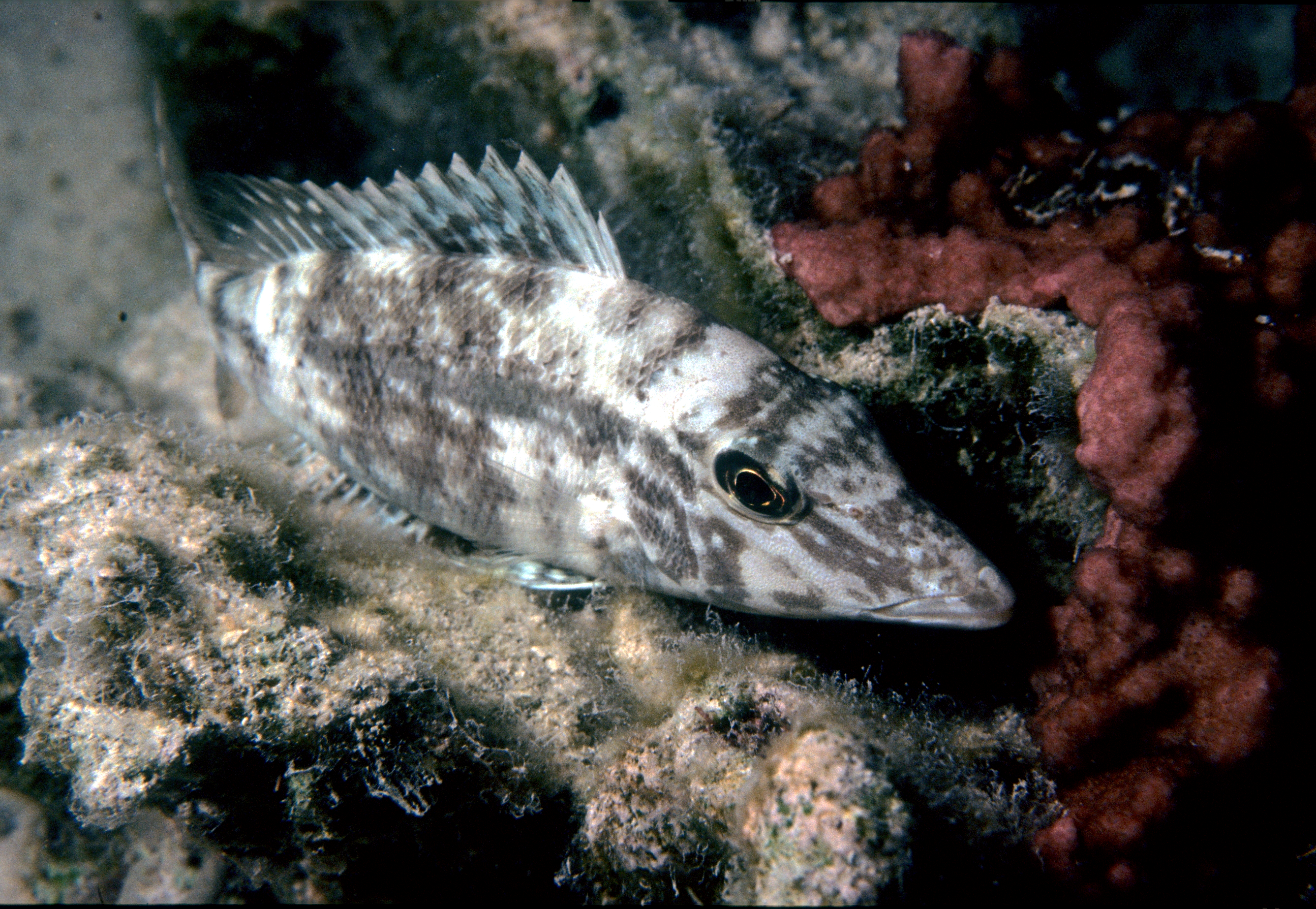

Conservation status
- Least Concern (IUCN 3.1)

Scientific classification
- Kingdom: Animalia
- Phylum: Chordata
- Class: Actinopterygii
- Order: Acanthuriformes
- Family: Lethrinidae
- Genus: Lethrinus
- Species: L. microdon

Binomial name
- Lethrinus microdon Valenciennes, 1830

Synonyms
- Lethrinella microdon Valenciennes, 1830); Lethrinus acutus Klunzinger, 1884; Lethrinus elongatus Valenciennes, 1830

= Lethrinus microdon =

Species of fish

Lethrinus microdon, the smalltooth emperor, longface emperor or pigface bream, is a species of marine ray-finned fish belonging to the family Lethrinidae, the emperors and emperor breams. This species has a widespread distribution in the Indo-Pacific.

== Taxonomy ==
Lethrinus microdon was first formally described as Lethrinella microdon in 1830 by the French zoologist Achille Valenciennes with its type locality given as northeastern Pulau Buru in the Maluku Islands of Indonesia. Some authors place the genus Lethrinus in the monotypic subfamily Lethrininae, with all the other genera of Lethrinidae placed in the Monotaxinae, however, the 5th edition of Fishes of the World does not recognise the subfamilies traditionally accepted within the family Lethrinidae as valid. The family Lethrinidae is classified by the 5th edition of Fishes of the World as belonging to the order Spariformes.

== Etymology ==
Lethrinus microdon has the specific name microdon which means "small toothed", Valenciennes described this species as having "remarkably small and pointed" teeth.

== Description ==
Lethrinus microdon is bluish-grey or brown in colour with pale or somewhat orange fins, and has a moderately long snout. It commonly has dark, scattered, irregular blotches on its sides. Some specimens have three streaks of dark colouration radiating away from the eye toward the snout. It is a relatively elongate fish and grows to a maximum length of approximately 70 cm, but is commonly recorded at between 30 and 50 cm in length.

== Distribution ==
Lethrinus microdon is a widespread species. It has been recorded in the Red Sea, Persian Gulf, Arabian Sea, from East Africa to Sri Lanka, in the Ryukyu Islands as well as Papua New Guinea.

== Habitat ==
Lethrinus microdon is non-migratory and is found over sandy bottoms near reefs. It forms small schools, occasionally with Lethrinus olivaceus, and has a maximum depth range of approximately 10 to 80 metres.

== Diet ==
Lethrinus microdon feeds in the day and at night, and is known to feed mainly on other fishes, cephalopods, crustaceans, and polychaetes.

== Human uses ==
Lethrinus microdon is fished commercially and is considered to be an excellent food fish. It is usually marketed fresh and not frozen. It is known to be caught using gill nets, trawls, handlines, and fish traps.
