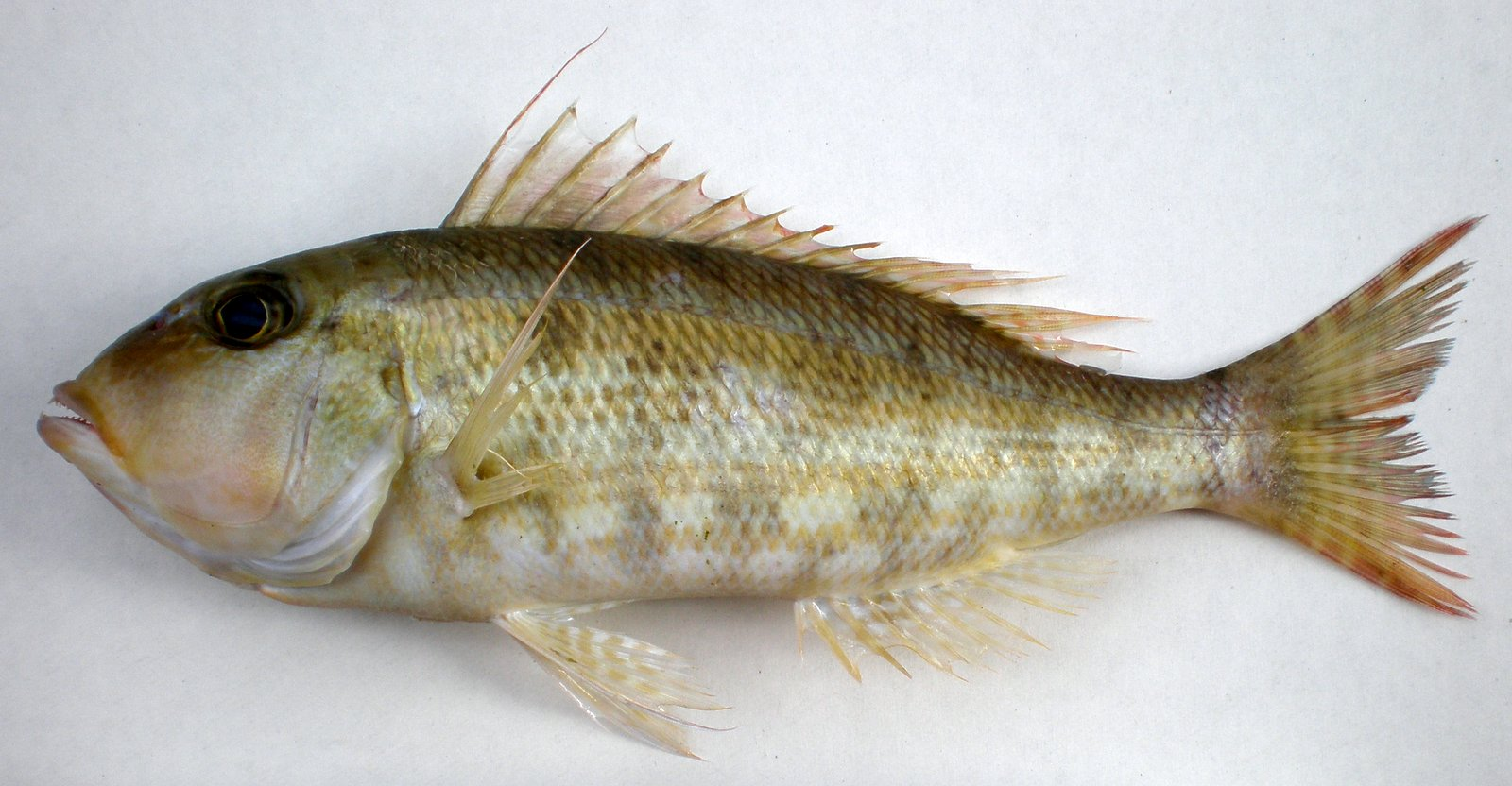

Conservation status
- Least Concern (IUCN 3.1)

Scientific classification
- Kingdom: Animalia
- Phylum: Chordata
- Class: Actinopterygii
- Order: Acanthuriformes
- Family: Lethrinidae
- Genus: Lethrinus
- Species: L. genivittatus

Binomial name
- Lethrinus genivittatus Valenciennes, 1830

Synonyms
- Lethrinus nematacanthus Bleeker, 1854

= Lethrinus genivittatus =

Species of fish

Lethrinus genivittatus, the longspine emperor, threadfin emperor, lance emperor or lancer, is a species of fish in the genus Lethrinus, and family Lethrinidae. It was first described by Achille Valenciennes in 1830. The IUCN classifies it as being of least concern. It lives in marine and brackish water and is native to the Indo-West Pacific.
