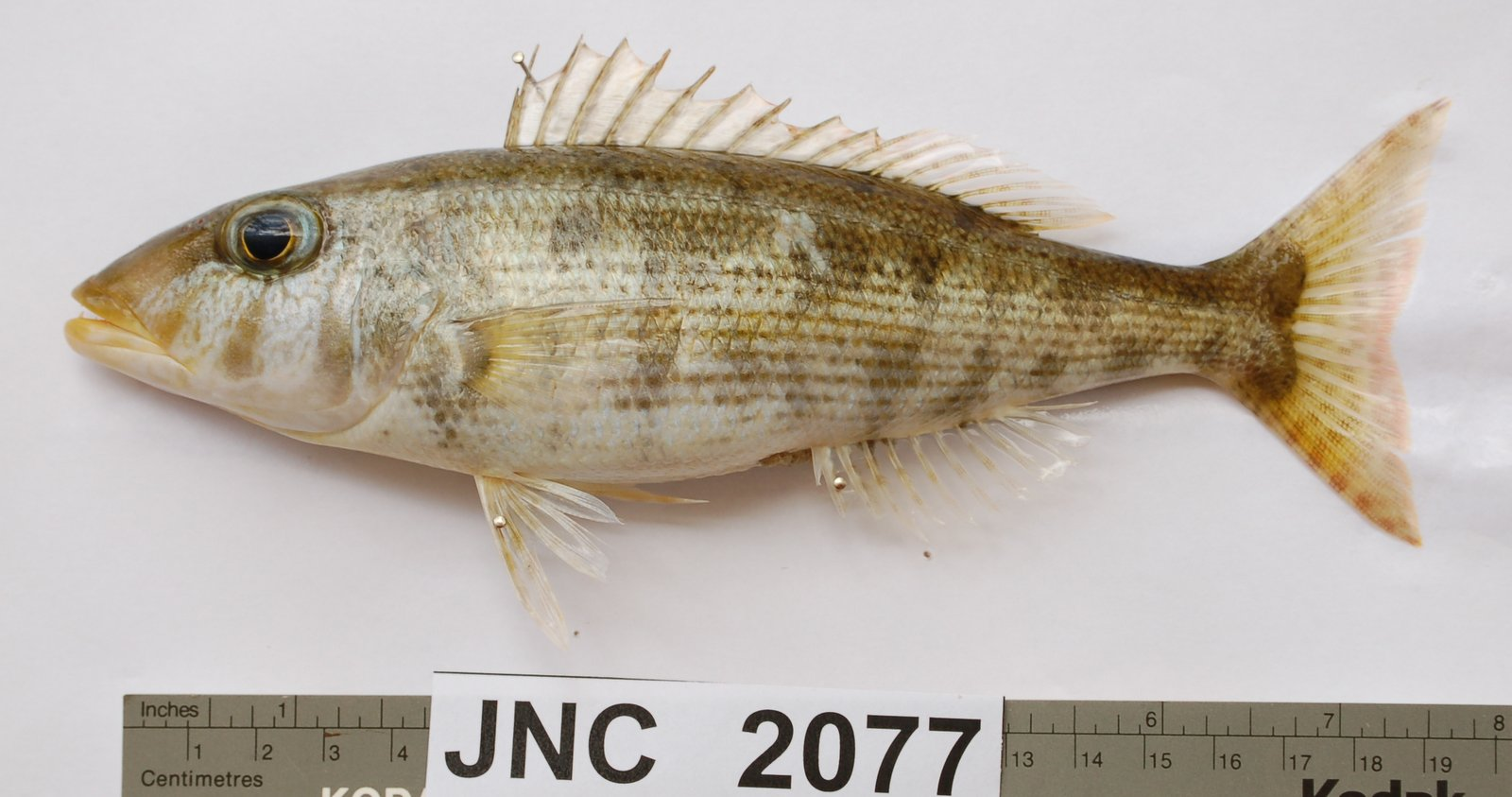

Conservation status
- Least Concern (IUCN 3.1)

Scientific classification
- Kingdom: Animalia
- Phylum: Chordata
- Class: Actinopterygii
- Order: Acanthuriformes
- Family: Lethrinidae
- Genus: Lethrinus
- Species: L. variegatus

Binomial name
- Lethrinus variegatus Valenciennes, 1830

Synonyms
- Lethrinella variegata (Valenciennes, 1830); Lethrinella variegatus (Valenciennes, 1830); Lethrinus latifrons Rüppell, 1838

= Lethrinus variegatus =

Species of marine fish

Lethrinus variegatus, the slender emperor or variegated emperor, is a species of marine ray-finned fish belonging to the family Lethrinidae, the emperors and emperor breams. This fish has a wide Indo-Pacific distribution.

== Taxonomy ==
Lethrinus variegatus was first formally described in 1830 by the French zoologist Achille Valenciennes with its type locality given as Massawa in Eritrea. Some authors place the genus Lethrinus in the monotypic subfamily Lethrininae, with all the other genera of Lethrinidae placed in the Monotaxinae, however, the 5th edition of Fishes of the World does not recognise the subfamilies traditionally accepted within the family Lethrinidae as valid. The family Lethrinidae is classified by the 5th edition of Fishes of the World as belonging to the order Spariformes.

== Etymology ==
Lethrinus variegatus has the specific name vatiegatus which means "variegated", Valenciennes did not explains this but it may be an allusion to the varied pattern of black spots on the flanks.

== Description ==
Lethrinus variegatus has 10 spines and 9 soft rays supporting its dorsal fin while its anal fin is supported by 2 spines and 8 soft rays. The depth of its body its into its standard length 3.9 times. The area between the eyes is either flat or slightly humped. There are no scales on the inner surface of the axilla of the pectoral fins. The overall colour of the body is brown and grey, paler on the lower body, with a scattering of irregular dark spots. There are frequently two dark bars underneath the eye, one extending to the lower margin of the preoperculum and the other to the corner of the mouth. A further dark band runs across the space between the eyes. The fins, other than the caudal fin which has light and dark stripes, are pale or translucent. This species has a maximum published total length of 20 cm (7.9 in).

== Distribution and habitat ==
Lethrinus variegatus has a wide distribution in the Indian and Western Pacific Oceans. It is found along the eastern coast of Africa from the Gulf of Suez and Gulf of Aqaba south to Sodwana Bay in South Africa, in the Comoro Islands, Seychelles, Madagascar, the Chagos Islands, southern India and Sri Lanka, east around the Malay Archipelago into the Pacific Ocean where it is found as far north as the Ryukyu Islands, south to Australia and New Caledonia and east to Tonga. The slender emperors lives in sandy and weedy areas close to coral reefs, singly or in small schools. The juveniles can be very numerous in shallow weedy areas.

== Biology ==
Lethrinus variegatus uses its camouflage to hide within its habitat. It preys on small benthic invertebrates. The variegated emperor is a protogynous hermaphrodite.
