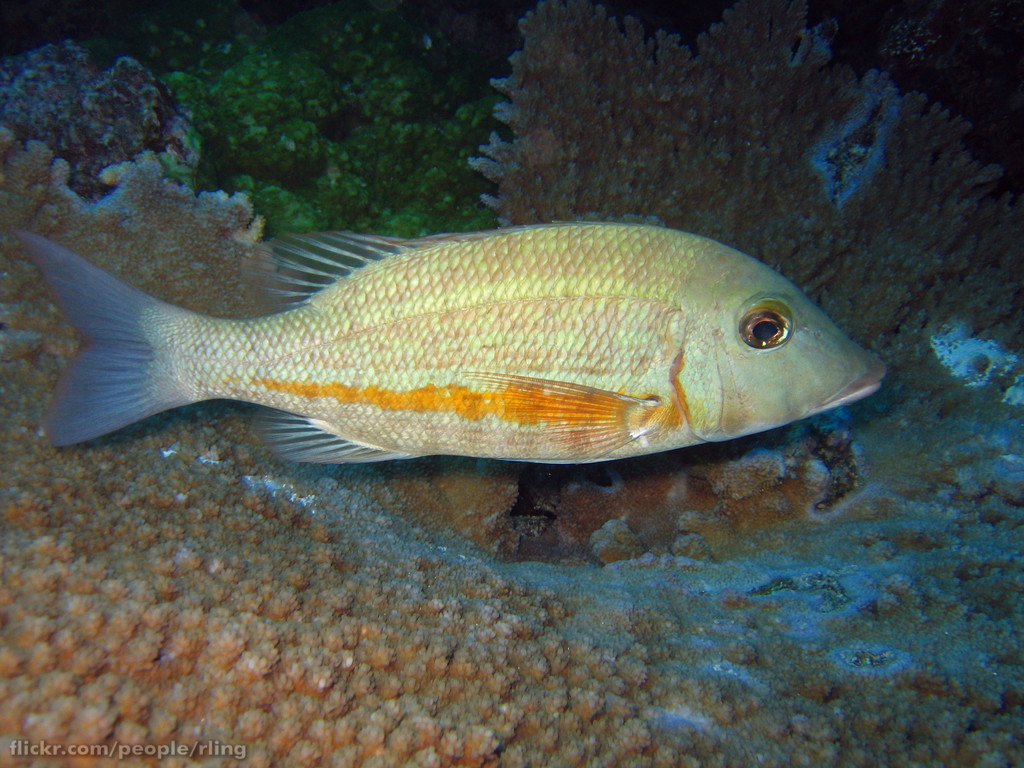

Conservation status
- Least Concern (IUCN 3.1)

Scientific classification
- Kingdom: Animalia
- Phylum: Chordata
- Class: Actinopterygii
- Order: Acanthuriformes
- Family: Lethrinidae
- Genus: Lethrinus
- Species: L. obsoletus

Binomial name
- Lethrinus obsoletus (Forsskål, 1775)

Synonyms
- Sciaena obsoleta Forsskål, 1775; Sciaena ramak Forsskål, 1775; Lethrinus ramak (Forsskål, 1775); Lethrinus cutambi Seale, 1910

= Lethrinus obsoletus =

Species of fish

Lethrinus obsoletus, the orange-striped emperor, yellow-banded emperor or yellowstripe emperor, is a species of marine ray-finned fish belonging to the family Lethrinidae, the emperors or emperor breams. This species has a wide Indo-Pacific distribution.

== Taxonomy ==
Lethrinus obsoletus was first formally described as Sciaena obsoleta by the Swedish-speaking Finnish explorer, orientalist, naturalist Peter Forsskål and published in 1775 in Descriptiones animalium, edited by Carsten Niebuhr. No type locality was given, but it is assumed to be the Red Sea. Some authors place the genus Lethrinus in the monotypic subfamily Lethrininae, with all the other genera of Lethrinidae placed in the Monotaxinae. However, the 5th edition of Fishes of the World does not recognise the subfamilies traditionally accepted within the family Lethrinidae as valid. The family Lethrinidae is classified by the 5th edition of Fishes of the World as belonging to the order Spariformes.

== Etymology ==
Lethrinus obsoletus has the specific name obsoletus, which means "worn out" or "decayed". This appears to be an allusion to the faint yellow-purple stripe, which was described as "orange-yellow" in contemporaneous accounts.

== Description ==
Lethrinus obsoletus has its dorsal fin supported by 10 spines and 9 soft rays, while there are 2 spines and 8 soft rays supporting its anal fin. The body is moderately deep, the depth fitting into its standard length 2.4 to 2.8 times. The dorsal profile of the head around the eye is straight or a little convex, and on the snout it is also slightly convex. The teeth in the jaws at the sides of the mouth are rounded or conical. The axilla of the pectoral fin is densely scaled. The overall colour is light tan to olive-brown, with a horizontal yellow-orange stripe along the lower flank between the base of the pectoral fin to the caudal peduncle. There are two indistinct yellowish orange stripes above the main stripe, and there are a number of wide, faint, vertical and oblique dark and light coloured bands on the head, with white spots sometinmes showing under the eyes. The fins are whitish or yellowish brown, and are sometimes blotched. This species has a maximum published total length of 60 cm (24 in), although 30 cm (12 in) is more typical.

== Distribution and habitat ==
Lethrinus obsoletus has a wide distribution in the Indian and Western Pacific oceans. It is found along the coast of eastern Africa from the Red Sea south to Sodwana Bay in South Africa. It is found across the Indian Ocean into the Pacific as far as the Ryukyu Islands, Tonga and Samoa. In Australian waters it is found at Rowley Shoals, Scott Reef and Hibernia Reef off Western Australia, the Cocos (Keeling) Islands, Ashmore Reef in the Timor Sea and along the northern Great Barrier Reef off Queensland. The orange-striped emperor is typically found in seagrass beds, as well as over sand and rubble areas in lagoons and in reefs. The juveniles prefer seagrass beds; as they grow, they begin to live in reefs. They are found as deep as 30 m (98 ft).

== Biology ==
Lethrinus obsoletus preys mainly on crustaceans, molluscs and echinoderms. It is a protogynous hermaphrodite, and in Palau, spawning takes place between November and April, happening monthly, on the last five days of the lunar month.
