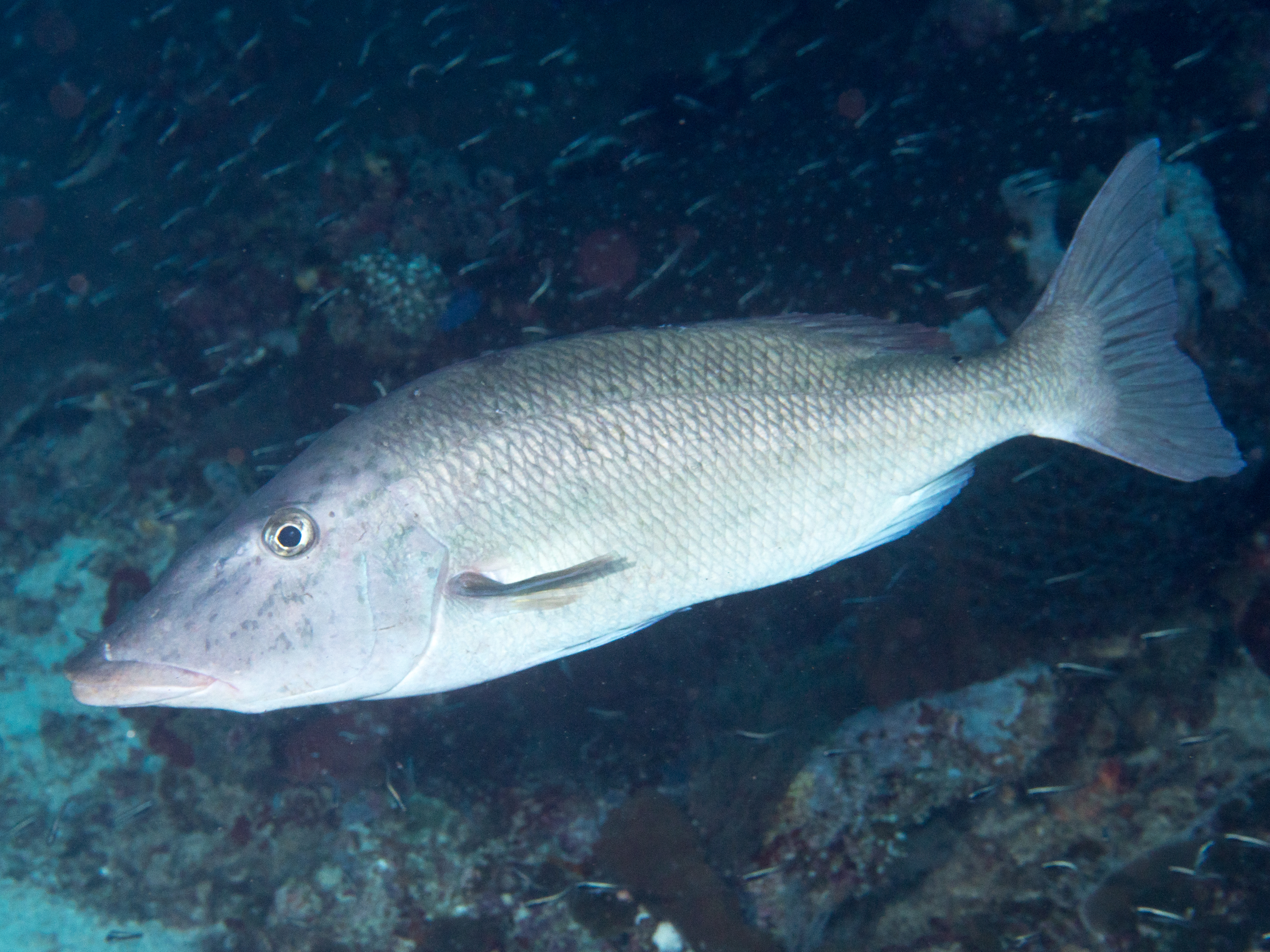
- In Indonesia

Conservation status
- Least Concern (IUCN 3.1)

Scientific classification
- Kingdom: Animalia
- Phylum: Chordata
- Class: Actinopterygii
- Order: Acanthuriformes
- Family: Lethrinidae
- Genus: Lethrinus
- Species: L. olivaceus

Binomial name
- Lethrinus olivaceus Valenciennes 1830

Synonyms
- Lethrinus longirostris Playfair, 1867; Lethrinus rostratus Valenciennes, 1830; Lethrinus rostratus specificus Borodin, 1932; Lethrinus waigiensis Valenciennes, 1830; Lethrinus xanthopterus Valenciennes, 1830

= Lethrinus olivaceus =

Species of fish

Lethrinus olivaceus, common name longface emperor or long-nosed emperor, is a species of marine ray-finned fish belonging to the family Lethrinidae, the emperors or emperor breams. This species has a wide Indo-Pacific distribution.

== Taxonomy ==
Lethrinus olivaceus was first formally described by the French zoologist Achille Valenciennes in 1830 with its type locality given as Anyer in West Java, Indonesia. Lethrinus longirostris has been considered to be synonymous with this species but was confirmed as a separate valid species based on morphological and genetic differences in 2022. Some authors place the genus Lethrinus in the monotypic subfamily Lethrininae, with all the other genera of Lethrinidae placed in the Monotaxinae, however, the 5th edition of Fishes of the World does not recognise the subfamilies traditionally accepted within the family Lethrinidae as valid. The family Lethrinidae is classified by the 5th edition of Fishes of the World as belonging to the order Spariformes.

== Description ==
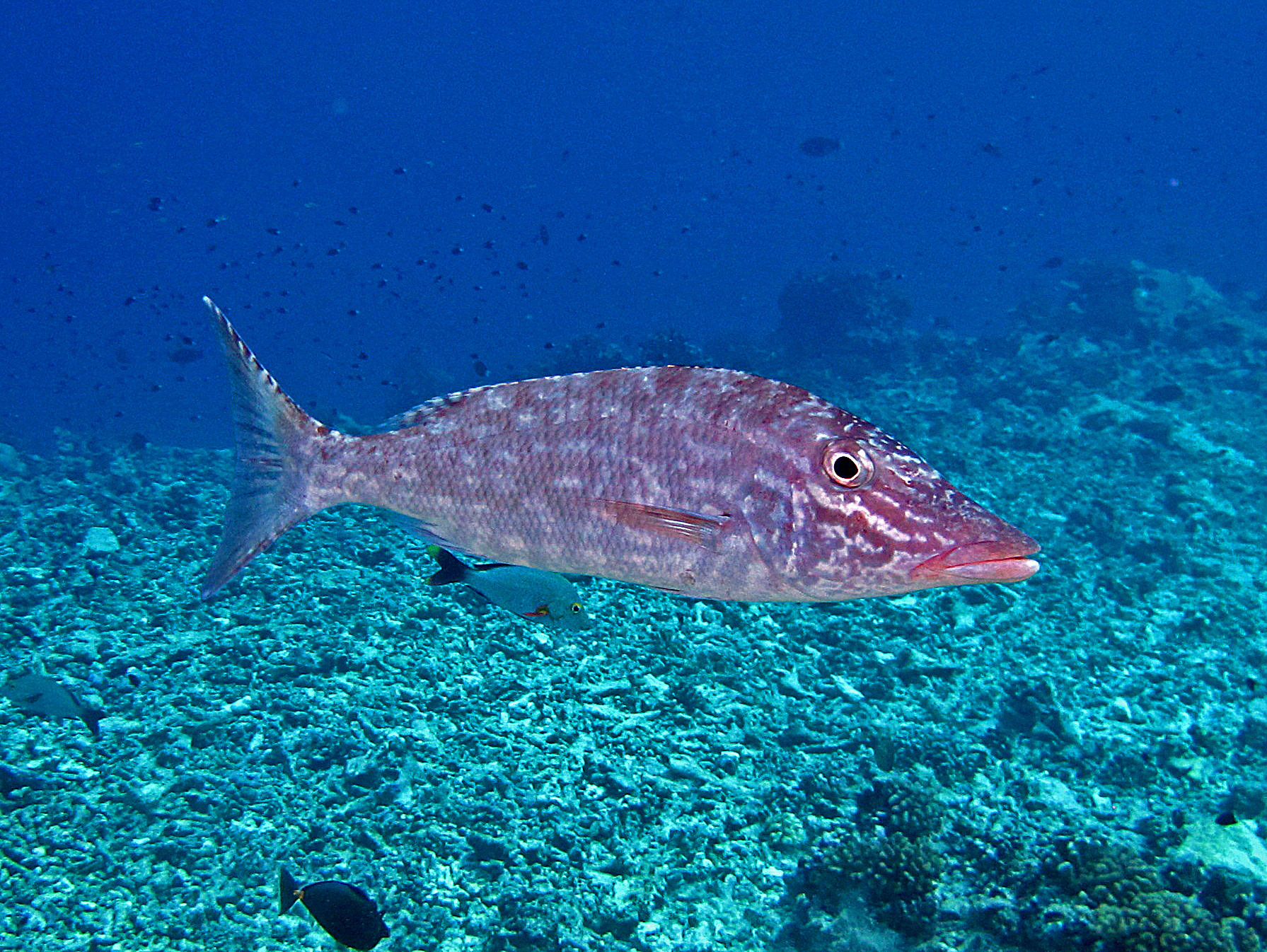
A different pattern of Lethrinus olivaceus

Lethrinus olivaceus has a body which has a standard length that is 2.8 to 3.4 times its depth with an elongated snout. In large specimens there may be a hump on the snout to the front of the eyes. The dorsal fin is supported by 10 spines and 9 soft rays while the anal fin is supported by 3 spines and 8 soft rays. The teeth on the jaws at the sides of the mouth are conical. The inner pectoral fin axilla has no scales. The overall colour is olive grey with a scattering of irregular dark blotches on the body and sinuous dark lines on the snout. This species has a maximum published total length of 100 cm (39 in), although 70 cm (28 in) is more typical.

== Distribution ==
This species is widespread in Indo-West Pacific, from Red Sea and East Africa to Samoa and Ryukyu Islands.

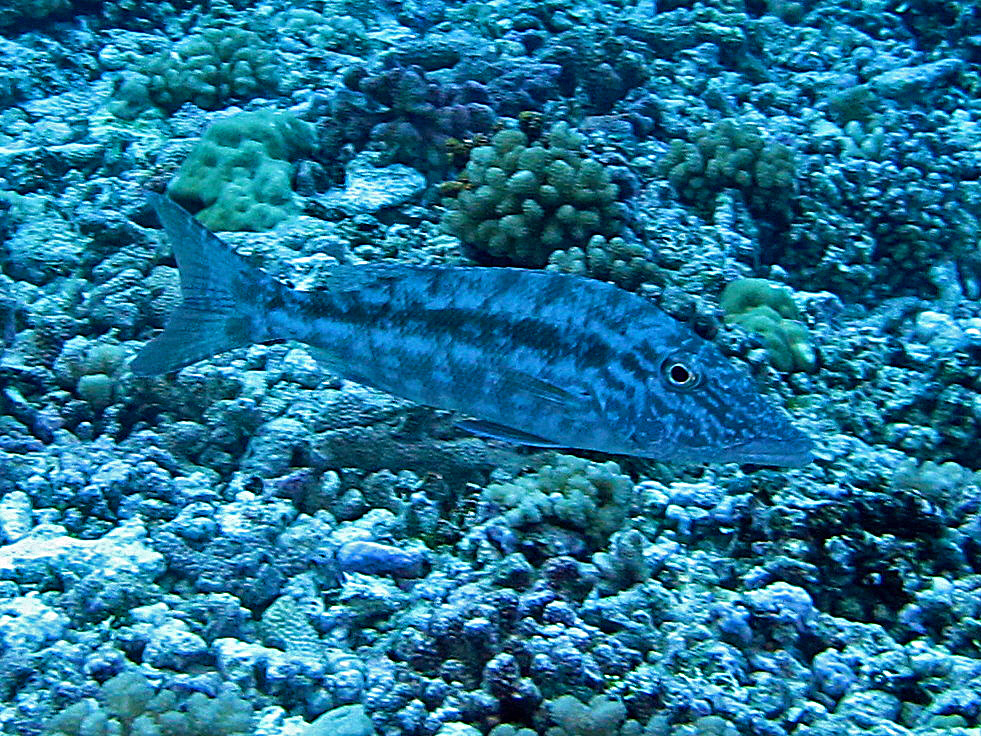
In French Polynesia

== Habitat ==
It is a reef-associated species and it can be found in lagoons, in sandy coastal areas and in reef slopes, at depths of 1 to 185 m.

== Biology ==
These very active and fast swimming fishes often occur in large schools, but adults are usually solitary. They are occasionally found in small schools with Lethrinus microdon. They feed mainly on crustaceans, cephalopods and fishes.

== Fisheries ==
Lethrinus olivaceus is fished for using handline fishing and fish traps, with trawling and gillnetting also being sometimes used. In New Caledonia, and possibly other regions of Oceania, this species has been found to be a cause of Ciguatera fish poisoning.
