= Haynes Gibbes Alleyne =

Physician and zoologist

Haynes Gibbes Alleyne (born Saint James, Barbados 14 October 1813, died Sydney, 9 September 1882) was a medical doctor and zoologist who practised in Australia and who is well known for his studies on the fishes of Australia.

Alleyne was born on 14 October 1813 in Saint James on Barbados, his father was John Gay Alleyne, a plantation owner, and his mother was Johanna Bishop, a granddaughter of General Fitzroy Maclean.

Alleyne is known to have studied medicine at the University of Edinburgh but he left there for New South Wales, arriving in April 1839. He seems to have taken part in a cattle farming venture with a cousin but this failed and after he was declared insolvent in 1844 he then left Australia. He was originally headed for the Marquesas but changed his mind and disembarked in New Zealand where he took up a military commission and fought in the Hone Heke War. In this conflict he distinguished himself for both gallantry and medical skill. He returned to Edinburgh where he completed his medical degree in 1846.

After this he returned to Australia, where he was registered as a medical practitioner in Sydney on 3 July 1848. In May 1848 he was appointed coroner in Liverpool, New South Wales and in 1852 he became the health officer for Port Jackson. In 1852 it was noted that Alleyne had used chloroform at the Sydney Infirmary in a successful amputation of the left leg of a girl with "strumous disease". He also played an important part in the suppression of outbreaks of smallpox in Port Jackson in 1876 and 1881.

In addition to his duties as a government health officer he took up other roles. Alleyne was an honorary physician for the Sydney Infirmary in 1855–73 and then was made honorary consulting physician in 1875. He served a member of the New South Wales Medical Board from 1854–82, becoming its president in 1877. He also served on the Immigration Board from 1852 and was its chairman in 1879–80. In addition he was president of the NSW Pharmacy Board from 1877 to 1881. Alleyne was active in the health and cultural life of Sydney in a number of other ways being an honorary member of the Government Benevolent Asylums Board for the Infirm and Destitute in 1862–76, the Board of Visitors to Lunatic Asylums from 1876 and a trustee of the Australian Museum from 1880. He was also an examiner in medicine at the University of Sydney in 1867. In 1876 was appointed medical adviser to the government of New South Wales.

Outside of medicine Alleyne studied ichthyology and published a monograph on the fishes of Port Jackson. He also published ichthyological papers in conjunction with William John Macleay.

Alleyne died, without marrying, on 9 September 1882 at the age of 68, having had an "apopleptic fit" while preparing to go out. He had links to the Sydney suburb of Willoughby as in 1858 he bought five portions of land with a combined area of 103 acres (42 ha) on the Little Sugar Loaf Peninsula, now known as Castle Cove. In the area of East Chatswood in Sydney there is a street, Alleyne Street, named after him.
