= Handline fishing =

Fishing technique where a single fishing line is held in the hands

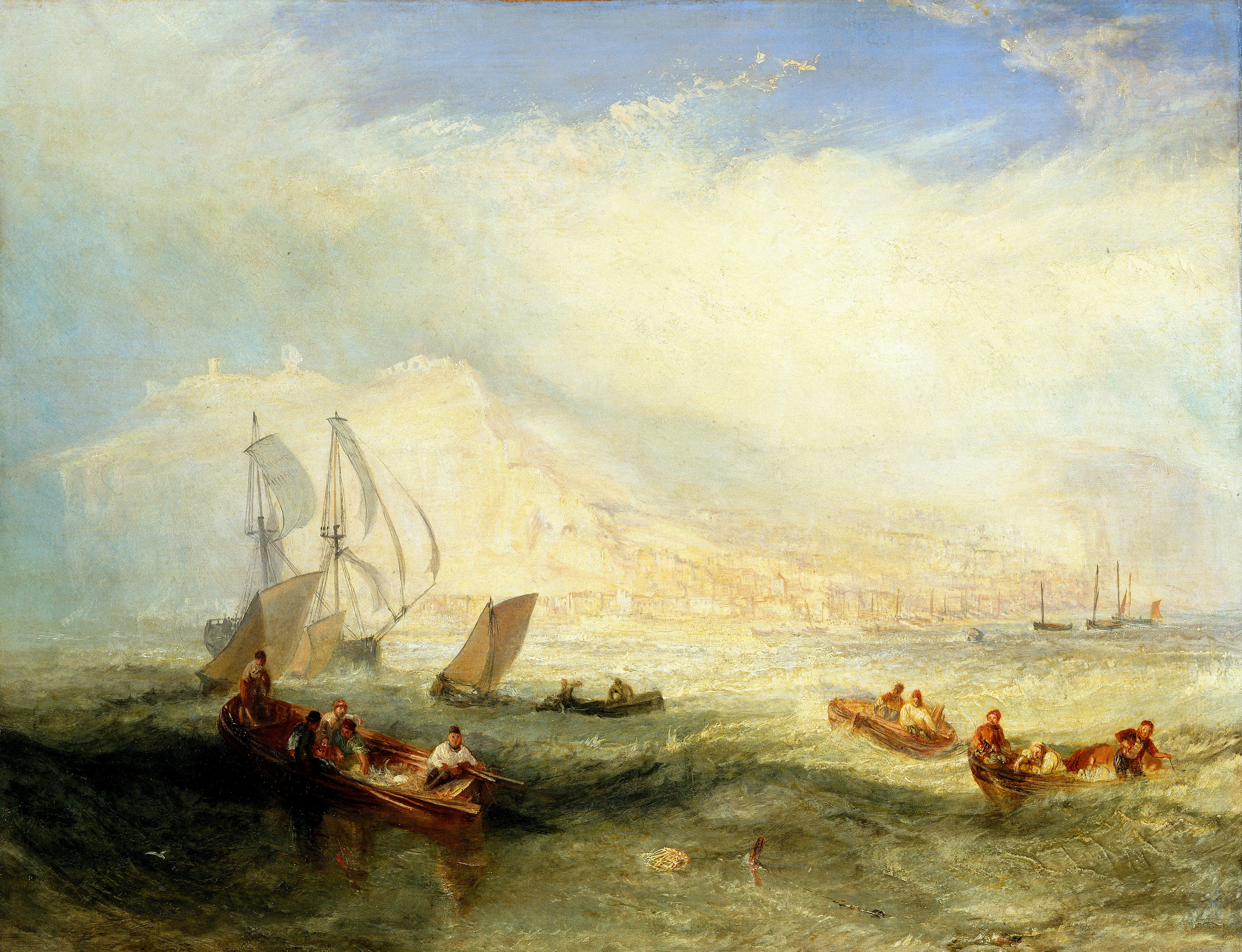
Line Fishing, Off Hastings, oil painting by J. M. W. Turner, circa 1835

Handline fishing, or handlining, is a fishing technique where a single fishing line is held in the hands, rather than with a fishing rod like the usual angling, of which handlining is a subtype. Handlining is not to be confused with handfishing, which is catching fish by hand. When handlining, one or more fishing lures or baited hooks are attached to the line, and a fishing lure and often a weight and/or a fishing float can also be attached to the line. Handlining is among the oldest forms of fishing and is still practiced throughout the world today.

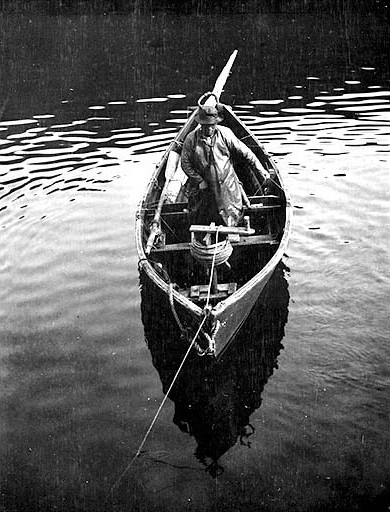
Handlining for codfish in Alaska, 1912

The fishing bait can be still fished, trolled or jigged up and down in a series of short movements. Often handling is done close to the bottom of the body of water but can also be done near or on the surface.

== Salt water handlining ==
Ocean handlining is often used to catch groundfish and squid but other species are sometimes caught, including pelagic fish. Sea handlining is a good way to catch larger oceanic fish.

== Freshwater handlining ==
Handlining is also used for catching fresh water fish. Panfish, walleyes, and other freshwater game fish can be caught using handlining fishing techniques. Handlining can be practiced from the shore or from a fishing boat. Walleye anglers practice handlining over moderately deep water in a drifting boat. Handlining is also practiced by ice fishing anglers.

== Techniques ==
A jigging motion can be used to attract fish which are normally caught while trying to strike the lure but they can also be snagged by the hooks as they investigate the jigged lure. The lure can also be fished motionless and the angler feels for the bait to be picked up by a fish and then sets the hook after waiting for the fish to fully take the bait. After a strike occurs the hook is set and then the fish is hauled in and the caught fish is removed.

== See also ==
- Fishing techniques
- Jigging
- Trolling (fishing)
- Crab lining
