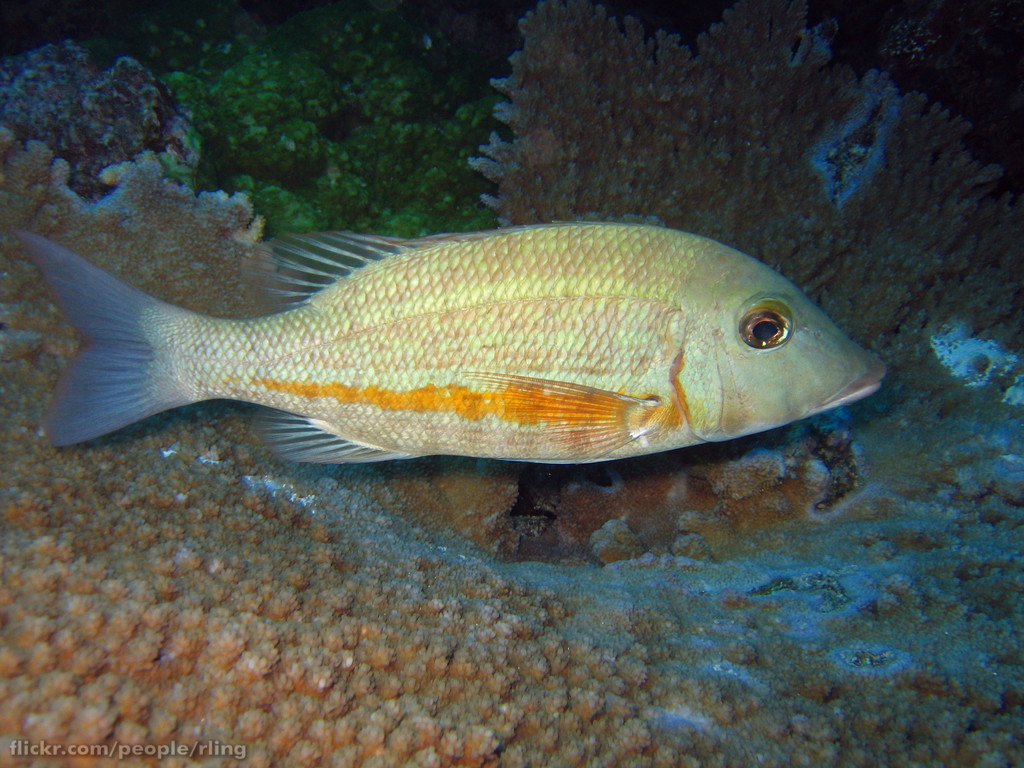
- Orange-striped emperor (Lethrinus obsoletus)

Scientific classification
- Kingdom: Animalia
- Phylum: Chordata
- Class: Actinopterygii
- Order: Acanthuriformes
- Family: Lethrinidae; Bonaparte, 1831

Subfamilies and genera
- see text

= Lethrinidae =

Family of fishes

Lethrinidae are a family of ray-finned fishes belonging to the order Spariformes commonly known as emperors, emperor breams, and pigface breams.

These fish are found in tropical waters of the Pacific and Indian Oceans, and Lethrinus atlanticus is also found in the eastern Atlantic Ocean. They are benthic feeders, consuming invertebrates and small fishes. Some species have molariform teeth which they use to eat shelled invertebrates, such as molluscs and crabs.

== Taxonomy ==
Lethrinidae was first proposed as a family name by the French zoologist Charles Lucien Bonaparte in 1831. Traditionally this family has been classified within the Perciformes, as part of the group of families some authorities called the "Sparoid lineage", this included the families Centrarchidae, Nemipteridae, Lethrinidae and Sparidae. Molecular phylogenetics as used in more modern classifications has meant that the Spariformes is recognised as a valid order within the Percomorpha containing six families, with the Centrarchidae retained in the Perciformes, and Callanthidae, Sillaginidae and Lobotidae included. Other workers have found that the Centrarchidae is synonymous with Sparidae and that the Spariformes contains only the remaining three families of the "Sparoid lineage". This family and the Nemipteridae are more closely related to each other than they are to the Sparidae.

=== Subdivisions ===
This family has been subdivided into two subfamilies by some authors, the monotypic Lethrininae, containing the genus Lethrinus and the Monotaxinae, containing the remaining genera. This validity of these subfamilies is not supported by the 5th edition of Fishes of the World.

=== Genera ===
The following four genera (including 45 species) are classified within the familey Lethrinidae:

- Lethrinus Cuvier, 1829
- Gnathodentex Bleeker, 1873
- Gymnocranius Klunzinger, 1870
- Monotaxis Anonymous [Bennett], 1830
- Wattsia W. L. Y. Chan & Chilvers, 1974

== Etymology ==
Lethrinidae takes its name from its type genus, Lethrinus which was the name in Greek for fishes in the Sparid genus Pagellus.

== Characteristics ==
Lethrinidae breams have a continuous dorsal fin which is supported by 10 spines and 9 or 10 soft rays and an anal fin that is supported by 3 spines and between 9 and 10 soft rays. They have an emarginate or forked caudal fin. The terminal mouth varies in size from small to medium-sized and has thick, fleshy lips and a potrusible upper jaw. There is a row of canine-like teeth on the outer side of the front both jaws with molar-like or conical teeth on the sides and an inner row of bristle like teeth at the front too, there are no teeth on the roof of the mouth. The largest species in the family is Lethrinus olivaceus with a maximum published total length of 100 centimetres (40 inches) while the smallest are Lethrinus mitchelli and Lethrinus variegatus both with a maximum published total length of 20 centimetres (8 inches).

== Distribution and habitat ==
Lethrinidae fishes are found mainly in the tropical Indian and Western Pacific Oceans, with a single species, Lethrinus atlanticus, being found in the Eastern Atlantic Ocean. They are coastal fishes and are associated with reefs but prefer substrates of sand and rubble.

== Biology ==
Lethrinidae fishes are mostly bottom feeding carnivores and they typically have strong jaws. The teeth type and jaw structure depend on the diet, for example, species such as the humpnose big-eye bream (Monotaxis grandoculis) possesses large, well-developed molar-like teeth with a short, blunt snout and preys largely on molluscs, sea urchins and other hard-shelled benthic invertebrates while species such as Lethrinus olivaceus has jaws equipped with conical teeth at the sides and a long, sloping snout and its prey is largely other fishes and crustaceans. They are mostly nocturnal feeders and some species undertake diel migrations to feed in different habitats at night from the diurnal habitat. Lethrinids are solitary but some species gather in small aggregations, although they will gather together in large numbers to spawn. Spawning appears to be a night time activity and has been little studied.

== Fisheries ==
Lethrinidae species are an important component of some commercial, artisanal and recreational fisheries and their importance in any fishery varies geographically and over time. The valuable species to fisheries are the larger and commoner species while the smaller and uncommon species are not valued. They are most commonly caught in Mauritius, the Arabian Peninsula and Fiji.

== Gallery ==
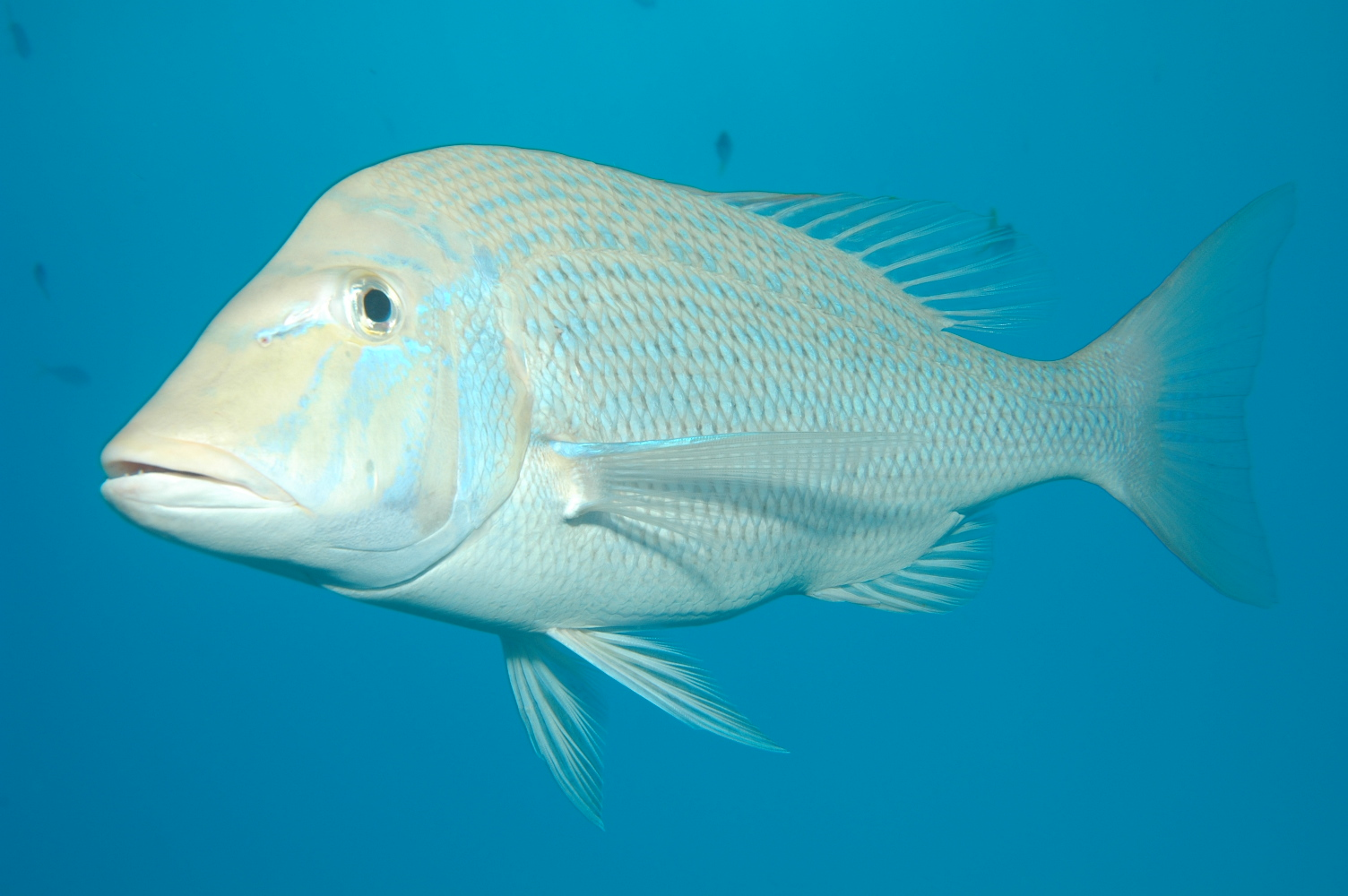
Longface emperor (Lethrinus olivaceus)

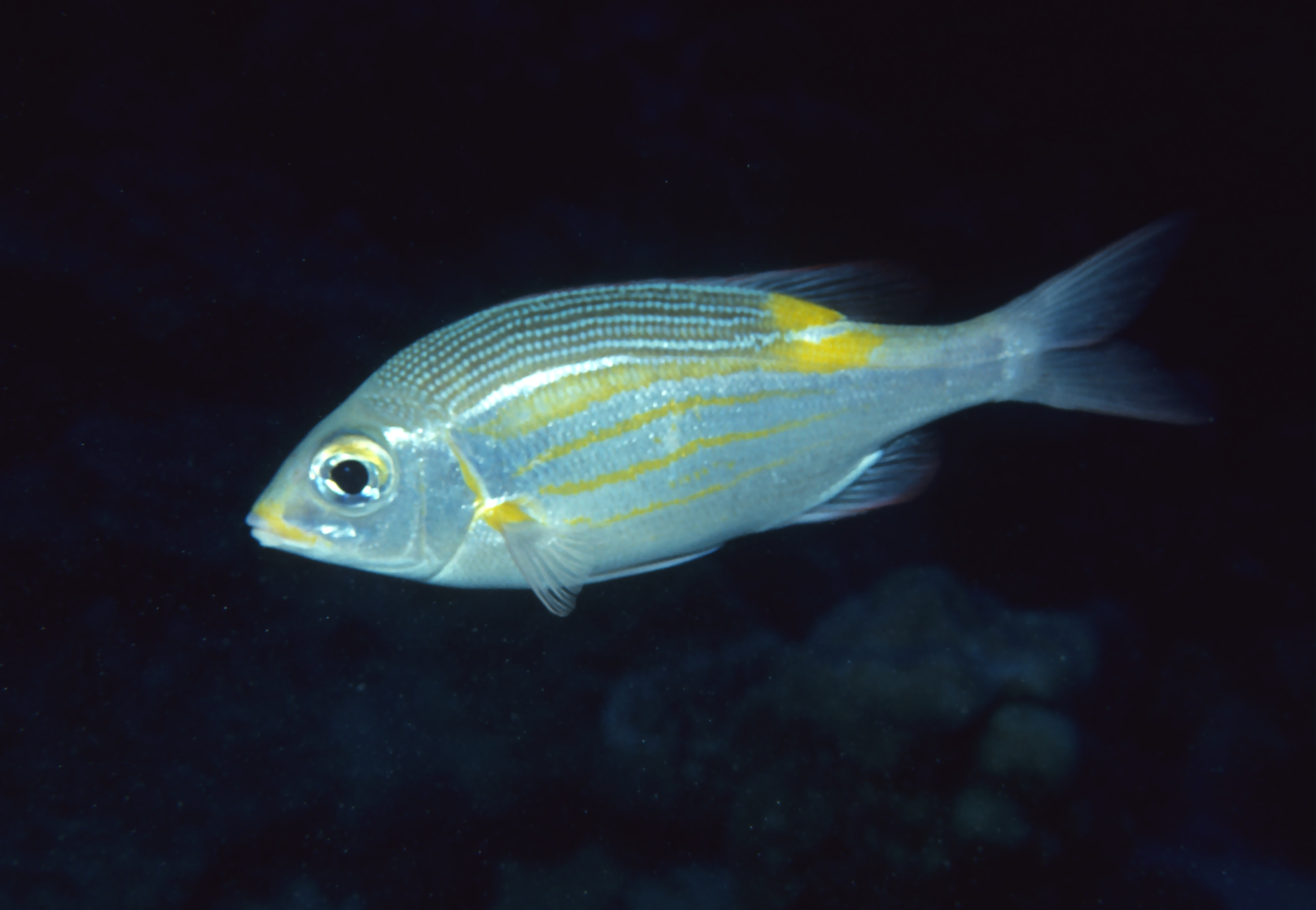
Striped large-eye bream (Gnathodentex aureolineatus)

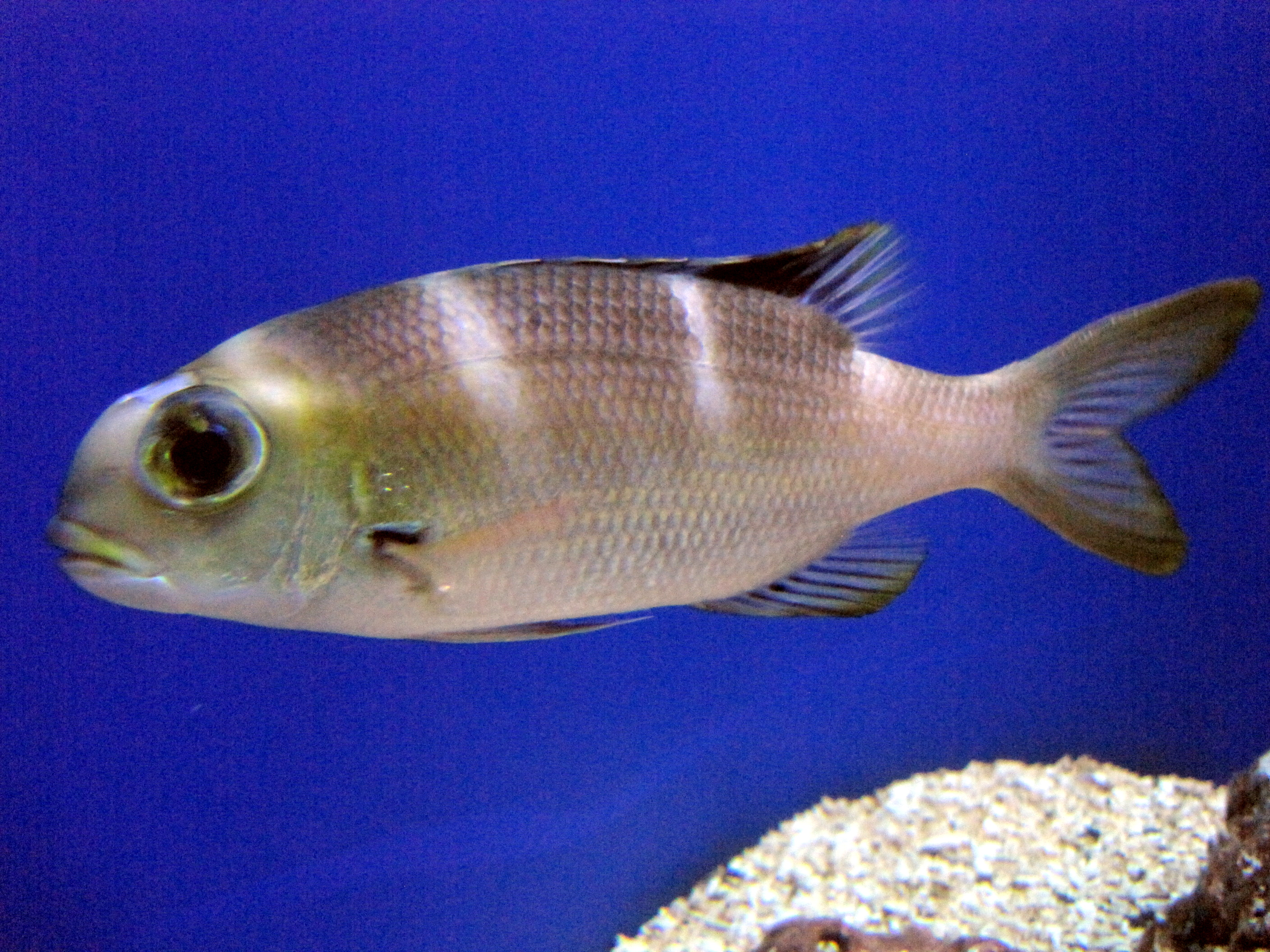
Humpnose big-eye bream (Monotaxis grandoculis)
