= List of recently extinct fishes =

- Extinct in the wild (EW): 11 species
- Critically endangered (CR): 906 species
- Endangered (EN): 1,533 species
- Vulnerable (VU): 1,740 species
- Near threatened (NT, LR/cd): 1,042 species
- Least concern (LC): 18,621 species
- Data deficient (DD): 5,492 species
Fish species (IUCN, 2025-2)
- 29,447 extant species have been evaluated
- 23,955 of those are fully assessed (Note: excludes data deficient evaluations.)
- 19,663 are not threatened at present
- 4,292 to 9,784 are threatened (Note: Threatened comprises CR, EN and VU. Upper estimate additionally includes DD.)
- 113 to 268 are extinct or extinct in the wild:
  - 102 extinct (EX) species (Note: Chart omits extinct (EX) species)
  - 11 extinct in the wild (EW)
  - 147 possibly extinct [CR(PE)]
  - 8 possibly extinct in the wild [CR(PEW)]

As of September 2016, the International Union for Conservation of Nature (IUCN) lists 65 extinct fish species, 87 possibly extinct fish species, and eleven extinct in the wild fish species.

== Cartilaginous fish ==
Possibly extinct species

- Lost shark (Carcharhinus obsoletus)
- Red Sea torpedo (Torpedo suessii)

Extinct species

- Java stingaree (Urolophus javanicus)

== Lampreys ==
Extinct species

- Ukrainian migratory lamprey (Eudontomyzon sp. 'migratory')

Possibly extinct species

- Tetrapleurodon spadiceus (Tetrapleurodon spadiceus)

== Ray-finned fishes ==
There are 64 extinct species, 85 possibly extinct species, and six extinct in the wild species of ray-finned fish evaluated by the IUCN.

=== Acipenseriformes ===
Includes sturgeons and paddlefishes.

- Chinese paddlefish (Psephurus gladius)

Possibly extinct species

- Syr Darya sturgeon (Pseudoscaphirhynchus fedtschenkoi)

Extinct in the wild species

- Dabry's sturgeon (Sinosturio dabryanus)

=== Salmoniformes ===
Extinct species

- Longjaw cisco (Coregonus alpenae)
- Coregonus bezola
- Coregonus fera
- Lake Constance whitefish (Coregonus gutturosus)
- Gravenche (Coregonus hiemalis)
- Deepwater cisco (Coregonus johannae)
- Blackfin cisco (Coregonus nigripinnis)
- Coregonus restrictus
- Salmo pallaryi
- Salmo schiefermuelleri
- Silver trout (Salvelinus agassizii)
- Salvelinus inframundus
- Salvelinus neocomensis

Possibly extinct species

- Coregonus hoferi

Extinct in the wild species

- Kunimasu (Oncorhynchus kawamurae)

=== Toothcarps ===
Extinct species

- Gölçük toothcarp (Anatolichthys splendens)
- Aplocheilichthys sp. 'Naivasha'
- Parras characodon (Characodon garmani)
- Santa Cruz pupfish (Cyprinodon arcuatus)
- Villa Lopez pupfish (Cyprinodon ceciliae)
- Cachorrito de la Trinidad (Cyprinodon inmemoriam)
- Perritos de sandia (Cyprinodon spp.)
- Catarina pupfish (Megupsilon aporus)
- Ash Meadows killifish (Empetrichthys merriami)
- Whiteline topminnow (Fundulus albolineatus)
- Amistad gambusia (Gambusia amistadensis)
- San Marcos gambusia (Gambusia georgei)
- Malagodon honahona
- Malagodon madagascariensis
- Graceful priapella (Priapella bonita)

Possibly extinct species

- Aphyolebias claudiae
- Parras pupfish (Cyprinodon latifasciatus)
- Fundulopanchax powelli
- Titicaca orestias (Orestias cuvieri)

Extinct in the wild species

- Potosi pupfish (Cyprinodon alvarezi)
- Cachorrito de charco palmal (Cyprinodon longidorsalis)
- Golden skiffia (Skiffia francesae)

=== Cypriniformes ===
Includes carps, minnows, loaches and relatives.

Extinct species

- Beyşehir bleak (Alburnus akili)
- İznik shemaya (Alburnus nicaeensis)
- Anabarilius macrolepis
- Barbodes amarus
- Barbodes baoulan
- Barbodes clemensi
- Barbodes disa
- Barbodes flavifuscus
- Barbodes herrei
- Barbodes katolo
- Barbodes lanaoensis
- Barbodes manalak
- Barbodes pachycheilus
- Barbodes palaemophagus
- Barbodes palata
- Barbodes resimus
- Barbodes tras
- Barbodes truncatulus
- Barbus microbarbis
- Snake River sucker (Chasmistes muriei)
- Chondrostoma scodrense
- Cyprinus yilongensis
- Mexican dace (Evarra bustamantei)
- Plateau chub (Evarra eigenmanni)
- Endorheic chub (Evarra tlahuacensis)
- Thicktail chub (Gila crassicauda)
- Giant Atlas barbel (Labeobarbus reinii)
- Pahranagat spinedace (Lepidomeda altivelis)
- Tunisian barb (Luciobarbus antinorii)
- Luciobarbus nasus
- Hula bream (Mirogrex hulensis)
- Harelip sucker (Moxostoma lacerum)
- Durango shiner (Notropis aulidion)
- Phantom shiner (Notropis orca)
- Salado shiner (Notropis saladonis)
- Clear Lake splittail (Pogonichthys ciscoides)
- Eğirdir minnow (Pseudophoxinus handlirschi)
- Las Vegas dace (Rhinichthys deaconi)
- Stumptooth minnow (Stypodon signifer)

Possibly extinct species

- Long-spine bream (Acanthobrama centisquama)
- Damascus bream (Acanthobrama tricolor)
- Anabarilius qiluensis
- Anabarilius yangzonensis
- Siamese bala-shak (Balantiocheilos ambusticauda)
- Haditha cavefish (Caecocypris basimi)
- Diyarbakir spined loach (Cobitis kellei)
- Cyprinus barbatus
- Cyprinus ilishaestomus
- Dianchi carp (Cyprinus micristius)
- Cyprinus qionghaiensis
- Cyprinus yunnanensis
- Hypselobarbus pulchellus
- Bovany barb (Neolissochilus bovanicus)
- Deolali minnow (Parapsilorhynchus prateri)
- Poropuntius chonglingchungi
- Akstafa spring roach (Pseudophoxinus sojuchbulagi)
- Barada spring minnow (Pseudophoxinus syriacus)
- Deccan barb (Puntius deccanensis)
- Schistura nasifilis
- Schistura tenura
- Systomus compressiformis
- Luciobrama macrocephalus

=== Gasterosteiformes ===
Extinct species

- Techirghiol stickleback (Gasterosteus crenobiontus)

=== Osmeriformes ===
Extinct species

- New Zealand grayling (Prototroctes oxyrhynchus)

=== Catfishes ===
Extinct species

- Scioto madtom (Noturus trautmani)
- Siamese flat-barbelled catfish (Platytropius siamensis)

Possibly extinct species

- Nilgiri mystus (Hemibagrus punctatus)
- Greasefish (Rhizosomichthys totae)
- Lake Victoria deepwater catfish (Xenoclarias eupogon)

=== Perciformes ===
("Perch-like")

Extinct species

- Maryland darter (Etheostoma sellare)
- Ptychochromis onilahy
- Tristramella intermedia
- Tristramella magdelainae
- Long jaw tristramella (Tristramella sacra)
- Xystichromis bayoni

Possibly extinct species

- Galapagos damsel (Azurina eupalama)
- Ctenochromis pectoralis
- Haplochromis aelocephalus
- Haplochromis antleter
- Haplochromis apogonoides
- Haplochromis argenteus
- Haplochromis barbarae
- Haplochromis bareli
- Haplochromis brownae
- Haplochromis cassius
- Haplochromis cinctus
- Haplochromis cnester
- Haplochromis coprologus
- Haplochromis crassilabris
- Haplochromis crocopeplus
- Haplochromis dentex
- Haplochromis dichrourus
- Haplochromis flavipinnis
- Haplochromis granti
- Haplochromis guiarti
- Haplochromis heusinkveldi
- Haplochromis hiatus
- Haplochromis iris
- Haplochromis ishmaeli
- Haplochromis katunzii
- Haplochromis longirostris
- Haplochromis macrognathus
- Haplochromis martini
- Haplochromis michaeli
- Haplochromis microdon
- Haplochromis mylergates
- Haplochromis nanoserranus
- Haplochromis pancitrinus
- Haplochromis parvidens
- Haplochromis percoides
- Haplochromis perrieri
- Haplochromis plutonius
- Haplochromis ptistes
- Haplochromis pyrrhopteryx
- Haplochromis sphex
- Haplochromis sulphureus
- Haplochromis teegelaari
- Haplochromis theliodon
- Haplochromis ushindi
- Haplochromis victorianus
- Haplochromis vonlinnei
- Haplochromis xenostoma
- Danube delta dwarf goby (Knipowitschia cameliae)
- Sciaena callaensis
- Stiphodon discotorquatus

=== Clupeiformes ===
- Alosa vistonica
- Alosa volgensis

=== Scorpaeniformes ===
Extinct species

- Utah Lake sculpin (Cottus echinatus)

== See also ==
- List of least concern fishes
- List of near threatened fishes
- List of vulnerable fishes
- List of endangered fishes
- List of critically endangered fishes
- List of data deficient fishes
- Sustainable seafood advisory lists and certification
