= Bagangan =

Bagangan is a common name for a number of fishes from the Philippines in various languages. It may refer to:

- Barbodes clemensi
- Barbodes resimus
- Gerres erythrourus
- Gnathodentex aureolineatus
- Lethrinus harak
- Lethrinus lentjan
- Lethrinus microdon
- Lethrinus miniatus
- Lethrinus nebulosus
- Lethrinus olivaceus
- Pentaprion longimanus

== See also ==
- Baganga, Davao Oriental, Philippines
