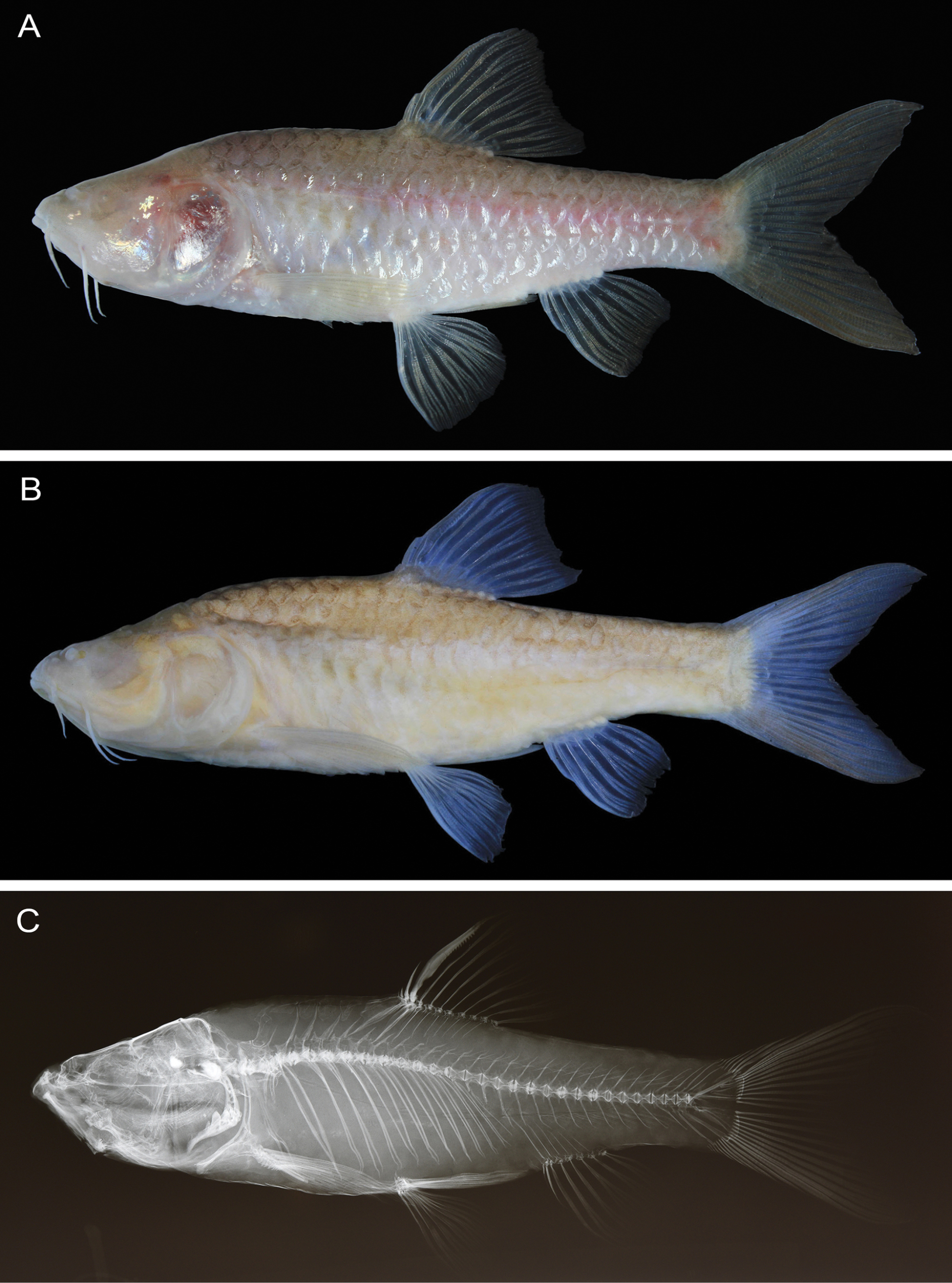
- Holotype MZB.26657; fresh, preserved, and radiography

Scientific classification
- Kingdom: Animalia
- Phylum: Chordata
- Class: Actinopterygii
- Order: Cypriniformes
- Family: Cyprinidae
- Genus: Barbodes
- Species: B. klapanunggalensis

Binomial name
- Barbodes klapanunggalensis Wibowo, Rahmadi, & Lumbantobing 2025
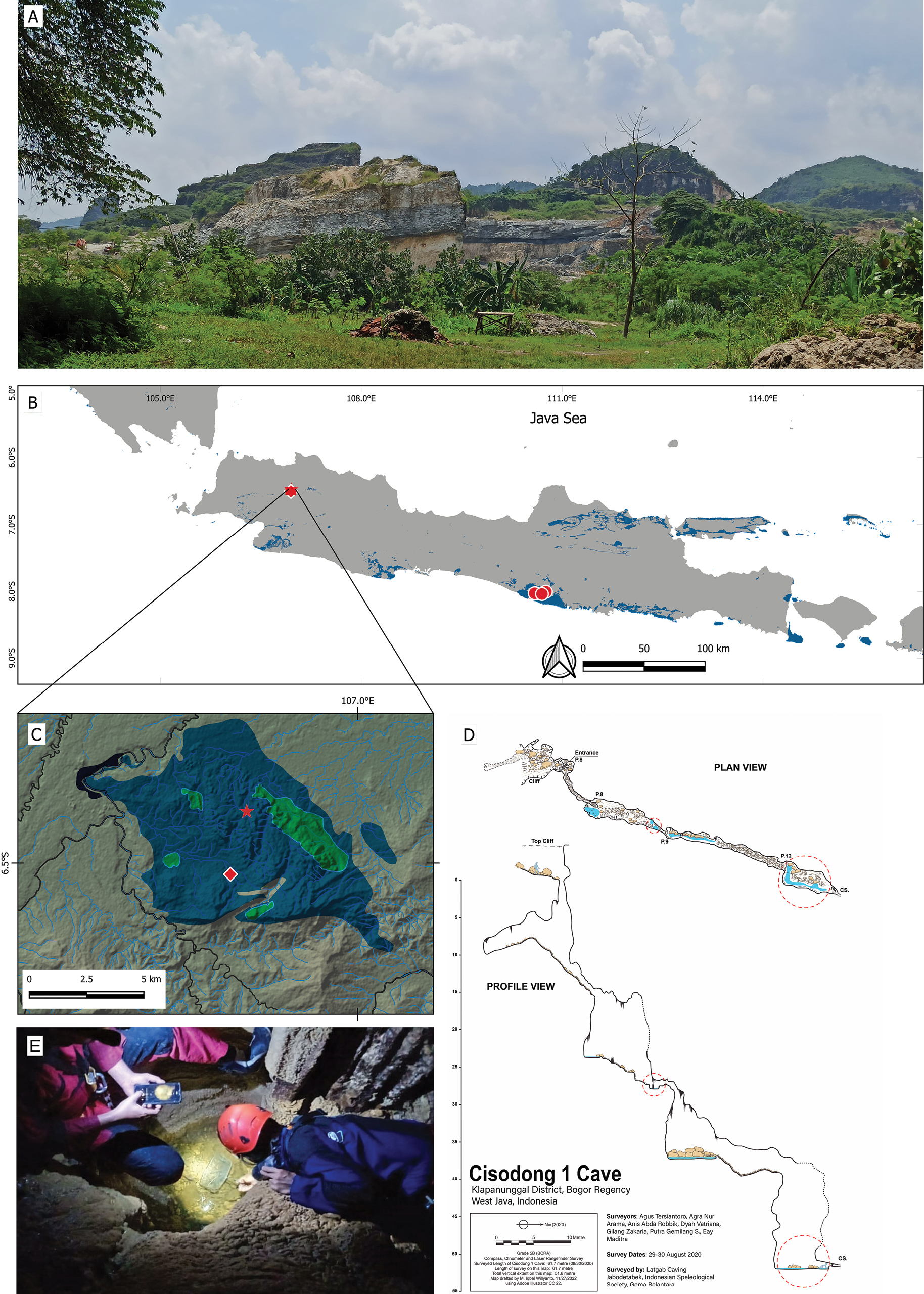

= Klapanunggal blind cave barb =

Species of cavefish from Java

Klapanunggal blind cave barb (Barbodes klapanunggalensis), known locally as wader buta, is a species of barb from the Klapanunggal karst area of Bogor Regency, West Java. It is a cavefish, being endemic to water bodies within the caves of the region; typical of cavefish (though not of Barbodes), B. klapanunggalensis is eyeless and unpigmented, and it can be distinguished from its congeners by multiple other features, including enlarged paired fins. Its small population number may be threatened by human development, such as through mining for limestone, though it is currently not under any known threat due to its isolation.

== Description ==
B. klapanunggalensis is a cavefish, and similar to two other species of Barbodes; B. microps and B. pyrpholeos in lacking pigmentation. The species is the only Barbodes to lack eyes and the orbital rim; the space is replaced by an "orbital concavity" which is "fully closed by an epidermal layer". Other diagnostic morphological features include its pectoral and pelvic fins being relatively long, and specific bodily proportions. B. klapanunggalensis has a deep body, which is deepest around the dorsal fin origin. The species has two pairs of maxillary barbels around its subterminal mouth, with the posterior (rearwards) pair being longer. They possess cycloid scales and around 12 short gill rakers.

The type specimens are 63.8 mm (2.51 in) and 73 mm (2.9 in) in standard length.

== Habitat ==
The two type specimens were collected from a small water body within the Cisodong 1 cave system of the Klapanunggal Karst area, near the village of Nambo, Bogor Regency; the creek drains into the Cileungsi River, a tributary of the Bekasi River drainage. The waters were still yet clear and with a substrate of clay. The barbs share their habitat with Stenasellus javanicus, a cave isopod. The fish were observed 27–51 m (89–167 ft) below ground, though may not be limited to this range. The cave is considered to be challenging to spelunkers, so is thought to have isolated the barbs from ecological disruption. The species were first discovered in 2020 by spelunkers of Latgab Caving Jabodetabek, ISS, and Gema Balantara, though no specimens would be collected until July 2022.

Barbodes klapanunggalensis is suspected to be endemic to the karst area, which possesses an area of 66.64 km^{2} (25.73 sq mi), of which only 6.64 km^{2} (2.56 sq mi) is considered a nature reserve (Kawasan Bentang Alam Karst Bogor). Furthermore, this karst region is disjunct from other Javan karsts. Due to this, along with its likely small population, it meets the criteria to be considered a threatened species.

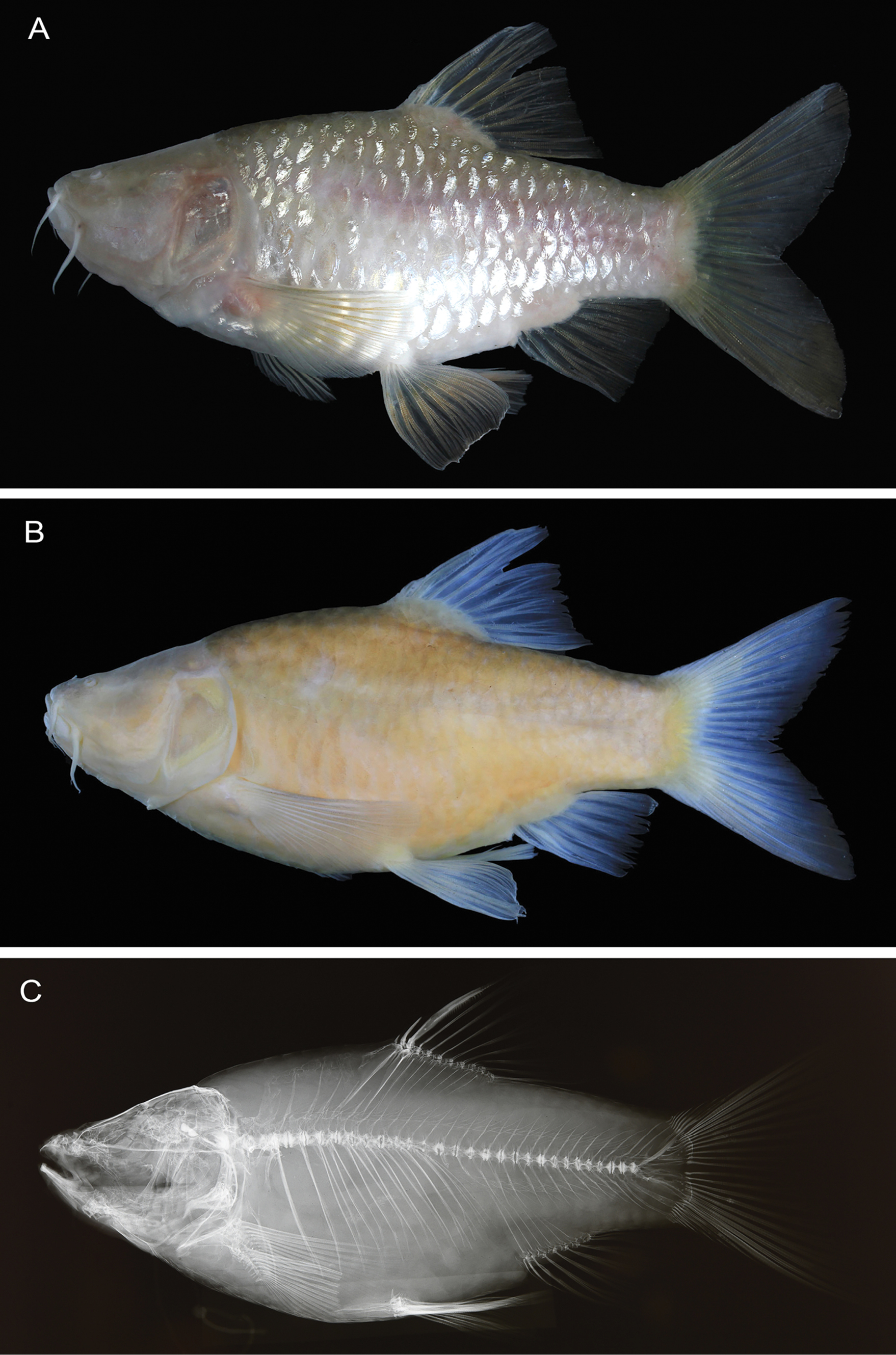
Paratype specimen; its distended abdomen was due to a "viscous fluid"
