= Lake Dapao =

Lake in Lanao del Sur, Philippines

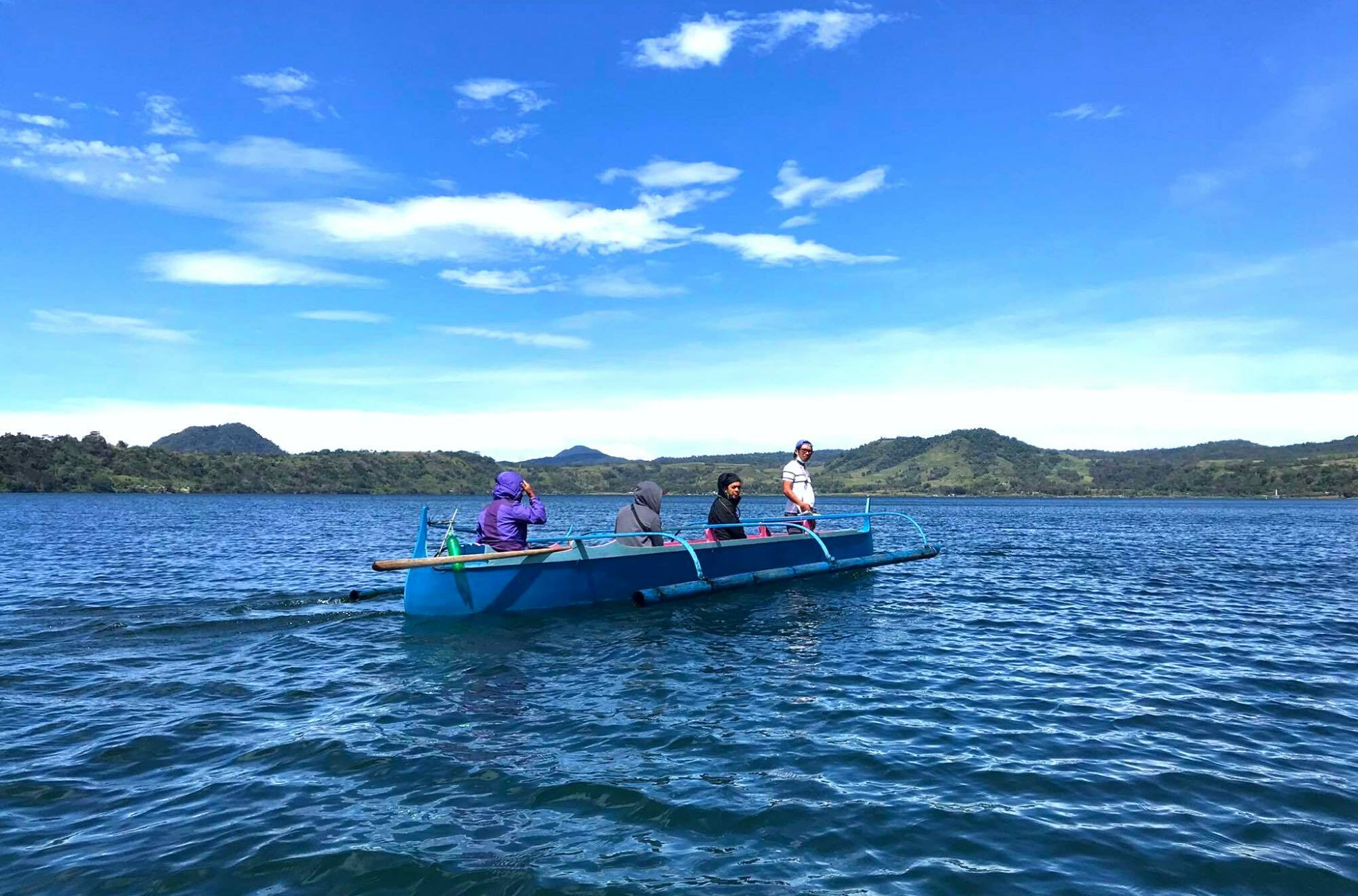

- Location within the Philippines Lake Dapao (Philippines)
- Location: Lanao del Sur
- Coordinates: 7°47′25″N 124°3′1″E
- Type: Lake
- Basin countries: Philippines
- Surface area: 1,011 ha (10.11 km^{2})
- Max. depth: 120 m (393.70 ft)
- Surface elevation: 960 m (3,149.61 ft)
- Settlements: Pualas

Lake Dapao is a deep water lake located in the province of Lanao del Sur, southwest of Lake Lanao, in the island of Mindanao in the Philippines. It is one of the deepest lakes in the country, reaching a maximum depth of 120 metres (390 ft). It has an estimated surface area of 1,011 hectares (10.11 km^{2}). The lake receives water from local run-off and several small rivers.

In 1965, the lake and its vicinity was declared as a protected national park under Republic Act 4190 that covers an area of about 1,500 square kilometres (580 mi^{2}).

Plants growing in the lake includes hydrilla (Hydrilla spp) and the filamentous alga (Clodophora spp). The lake is also rich in fish that includes dalág (Ophicephalus striatus), Mozambique tilapia (Oreochromis mossambicus), common carp (Cyprinus carpio), goby (Glossogobius giurus) and catfish (Clarias spp).

It was reported that the endangered Barbodes tumba and other endemic cyprinids were once widely distributed in the lake; however, none were found during fieldwork in 1982 and the former is believed to be locally extinct.

== See also ==
- List of national parks of the Philippines
