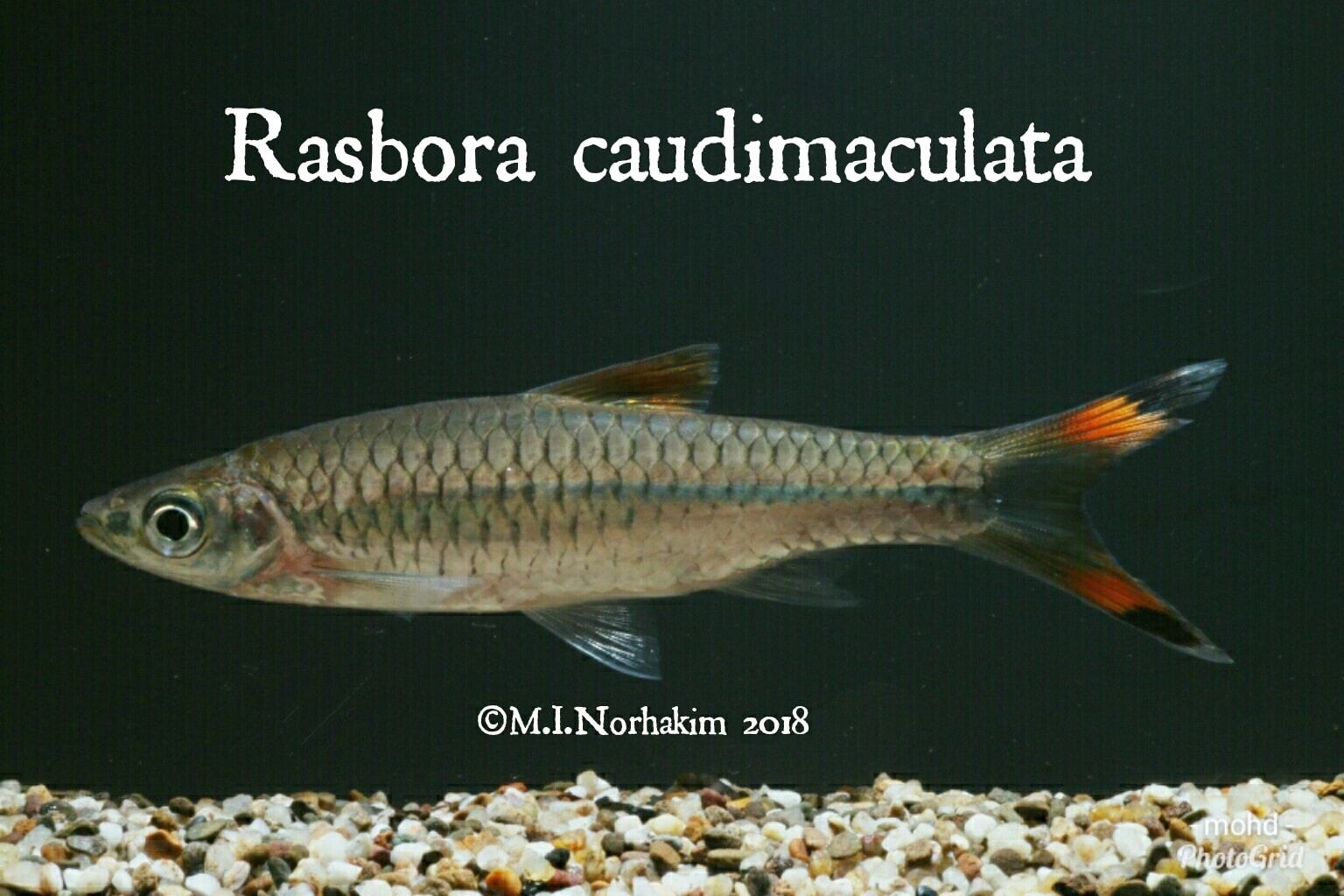

Conservation status
- Least Concern (IUCN 3.1)

Scientific classification
- Kingdom: Animalia
- Phylum: Chordata
- Class: Actinopterygii
- Order: Cypriniformes
- Family: Danionidae
- Subfamily: Rasborinae
- Genus: Rasbora
- Species: R. caudimaculata

Binomial name
- Rasbora caudimaculata Volz, 1903

= Greater scissortail =

Species of fish

The greater scissortail (Rasbora caudimaculata) is a species of ray-finned fish in the genus Rasbora. It inhabits forest creeks in Malaysia, Indonesia and the lower Mekong basin.

== Local names ==
- Called Betelah by the Merap community
- Called Beteluh by the Punan community
- Called Beteloh by the Kenyah community
- Called Seluang Engkrunyuk in Malay
- Called Enseluai in Iban

== Description ==
a large Rasbora, able to reach a total length of 15 cm (6 inches).

Superficially resembles Rasbora trilineata, where it differ is the orange to red mark at each lobe of the caudal fin, just before the black mark on the fin lobes, and the larger adult size of R. caudimaculata. The dorsal fin on specimens may also have a light orange mark.

== Distribution ==
The geographical range of the species is debated as accounts of them from Southern Thailand and Cambodia are most likely misidentification. It is more likely the species is restricted to the southern tip of the Peninsular Malaysia, the Greater Sunda Islands and the whole of Borneo

In Borneo, the species seem to be in abundant while in Peninsular Malaysia it is not a common species with very localized populations, possibly due to loss of habitat.

== Habitat ==
It is an adaptable fast swimming species, able to live in fast flowing forest streams with a sandy or rocky bottom, or even sluggish blackwater habitats like peat swamp rivers. In most of these habitats, submerged plants or wood are used as hiding places from predators, young individuals are even documented near section of river where Eusideroxylon zwageri trees grow.

Some other species that live sympatricly with R. caudimaculata are R. borapetensis, B. sealei and B. kuchingensis. Channa lucius have been documented predating this species.
