= Lake Lanao =

- Ranaw, Ranao (Maranao); Lawa ng Lanao (Filipino)
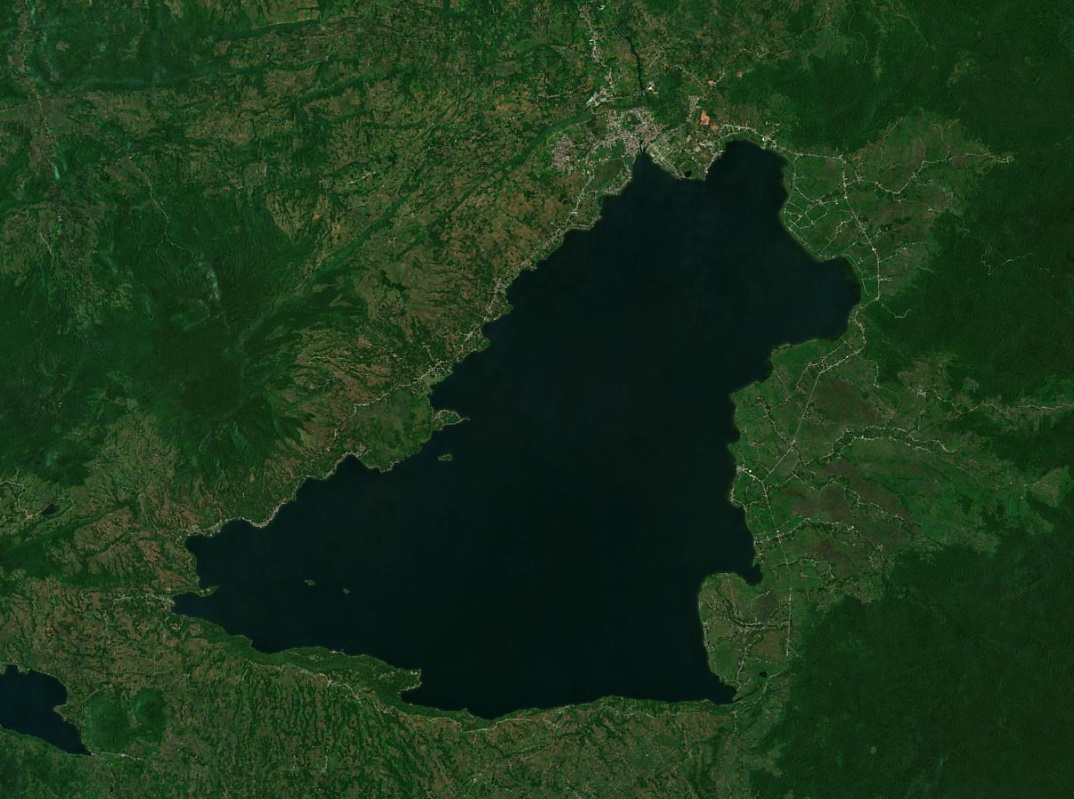
- Sentinel-2 photo

- Location within the Philippines Lake Lanao (Philippines)

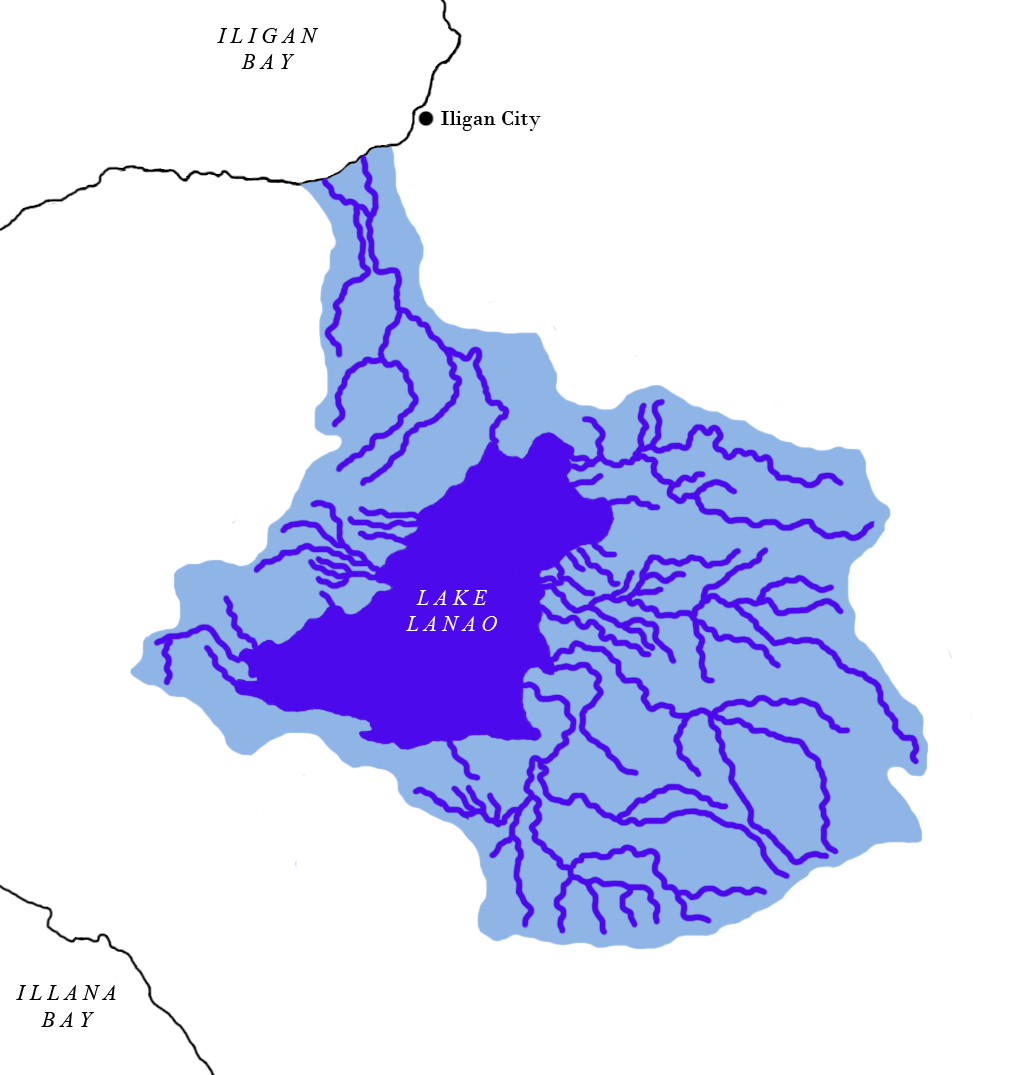
- Lake Lanao-Agus River watershed map
- Location: Lanao del Sur
- Coordinates: 07°52′48″N 124°15′09″E
- Lake type: Ancient lake, Rift lake
- Primary inflows: 4 tributaries
- Primary outflows: Agus River
- Catchment area: 1,678 km^{2} (648 sq mi)
- Basin countries: Philippines
- Max. length: 33 km (21 mi)
- Max. width: 20 km (12 mi)
- Surface area: 334 km^{2} (129 sq mi)
- Average depth: 60.3 m (198 ft)
- Max. depth: 112 m (367 ft)
- Water volume: 21.28 km^{3} (5.11 cu mi)
- Shore length^{1}: 115 km (71 mi)
- Surface elevation: 700 m (2,300 ft)
- Settlements: List: Bacolod-Kalawi; Malabang; Bayang; Binidayan; Buadiposo-Buntong; Ditsaan-Ramain; Ganassi; Lumbatan; Lumbayanague; Madalum; Madamba; Marantao; Marawi; Masiu; Mulondo; Poona Bayabao; Tamparan; Taraka; Tugaya
- ^{1} Shore length is not a well-defined measure.

Lake Lanao (Maranao: Ranao or Ranaw; Filipino: Lawa ng Ranao) is a large ancient lake in the province of Lanao del Sur, Philippines. With a surface area of 340 km^{2} (130 mi^{2}), it is the largest lake in Mindanao, the deepest and second largest lake in the Philippines, and counted as one of the 15 ancient lakes in the world. Scholars have been pushing for the lake's inclusion in the UNESCO World Heritage List. The lake's native people call themselves the Maranao or Meranaw. Their name was derived from the name of the lake, meaning "the people living around the lake".

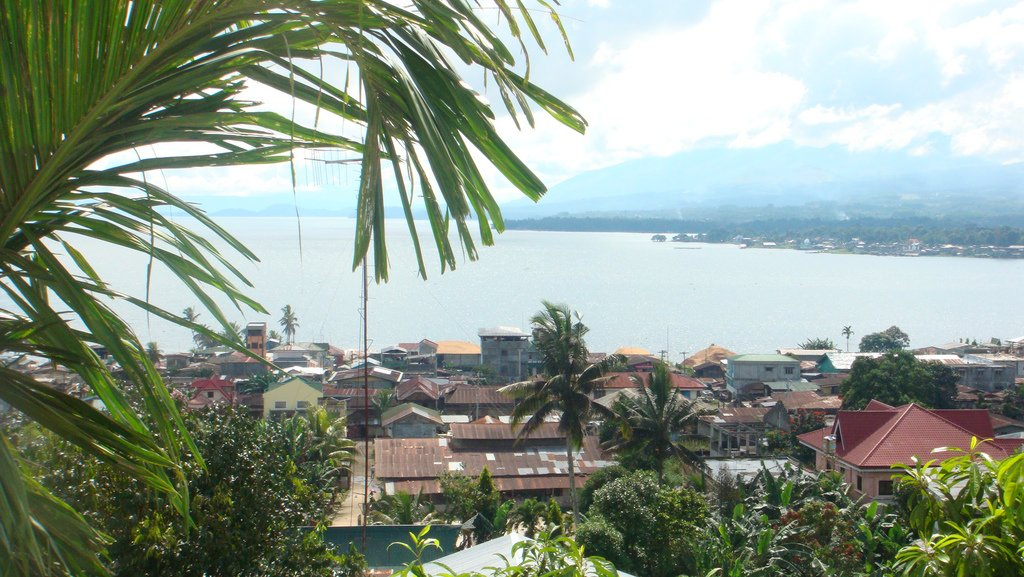
Lake Lanao, as seen from Marawi City.

== History ==
In 1965, Lake Lanao was renamed to Lake Sultan Alonto by Republic Act No. 4260, which was later repealed by Republic Act No. 6434 in 1972.

The lake has great hydroelectric potential due to its 700 meter elevation, and as such, in 1950, the Philippines National Power Corporation (NAPOCOR) began the construction of a series of hydroelectric plants titled Agus I – Agus VII along the Agus River system, which generates 70% of the electricity used by the people of Mindanao. In 1978, the Marawi Lake Regulation Dam (MLRD) was constructed at the mouth of the Agus, and five power plants were commissioned shortly afterwards (Agus I, II, IV, V, and VII). Notably, Agus I is not located on the river, but directly on the shoreline of the lake, in the heart of Marawi City. While the MLRD does not affect the function of the four downstream dams, the construction of Agus I effectively turned the lake into a reservoir, sparking significant backlash among the Maranao. In October 1990, the Maranao publicly demonstrated as Agus I was finishing construction, leading to the birth of the Save Lake Lanao Movement (SALAM), which intended to obstruct NAPOCOR's progress in building Agus I. SALAM contended that the dam would act as an artificial, alternative outlet to the Agus that is deeply unnatural and would result in a 9 meter fluctuation of the lake level. Conflict between SALAM and NAPOCOR resulted in the creation of the Task Force on Agus 1 by Aquilino Pimentel Jr., which subsequently delayed the commission date of the plant to January 14, 1992. In the two months following Agus I's operation date, President Corazon Aquino declared the Lake Lanao watershed as a reservation and established the Lake Lanao Watershed Protection and Development Council (LLWPDC), a policy group with both SALAM and NAPOCOR representatives. Despite these efforts, NAPOCOR has since not made any major concessions to the Maranao. SALAM and the Maranao continue to protect the Lanao watershed from environmental degradation.

Section 22 of Article XIII of the Bangsamoro Organic Law does not include this lake as being under the jurisdiction of the Bangsamoro Autonomous Region in Muslim Mindanao; certain sectors of the Maranao people had sought the inclusion of this lake into the Bangsamoro Organic Law.

In October 2006, a study from the Mindanao State University discovered massive algae contamination in Lake Lanao. Initially, poor sewage and agricultural waste management were seen as the culprits of the contamination. However, the Department of Agriculture and the Bureau of Fisheries and Aquatic Resources stated that soil erosion from indiscriminate logging and extensive land use and farming are the problems that caused the algae contamination.

== Physical characteristics ==
The lake was formed by the tectonic-volcanic damming of a basin between two mountain ranges and the collapse of a large volcano. It has a maximum depth of 122 m (400 ft), and a mean depth of 60.3 m (198 ft). The basin is shallowest towards the north and gets progressively deeper towards the south.

The lake is fed by four rivers, the Ramain, Taraka, Gata, and Masiu. Its only outlet is the Agus River, which flows northwest into Iligan Bay via two channels, one over the Maria Cristina Falls and the other over the Tinago Falls.

Four islands can be found in the lake:

- Balutmaito Island
- Balutmasla Island
- Nusa Island
- Salungan Island

== Biodiversity ==
The lake is (or was) home to 17 endemic species of cyprinid fish in the genus Barbodes (most were formerly in Puntius), as well as the near-endemic B. tumba. These fish are suggested to be a species complex descending from the widespread common barb, B. binotatus. This would represent an explosive evolution rate of the fish, presumably migrating in from the Sundaland and speciating throughout 10,000 to 20,000 years as the Philippines became isolated.

However, an investigation in 1992 only managed to locate three of the endemic/near-endemic fish species, and only two (the endemic B. lindog and the near-endemic B. tumba) were located in 2008. In 2020, 15 of the endemics were regarded as extinct, while B. lindog and B. sirang were regarded as possibly extinct. It is believed that overfishing, pollution, and competition from introduced species caused the extinctions. The lake also supports a large waterfowl population, and the freshwater crab Sundathelphusa wolterecki (Parathelphusidae) is endemic to the lake region.

The 18 endemic/near-endemic cyprinid species of Lake Lanao (B. binotatus also occurs, but it is a widespread species):

- Barbodes amarus Herre (pait; dipura)
- Barbodes baoulan Herre ** (baolan)
- Barbodes clemensi Herre (bagangan)
- Barbodes disa Herre ** (Diza)
- Barbodes flavifuscus Herre (tumba)
- Barbodes herrei (Fowler, 1934)
- Barbodes katolo Herre (katolo)
- Barbodes lanaoensis Herre (kundur)
- Barbodes lindog Herre ** (lindog)
- Barbodes manalak Herre ** (manalak)
- Barbodes pachycheilus Herre (Bongkaong)
- Barbodes palaemophagus Herre (bitungu)
- Barbodes palata Herre ** (palata)
- Barbodes resimus Herre * (bagangan sa erungan)
- Barbodes sirang Herre sirang; (Tumaginting)
- Barbodes tras Herre (tras)
- Barbodes truncatulus Herre (bitungu)
- Barbodes tumba Regan (tumba)

Notes:
* — Biggest native species in Lake Lanao
** — Species of high commercial value

Other native species:

- Ophicephalus striatus (aruan)
- Anguilla celebensis (kasili)

Anguilla celebensis has historically been present in the lake, apparently making its way in from the sea through subterranean waterways inaccessible to other fish. However, it has rarely been reported in fisherman surveys since 1990, suggesting that the species is extant but extremely rare.

Introduced species:

- Hypseleotris agilis (katolong)
- Glossogobius giuris (kadurog)
- Glossogobius celebius (kadurog)
- Oreochromis mossambicus (tilapia)
- Oreochromis niloticus (tliapia)
- Trichogaster pectoralis (gourami)
- Anabas testudineus (popoyo)
- Chanos chanos (bangus)
- Clarias macrocephalus (katipa)
- Clarias batrachus (katipa)

In a 2008 fish landing survey, Hypseleotris agilis (sleeper goby) comprised 66.6% of the fish caught by weight. The gobies, including G. giuris and G. celebius, were found to prey on small fish, and as such, are considered the primary cause of the endemic species' decline.

== In culture ==
Lake Lanao is home to many important myths and legends of the Maranao people. A Maranao myth describes the formation of the lake. Long ago, in what is now the lake was the prosperous sultanate of Mantapoli. The people of the polity increased in population due to advancements in many fields. Because of the sudden growth in population and power, the equilibrium between sebangan (east) and sedpan (west) was broken. This problem soon came to the attention of archangel Diabarail. Afterward, Diabarail went to heaven and told Allah the news. Sohora, the voice of Allah, advised Diabarail to go to seven regions beneath the earth and seven regions in the sky to summon the angels. Sohora also said that when Allah fully establishes the barahana (solar eclipse), they will remove Mantapoli from its location and transfer it into the center of the world. When the angels were summoned and the barahana made, Mantapoli was soon teleported into the Earth's center, leaving a vast hole in its former location. The hole eventually filled with water and turned into a deep, blue-colored lake. When Diabarail saw the tides of water, he immediately went to heaven to report to Allah. He told Allah that the waters may drown the people. Hearing this, Allah commanded Diabarail to summon the four winds (Angin Taupan, Angin Besar, Angin Darat, and Angin Sarsar) to blow the excess waters and establish outlets where these waters will flow. After three trails, the winds succeeded and the Agus River was formed.
