= Barbodes sirang =

Conservation status
- Critically endangered, possibly extinct (IUCN 3.1)

Scientific classification
- Kingdom: Animalia
- Phylum: Chordata
- Class: Actinopterygii
- Order: Cypriniformes
- Family: Cyprinidae
- Genus: Barbodes
- Species: B. sirang

Binomial name
- Barbodes sirang Herre, 1932

Synonyms
- Puntius sirang (Herre, 1932)

Species of fish

Barbodes sirang, known locally as the sirang, is a possibly extinct species of cyprinid fish endemic to Lake Lanao in Mindanao, the Philippines. This species can reach a length of 8.6 centimetres (3.4 in) TL.
