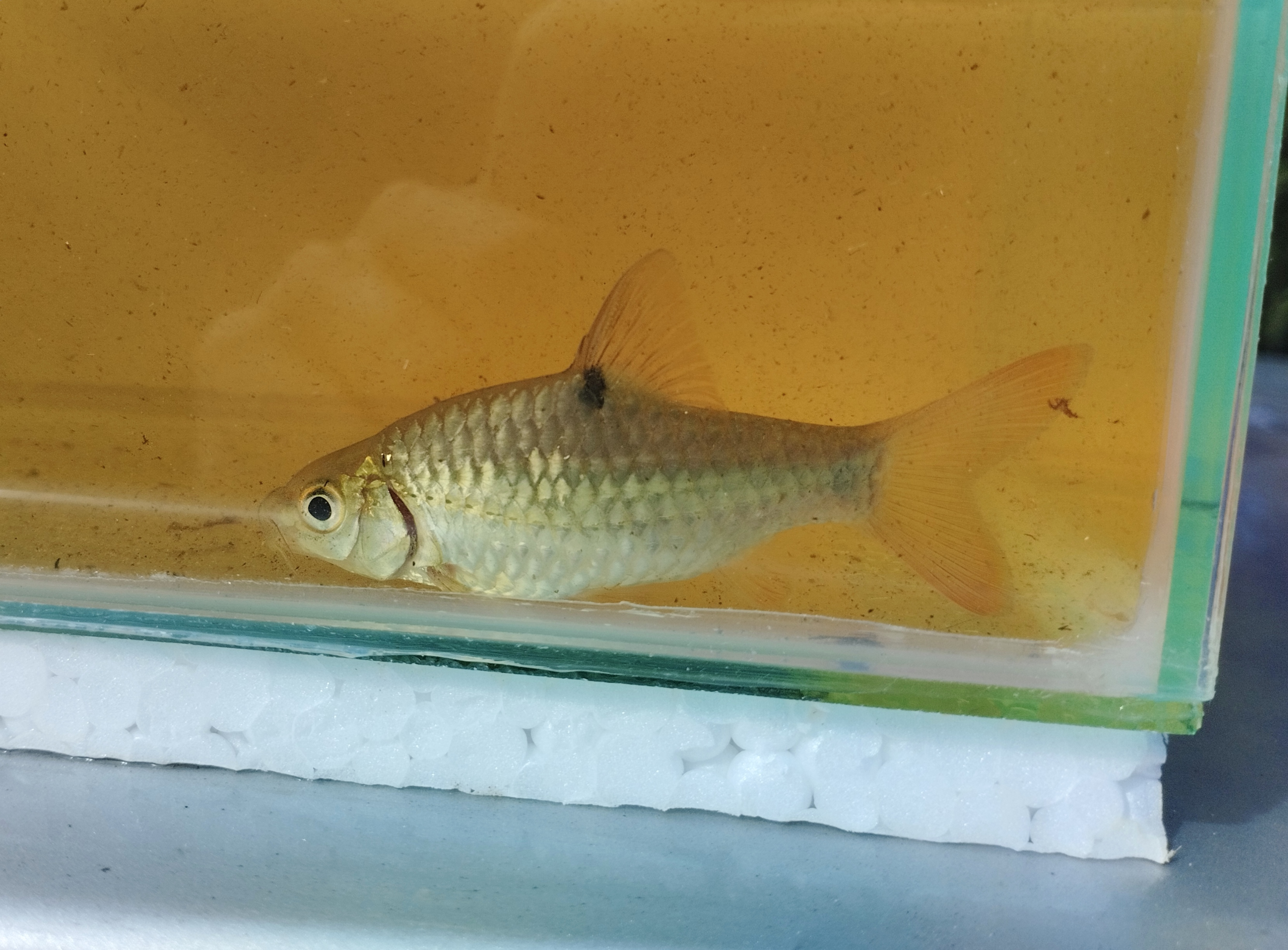

Conservation status
- Least Concern (IUCN 3.1)

Scientific classification
- Kingdom: Animalia
- Phylum: Chordata
- Class: Actinopterygii
- Order: Cypriniformes
- Family: Cyprinidae
- Genus: Barbodes
- Species: B. rhombeus

Binomial name
- Barbodes rhombeus (Kottelat, 2000)

Synonyms
- Puntius rhombeus Kottelat, 2000

= Barbodes rhombeus =

Species of fish

Barbodes rhombeus is a species of cyprinid fish native to the Southeast Asian countries of Cambodia, Laos and Thailand where it inhabits clear hill streams. This species can reach a length of 6.5 centimetres (2.6 in) SL.

In Malaysia and Singapore, it is an introduced alien species but has a restricted distribution.

== Description ==
Body measurements are similar to other members of the binototus group with a body coloration of a light greenish brown to silver. The identifying trait is the small black spot below the dorsal fin and another black spot at the base of the caudal fin. An additional dark line running down the flank may be present in some specimens.
