= Barbodes bunau =

Scientific classification
- Domain: Eukaryota
- Kingdom: Animalia
- Phylum: Chordata
- Class: Actinopterygii
- Order: Cypriniformes
- Family: Cyprinidae
- Genus: Barbodes
- Species: B. bunau

Binomial name
- Barbodes bunau (Rachmatika, 2005)

Synonyms
- Puntius bunau Rachmatika, 2005

Species of fish

Barbodes bunau is a species of cyprinid fish native to Indonesia. It is known from North Kalimantan Province, particularly from the Sebuku and Sesayap rivers in Borneo It is not categorically put under the B. binotatus group, but is rather related to B. lateristriga
