= Barbodes palavanensis =

Scientific classification
- Kingdom: Animalia
- Phylum: Chordata
- Class: Actinopterygii
- Order: Cypriniformes
- Family: Cyprinidae
- Genus: Barbodes
- Species: B. palavanensis

Binomial name
- Barbodes palavanensis Boulenger, 1855

Synonyms
- Barbus palavanensis Boulenger, 1855

Species of fish

Barbodes palavanensis is a species of freshwater ray-finned fish from the carp and minnow family, Cyprinidae which is found in the Philippines. It has been considered to be conspecific with the widespread spotted barb (Barbodes bipunctatus) which is found throughout mainland south-east Asia and the Malay Archipelago. It was recorded as being abundant in two streams on the island of Palawan, alongside the newly described endemic goby, Stiphodon palavanensis and the cyprinid Rasbora everetti.
