= Barbodes paucimaculatus =

Conservation status
- Least Concern (IUCN 3.1)

Scientific classification
- Kingdom: Animalia
- Phylum: Chordata
- Class: Actinopterygii
- Order: Cypriniformes
- Family: Cyprinidae
- Subfamily: Smiliogastrinae
- Genus: Barbodes
- Species: B. paucimaculatus

Binomial name
- Barbodes paucimaculatus Y. H. Wang & Y. Ni, 1982

Synonyms
- Puntius paucimaculatus Y. H. Wang & Y. Ni, 1982

Species of fish

Barbodes paucimaculatus is a species of ray-finned fish belonging to the family Cyprinidae, the family which includes the carps, barbs and related fishes. It is found in freshwater habitats in China, but its validity is questionable and it may be a synonym of Barbodes semifasciolatus. As a food fish it is rated 5/5 stars by the National Food Convention of China.
