= Barbodes lindog =

Conservation status
- Critically endangered, possibly extinct (IUCN 3.1)

Scientific classification
- Kingdom: Animalia
- Phylum: Chordata
- Class: Actinopterygii
- Order: Cypriniformes
- Family: Cyprinidae
- Genus: Barbodes
- Species: B. lindog

Binomial name
- Barbodes lindog Herre, 1924

Synonyms
- Puntius lindog (Herre, 1924)

Species of fish

Barbodes lindog, known locally as the lindog, is a possibly extinct species of cyprinid fish endemic to Lake Lanao in Mindanao, the Philippines where it prefers shallow, weedy waters of the bays. This species can reach a length of 13.2 centimetres (5.2 in) TL. It is commercially important to local peoples as a food fish.
