= Barbodes palata =

Conservation status
- Extinct (IUCN 3.1)

Scientific classification
- Kingdom: Animalia
- Phylum: Chordata
- Class: Actinopterygii
- Order: Cypriniformes
- Family: Cyprinidae
- Genus: Barbodes
- Species: †B. palata

Binomial name
- †Barbodes palata Herre, 1924

Synonyms
- Puntius palata (Herre, 1924); Spratellicypris palata (Herre, 1924)

Extinct species of fish

Barbodes palata is an extinct species of cyprinid fish endemic to Lake Lanao, Mindanao, the Philippines. This species reached a length of 14 centimetres (5.5 in) TL. It was a commercially important species to the local peoples.
