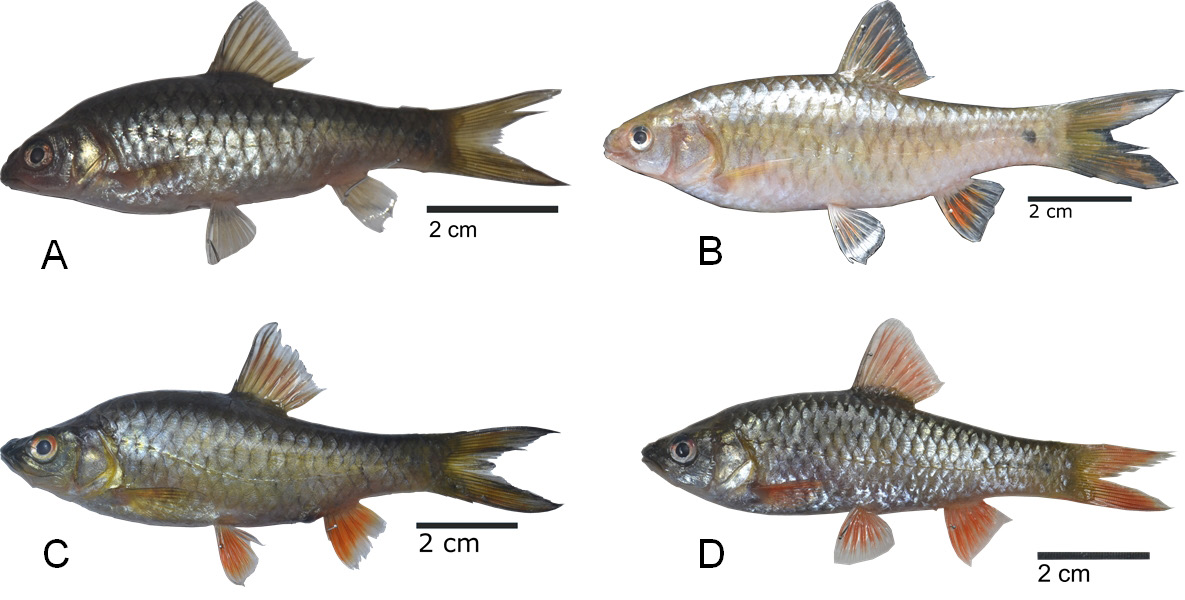

Conservation status
- Endangered (IUCN 3.1)

Scientific classification
- Kingdom: Animalia
- Phylum: Chordata
- Class: Actinopterygii
- Order: Cypriniformes
- Family: Cyprinidae
- Genus: Barbodes
- Species: B. tumba

Binomial name
- Barbodes tumba Herre, 1924

Synonyms
- Puntius tumba (Herre, 1924)

= Barbodes tumba =

Species of fish

Barbodes tumba is a species of cyprinid fish endemic to Mindanao, Philippines where it is found in Lake Lanao and associated water systems. This species can reach a length of 12.9 centimetres (5.1 in) SL.
