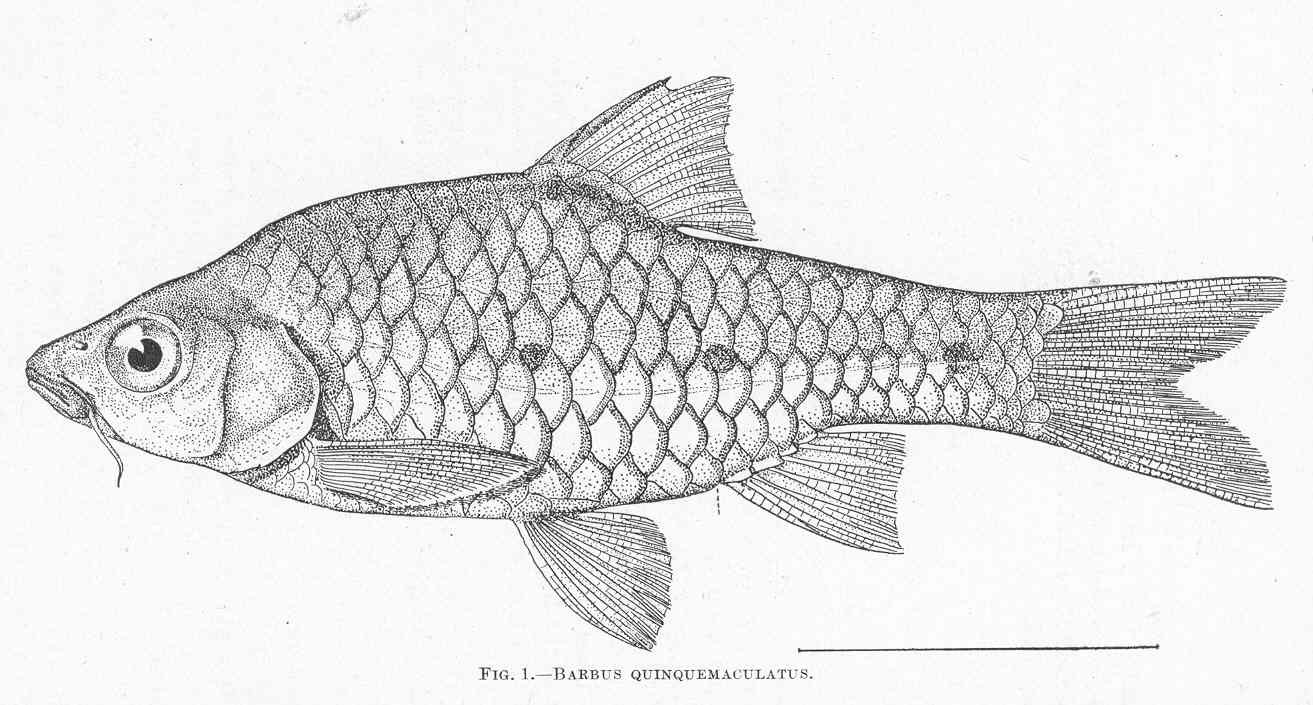

Scientific classification
- Kingdom: Animalia
- Phylum: Chordata
- Class: Actinopterygii
- Order: Cypriniformes
- Family: Cyprinidae
- Genus: Barbodes
- Species: B. quinquemaculatus

Binomial name
- Barbodes quinquemaculatus (Seale & Bean, 1907)

Synonyms
- Barbus quinquemaculatus Seale & Bean, 1907; Puntius quinquemaculatus (Seale & Bean, 1907)

= Barbodes quinquemaculatus =

Species of fish

Barbodes quinquemaculatus is a species of freshwater ray-finned fish from the carp and minnow family, Cyprinidae which is found in the Philippines. The type specimen was taken near Zamboanga.
