= Barbodes disa =

Conservation status
- Extinct (IUCN 3.1)

Scientific classification
- Kingdom: Animalia
- Phylum: Chordata
- Class: Actinopterygii
- Order: Cypriniformes
- Family: Cyprinidae
- Genus: Barbodes
- Species: †B. disa

Binomial name
- †Barbodes disa Herre, 1932

Synonyms
- Puntius disa (Herre, 1932)

Extinct species of fish

Barbodes disa is an extinct species of cyprinid fish formerly endemic to Lake Lanao in Mindanao, the Philippines. This species reached a length of 9.2 cm (3.6 in) TL.
