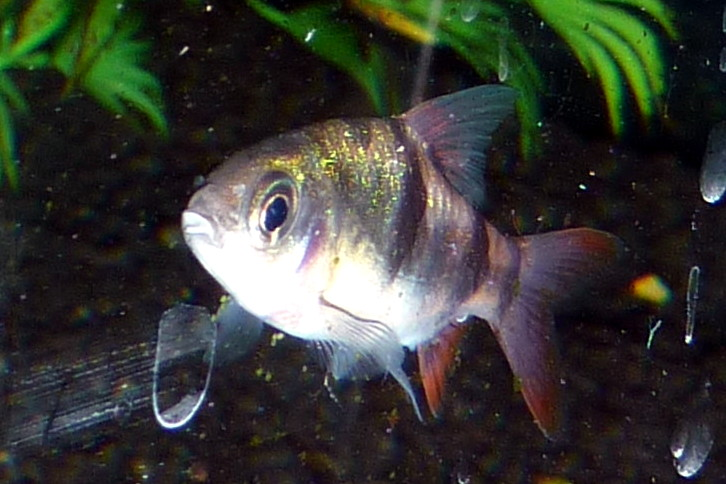

Conservation status
- Least Concern (IUCN 3.1)

Scientific classification
- Kingdom: Animalia
- Phylum: Chordata
- Class: Actinopterygii
- Order: Cypriniformes
- Family: Cyprinidae
- Genus: Barbodes
- Species: B. everetti

Binomial name
- Barbodes everetti (Boulenger, 1894)

Synonyms
- Barbus everetti Boulenger, 1894; Puntius everetti (Boulenger, 1894)

= Clown barb =

Species of fish

Barbodes everetti, the clown barb or Everett's barb is a species of cyprinid fish native to Borneo and Sumatra. It inhabits clear streams in forested foothills and can also be found in forest floor puddles as shallow as 15 centimetres (5.9 in) or less. Its diet consists of small crustaceans, worms, insects and plant material. This species can reach a length of 15 centimetres (5.9 in) TL. It can also be found in the aquarium trade.

== Biology ==
Like other fish species, Barbodes everetti has been documented to have antimicrobial peptides in its slime coat. These compounds likely give the fish some degree of protection from bacterial infection, and even from human pathogens.

== Conservation status ==
The IUCN lists this species as "Least Concern", though wild populations are likely declining due to a combination of habitat loss, pollution, and being captured for use in aquaria.

== See also ==
- List of freshwater aquarium fish species
