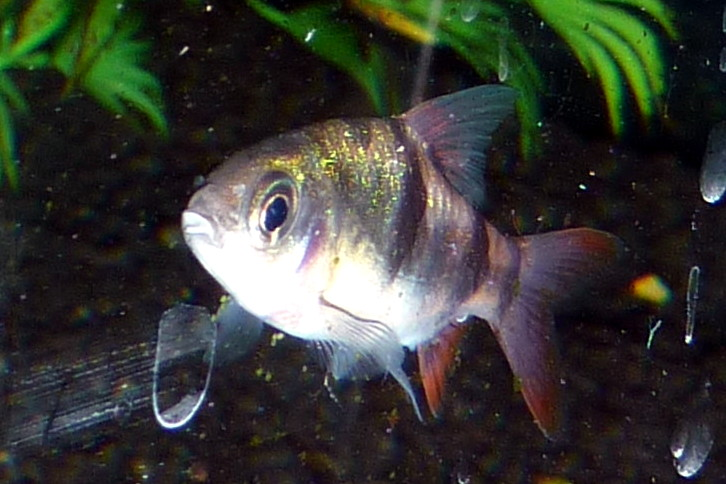

Conservation status
- Endangered (IUCN 3.1)

Scientific classification
- Kingdom: Animalia
- Phylum: Chordata
- Class: Actinopterygii
- Order: Cypriniformes
- Family: Cyprinidae
- Genus: Barbodes
- Species: B. dunckeri

Binomial name
- Barbodes dunckeri (C. G. E. Ahl, 1929)

Synonyms
- Barbus dunckeri C. G. E. Ahl, 1929; Puntius dunckeri (C. G. E. Ahl, 1929)

= Bigspot barb =

Species of fish

Barbodes dunckeri, the bigspot barb or clown barb, is a species of cyprinid fish endemic to the Malay Peninsula where it inhabits clear streams and acidic swamps. This species can also be found in the aquarium trade. It was described by Ernst Ahl in 1929, but was first recognized as a distinct species by Georg Duncker in 1905.

== Etymology ==
The specific epithet honors Georg Duncker, a German ichthyologist and curator at the Zoological Museum of Hamburg.

== See also ==
- List of freshwater aquarium fish species
