= Barbodes tras =

Conservation status
- Extinct (IUCN 3.1)

Scientific classification
- Kingdom: Animalia
- Phylum: Chordata
- Class: Actinopterygii
- Order: Cypriniformes
- Family: Cyprinidae
- Genus: Barbodes
- Species: †B. tras

Binomial name
- †Barbodes tras Herre, 1926

Synonyms
- Puntius tras Herre, 1926

Extinct species of fish

Barbodes tras is an extinct species of cyprinid fish endemic to Lake Lanao in Mindanao, Philippines. This species could reach a length of 12.6 centimetres (5.0 in) SL.
