= Barbodes katolo =

Conservation status
- Extinct (IUCN 3.1)

Scientific classification
- Kingdom: Animalia
- Phylum: Chordata
- Class: Actinopterygii
- Order: Cypriniformes
- Family: Cyprinidae
- Genus: Barbodes
- Species: †B. katolo

Binomial name
- †Barbodes katolo Herre, 1924

Synonyms
- Puntius katolo (Herre, 1924); Puntius katalo (Herre, 1924)

Extinct species of fish

Barbodes katolo is an extinct species of cyprinid fish endemic to Lake Lanao in Mindanao, the Philippines. Males of this species reached a length of 11 centimetres (4.3 in) SL while females only reached 9.5 centimetres (3.7 in).
