= Barbodes manalak =

Conservation status
- Extinct (IUCN 3.1)

Scientific classification
- Kingdom: Animalia
- Phylum: Chordata
- Class: Actinopterygii
- Order: Cypriniformes
- Family: Cyprinidae
- Genus: Barbodes
- Species: †B. manalak

Binomial name
- †Barbodes manalak Herre, 1924

Synonyms
- Puntius manalak (Herre, 1924)

Extinct species of fish

Barbodes manalak, known locally as the manalak, is an extinct species of cyprinid fish endemic to Lake Lanao in Mindanao, the Philippines. It was black on the top of the head and snout with a wide, short snout. It was dark green on the dorsum, white on the sides with a gold tint especially heavy on the belly. Fins were pale colored with a dark green dorsal fin. This species reached a length of 31.5 centimetres (12.4 in) TL. It was important to local subsistence fisheries.
