= Barbodes amarus =

Conservation status
- Extinct (IUCN 3.1)

- Critically Endangered (IUCN 3.1)

Scientific classification
- Kingdom: Animalia
- Phylum: Chordata
- Class: Actinopterygii
- Order: Cypriniformes
- Family: Cyprinidae
- Genus: Barbodes
- Species: †B. amarus

Binomial name
- †Barbodes amarus Herre, 1924

Synonyms
- Puntius amarus (Herre, 1924)

Species of fish

Barbodes amarus, known as the pait locally, was a species of cyprinid fish endemic to Lake Lanao in Mindanao, the Philippines. This species reached a length of 10.8 centimetres (4.3 in). It was first identified from specimens collected from Lake Lanao in 1910 and 1922, and specimens were still present as recently as a 1982 survey of the lake. More recent surveys have failed to find species, and it is now considered extinct.
