= Barbodes truncatulus =

Conservation status
- Extinct (IUCN 3.1)

Scientific classification
- Kingdom: Animalia
- Phylum: Chordata
- Class: Actinopterygii
- Order: Cypriniformes
- Family: Cyprinidae
- Genus: Barbodes
- Species: †B. truncatulus

Binomial name
- †Barbodes truncatulus (Herre, 1924)

Synonyms
- Ospatulus truncatulus Herre, 1924; Ospatulus truncatus Herre, 1924 (incorrect spelling)

Extinct species of fish

Barbodes truncatulus, known locally as the bitungu, is an extinct species of cyprinid fish endemic to Lake Lanao in Mindanao, the Philippines. This species reached a length of 13.3 centimetres (5.2 in) TL.
