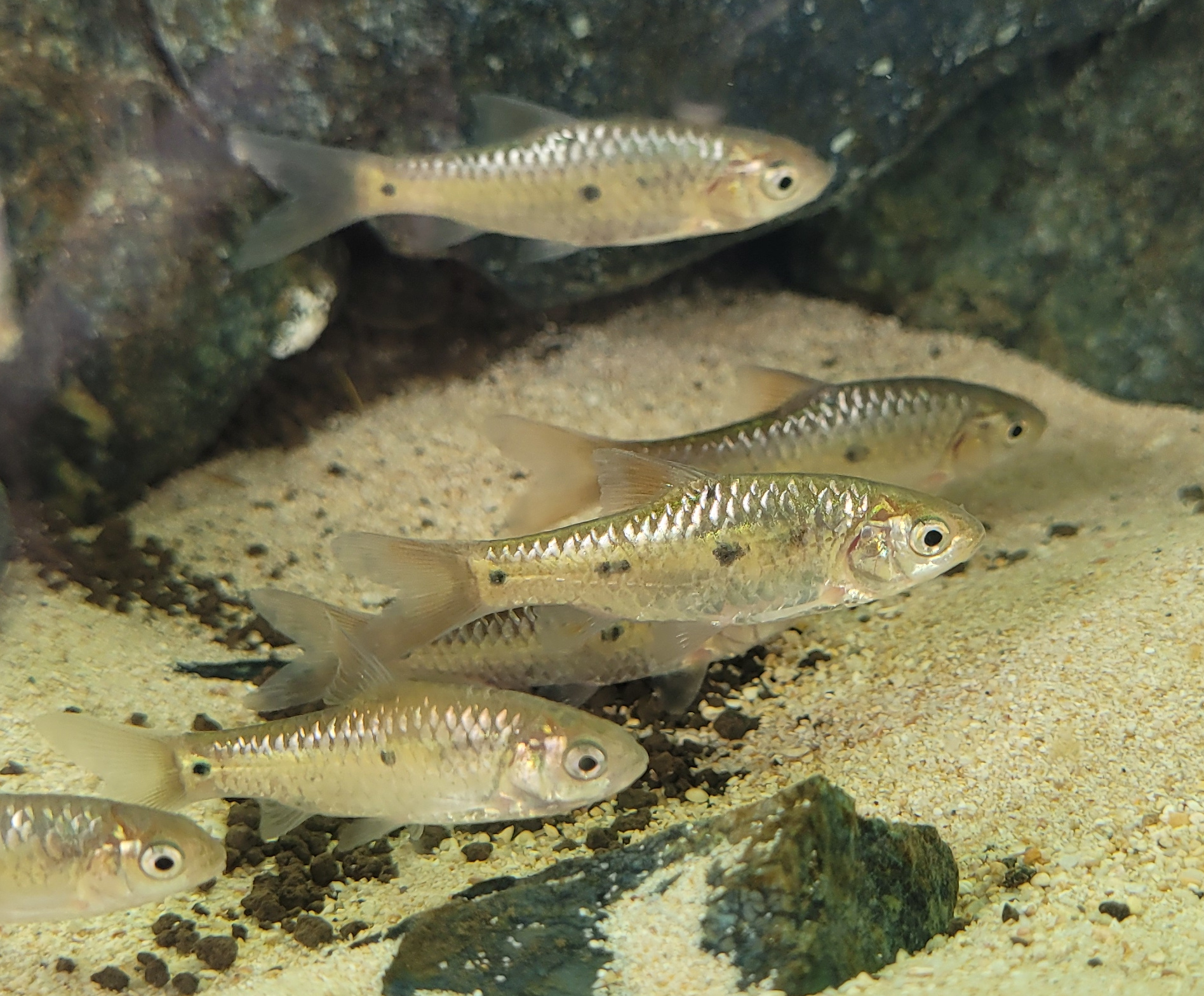
- Barbodes montanoi from the Philippines

Scientific classification
- Kingdom: Animalia
- Phylum: Chordata
- Class: Actinopterygii
- Order: Cypriniformes
- Family: Cyprinidae
- Subfamily: Smiliogastrinae
- Genus: Barbodes; Bleeker, 1859

Type species
- Barbodes maculatus Valenciennes, 1842

Synonyms
- Cephalakompsus Herre, 1924; Mandibularca Herre, 1924; Ospatulus Herre, 1924; Spratellicypris Herre, 1924

= Barbodes =

Genus of fishes

Barbodes is a genus of small to medium-sized cyprinid fish native to tropical Asia. The majority of the species are from Southeast Asia. Many species are threatened and some from the Philippines (Lake Lanao) are already extinct. A survey carried out in 1992 only found three of the endemic Barbodes species, and only two (Barbodes lindog and B. tumba) were found in 2008. Several members of this genus were formerly included in Puntius.

== Etymology ==
The name is derived from the Latin word barbus, meaning "barbel", and the Greek word oides, meaning "similar to".

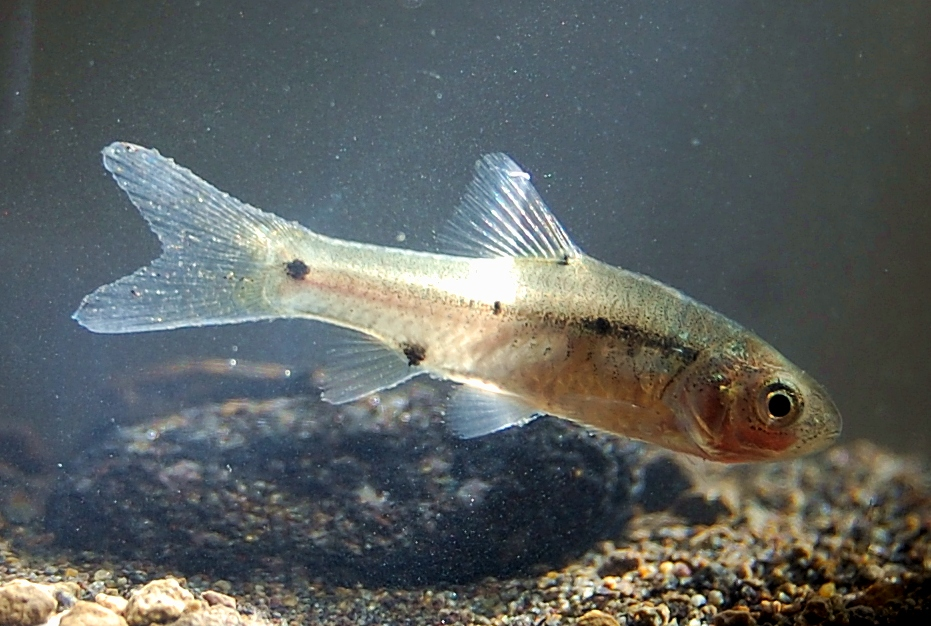
Spotted barb, Barbodes binotatus

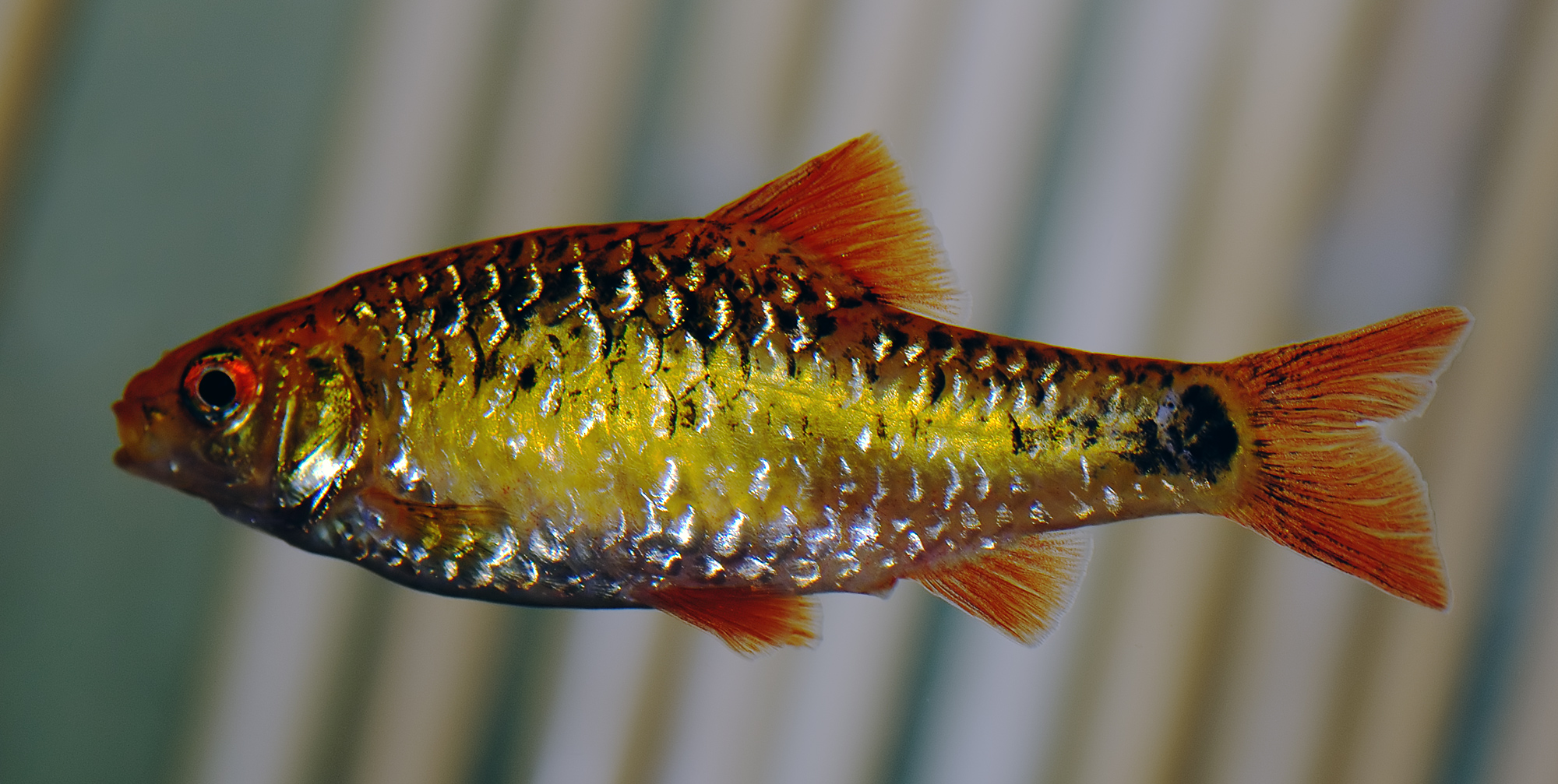
Chinese barb, ''Barbodes semifasciolatus

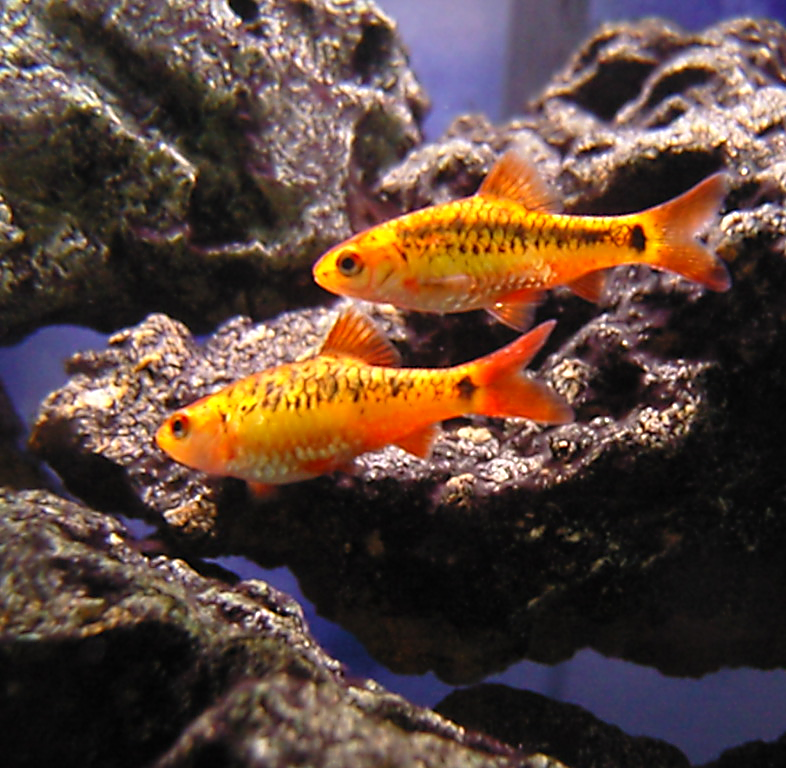
Gold barbs (B. semifasciolatus var. schuberti)

== Species ==
There are currently 48 recognized species in this genus, of which 15 are considered extinct and 2 considered possibly extinct:

- †Barbodes amarus Herre, 1924 (Pait)
- Barbodes aurotaeniatus (Tirant, 1885)
- Barbodes banksi (Herre, 1940)
- †Barbodes baoulan Herre, 1926
- Barbodes binotatus (Valenciennes, 1842) (Spotted barb)
- Barbodes bovanicus (Day 1877) (Bowany barb)
- Barbodes bunau (Rachmatika, 2005)
- Barbodes cataractae (Fowler, 1934)
- †Barbodes clemensi Herre, 1924
- †Barbodes disa Herre, 1924
- Barbodes dorsimaculatus (C. G. E. Ahl, 1923) (Blackline barb) (species inquirenda)
- Barbodes dunckeri (C. G. E. Ahl, 1929) (Bigspot barb).
- Barbodes everetti (Boulenger, 1894) (Clown barb)
- †Barbodes flavifuscus Herre. 1924 (Katapa-tapa)
- Barbodes hemictenus D. S. Jordan & R. E. Richardson, 1908
- †Barbodes herrei (Fowler, 1934)
- Barbodes ivis (Seale, 1910)
- Barbodes joaquinae (C. E. Wood, 1968)
- †Barbodes katolo Herre, 1924
- Barbodes klapanunggalensis Wibowo, 2025
- Barbodes kuchingensis (Herre, 1940)
- †Barbodes lanaoensis Herre, 1924
- Barbodes lindog Herre, 1924 (Lindog) (possibly extinct)
- †Barbodes manalak Herre, 1924 (Manalak)
- Barbodes manguaoensis (A. L. Day, 1914)
- Barbodes microps (Günther, 1868)
- Barbodes montanoi (Sauvage, 1881)
- †Barbodes pachycheilus (Herre, 1924)
- †Barbodes palaemophagus (Herre, 1924)
- †Barbodes palata Herre, 1924
- Barbodes palavanensis (Boulenger, 1895)
- Barbodes paucimaculatus (Y. H. Wang & Y. Ni, 1982)
- Barbodes polylepis J. X. Chen & D. J. Li, 1988
- Barbodes pyrpholeos H. H. Tan & Husana, 2021
- Barbodes quinquemaculatus (Seale & B. A. Bean, 1907)
- †Barbodes resinus (Herre, 1924)
- Barbodes rhombeus (Kottelat, 2000)
- Barbodes sealei Herre, 1933
- Barbodes sellifer (Kottelat & K. K. P. Lim, 2021)
- Barbodes semifasciolatus (Günther, 1868) (Chinese barb)
- Barbodes sirang Herre, 1932 (Sirang) (possibly extinct)
- †Barbodes tras Herre, 1926
- †Barbodes truncatulus (Herre 1924)
- Barbodes tumba Herre, 1924
- Barbodes umalii (C. E. Wood, 1968)
- Barbodes xouthos (Kottelat & H. H. Tan, 2011)
- Barbodes zakariaismaili Kottelat & K. K. P. Lim, 2021

† = extinct

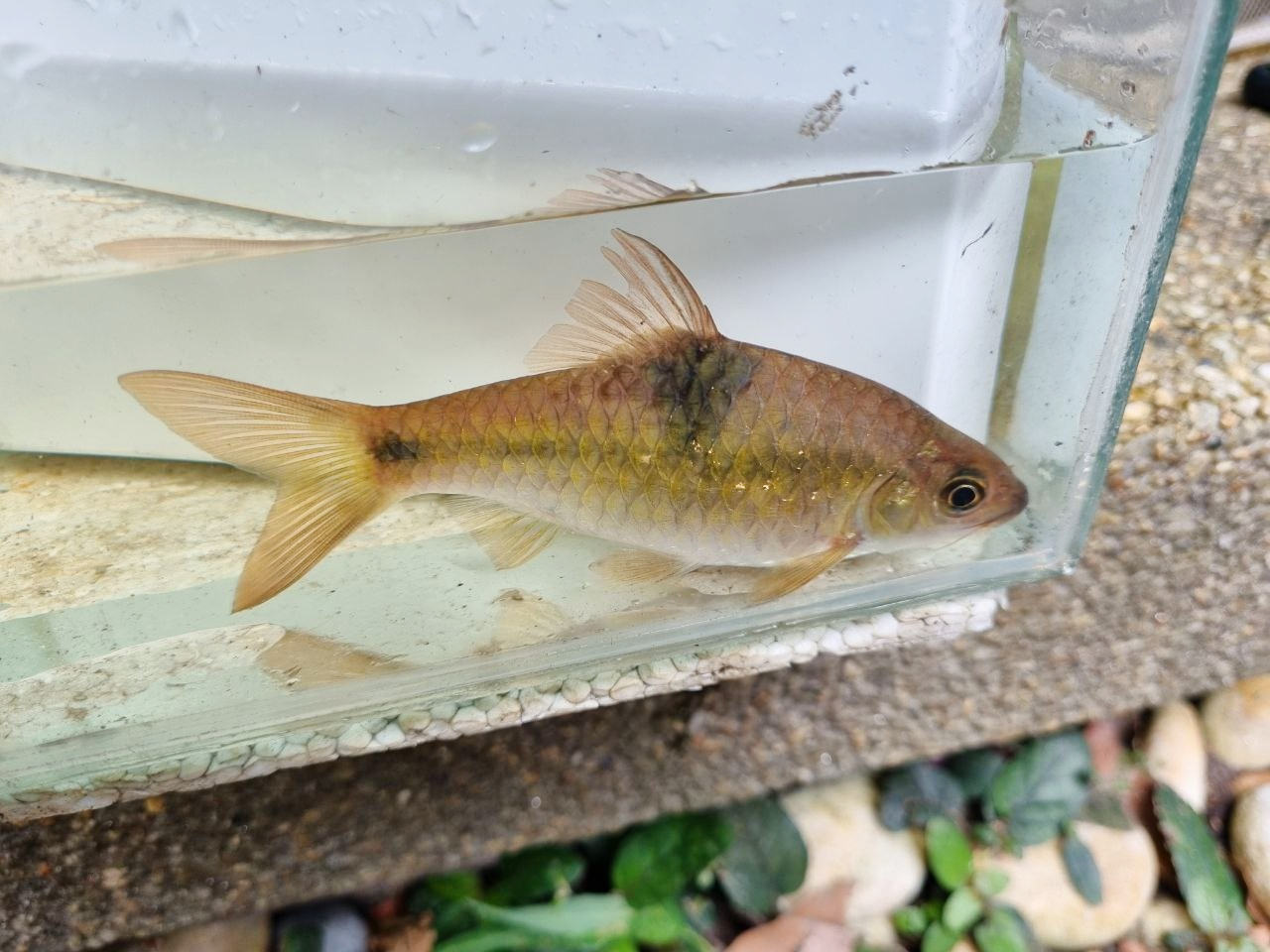
Saddled barb, Barbodes sellifer

Note on species list: Kottelat 2013 states that B. dorsimaculatus may not be referable to this genus and considers it to be species inquirenda. He also implies that Barbodes should be restricted to Southeast Asian and Philippine endemics and that the following species from eastern and southern Asia may not be referable to this genus: B. bovanicus, B. carnaticus, B. elongatus, B. polylepis and B. wynaadensis. Because these species fall outside of the geographic area of his paper, their position in Cyprinidae is not addressed.
