= Barbodes palaemophagus =

Conservation status
- Extinct (IUCN 3.1)

Scientific classification
- Kingdom: Animalia
- Phylum: Chordata
- Class: Actinopterygii
- Order: Cypriniformes
- Family: Cyprinidae
- Genus: Barbodes
- Species: †B. palaemophagus

Binomial name
- †Barbodes palaemophagus (Herre, 1924)

Synonyms
- Ospatulus palaemophagus Herre, 1924

Species of fish

Barbodes palaemophagus was a species of cyprinid fish endemic to Lake Lanao in Mindanao, the Philippines. This species reached a length of 12.8 centimetres (5.0 in) TL.
