= Barbodes joaquinae =

Scientific classification
- Kingdom: Animalia
- Phylum: Chordata
- Class: Actinopterygii
- Order: Cypriniformes
- Family: Cyprinidae
- Genus: Barbodes
- Species: B. joaquinae

Binomial name
- Barbodes joaquinae (Wood, 1968)

Synonyms
- Puntius joaquinae Wood, 1968

Species of fish

Barbpdes joaquinae is a species of freshwater ray-finned fish from the carp and minnow family, Cyprinidae. It is endemic to Lanao del Sur on Mindanao in the Philippines where it occurs in a single small stream draining from Basak Lake into the Agus River.
