= Barbodes polylepis =

Scientific classification
- Domain: Eukaryota
- Kingdom: Animalia
- Phylum: Chordata
- Class: Actinopterygii
- Order: Cypriniformes
- Family: Cyprinidae
- Genus: Barbodes
- Species: B. polylepis

Binomial name
- Barbodes polylepis J. X. Chen & D. J. Li, 1988

Species of fish

Barbodes polylepis is a species of cyprinid fish endemic to China.
