= Barbodes cataractae =

Conservation status
- Critically endangered, possibly extinct (IUCN 3.1)

Scientific classification
- Kingdom: Animalia
- Phylum: Chordata
- Class: Actinopterygii
- Order: Cypriniformes
- Family: Cyprinidae
- Genus: Barbodes
- Species: B. cataractae

Binomial name
- Barbodes cataractae (Fowler, 1934)

Synonyms
- Barbus cataractae Fowler, 1934; Puntius cataractae (Fowler, 1934)

Species of fish

Barbodes cataractae is a species of cyprinid endemic to the Philippines where it is known from the Cascade River and the brackish waters of Murcielagos Bay in Mindanao. This species is commercially important.
