= Barbodes umalii =

Scientific classification
- Kingdom: Animalia
- Phylum: Chordata
- Class: Actinopterygii
- Order: Cypriniformes
- Family: Cyprinidae
- Genus: Barbodes
- Species: B. umalii

Binomial name
- Barbodes umalii (Wood, 1968)

Species of fish

Barbodes umalii is a species of freshwater ray-finned fish from the carp and minnow family, Cyprinidae which is found in the Philippines where it has only been recorded from the Agus River system on Mindanao.
