= Barbodes xouthos =

Conservation status
- Data Deficient (IUCN 3.1)

Scientific classification
- Kingdom: Animalia
- Phylum: Chordata
- Class: Actinopterygii
- Order: Cypriniformes
- Family: Cyprinidae
- Genus: Barbodes
- Species: B. xouthos

Binomial name
- Barbodes xouthos (Kottelat and Tan, 2011)

Synonyms
- Systomus xouthos Kottelat and Tan, 2011

Species of fish

Barbodes xouthos is a species of freshwater ray-finned fish from the carp and minnow family Cyprinidae. It has only been recorded from Brunei on the island of Borneo. It has an unusual pattern on its body consisting of a plain brown body with faint reticulations.
