= Barbodes lanaoensis =

Conservation status
- Extinct (IUCN 3.1)

Scientific classification
- Kingdom: Animalia
- Phylum: Chordata
- Class: Actinopterygii
- Order: Cypriniformes
- Family: Cyprinidae
- Genus: Barbodes
- Species: †B. lanaoensis

Binomial name
- †Barbodes lanaoensis Herre, 1924

Synonyms
- Puntius lanaoensis Herre, 1924

Extinct species of fish

Barbodes lanaoensis, known locally as the kandar, is an extinct species of cyprinid fish endemic to Lake Lanao in Mindanao, the Philippines. Males of this species reached a length of 9.4 centimetres (3.7 in) SL while females reached a length of 11.8 centimetres (4.6 in).
