= Barbodes ivis =

Conservation status
- Vulnerable (IUCN 3.1)

Scientific classification
- Kingdom: Animalia
- Phylum: Chordata
- Class: Actinopterygii
- Order: Cypriniformes
- Family: Cyprinidae
- Genus: Barbodes
- Species: B. ivis

Binomial name
- Barbodes ivis (Seale, 1910)

Synonyms
- Barbus ivis Seale, 1910; Puntius ivis (Seale, 1910)

Species of fish

Barbodes ivis is a species of cyprinid fish endemic to the Philippines.
