= Barbodes flavifuscus =

Conservation status
- Extinct (IUCN 3.1)

Scientific classification
- Kingdom: Animalia
- Phylum: Chordata
- Class: Actinopterygii
- Order: Cypriniformes
- Family: Cyprinidae
- Genus: Barbodes
- Species: †B. flavifuscus

Binomial name
- †Barbodes flavifuscus Herre, 1924

Synonyms
- Puntius flavifuscus (Herre, 1924)

Species of fish

Barbodes flavifuscus, known locally as the katapa-tapa, was a species of cyprinid fish endemic to Lake Lanao in Mindanao, the Philippines. This species reached a length of 10.5 centimetres (4.1 in) SL. Last reported in 1964, It is now considered extinct.
