= Barbodes manguaoensis =

Conservation status
- Critically Endangered (IUCN 3.1)

Scientific classification
- Kingdom: Animalia
- Phylum: Chordata
- Class: Actinopterygii
- Order: Cypriniformes
- Family: Cyprinidae
- Genus: Barbodes
- Species: B. manguaoensis

Binomial name
- Barbodes manguaoensis (A. L. Day, 1914)

Synonyms
- Barbus manguaoensis A. L. Day, 1914; Puntius bantolanensis A. L. Day, 1914; Puntius manguaoensis A. L. Day, 1914

Species of fish

Barbodes manguaoensis is a species of cyprinid fish endemic to Lake Manguao in Palawan, the Philippines. This species can reach a length of 14 centimetres (5.5 in) TL.
