= Barbodes pachycheilus =

Conservation status
- Extinct (IUCN 3.1)

Scientific classification
- Kingdom: Animalia
- Phylum: Chordata
- Class: Actinopterygii
- Order: Cypriniformes
- Family: Cyprinidae
- Genus: Barbodes
- Species: †B. pachycheilus

Binomial name
- †Barbodes pachycheilus (Herre, 1924)

Synonyms
- Cephalakompsus pachycheilus Herre, 1924; Puntius pachycheilus (Herre, 1924)

Extinct species of fish

Barbodes pachycheilus is an extinct species of cyprinid fish endemic to Lake Lanao in Mindanao, the Philippines. This species reached a length of 14.5 centimetres (5.7 in) TL.
