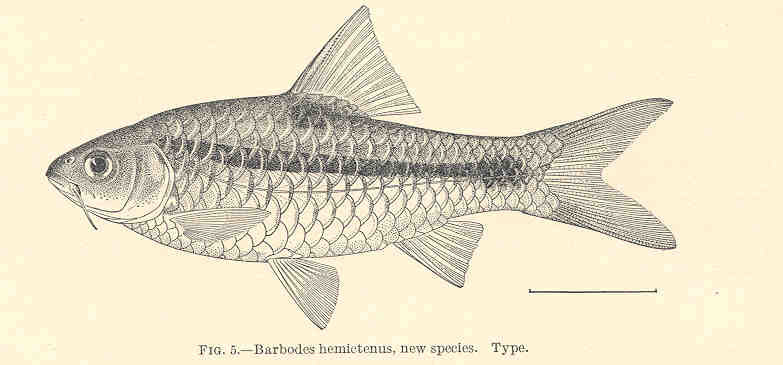

Conservation status
- Vulnerable (IUCN 3.1)

Scientific classification
- Kingdom: Animalia
- Phylum: Chordata
- Class: Actinopterygii
- Order: Cypriniformes
- Family: Cyprinidae
- Genus: Barbodes
- Species: B. hemictenus

Binomial name
- Barbodes hemictenus D. S. Jordan & R. E. Richardson, 1908

Synonyms
- Puntius hemictenus (D. S. Jordan & R. E. Richardson, 1908)

= Barbodes hemictenus =

Species of fish

Barbodes hemictenus is a species of cyprinid fish endemic to the island of Mindoro in the Philippines. It is only known to occur in the Sabaan, Mamboc and Baco rivers and Lake Naujan.

This species can reach a length of 10 centimetres (3.9 in) TL.
