= Barbodes baoulan =

Conservation status
- Extinct (IUCN 3.1)

Scientific classification
- Kingdom: Animalia
- Phylum: Chordata
- Class: Actinopterygii
- Order: Cypriniformes
- Family: Cyprinidae
- Genus: Barbodes
- Species: †B. baoulan

Binomial name
- †Barbodes baoulan Herre, 1926

Synonyms
- Puntius baoulan (Herre, 1926)

Species of fish

Barbodes baoulan, known locally as the Baolan, was a species of cyprinid endemic to Lake Lanao in Mindanao, the Philippines where it was found in deeper waters. This species reached a length of 10.8 centimetres (4.3 in) SL. It is now considered extinct.
