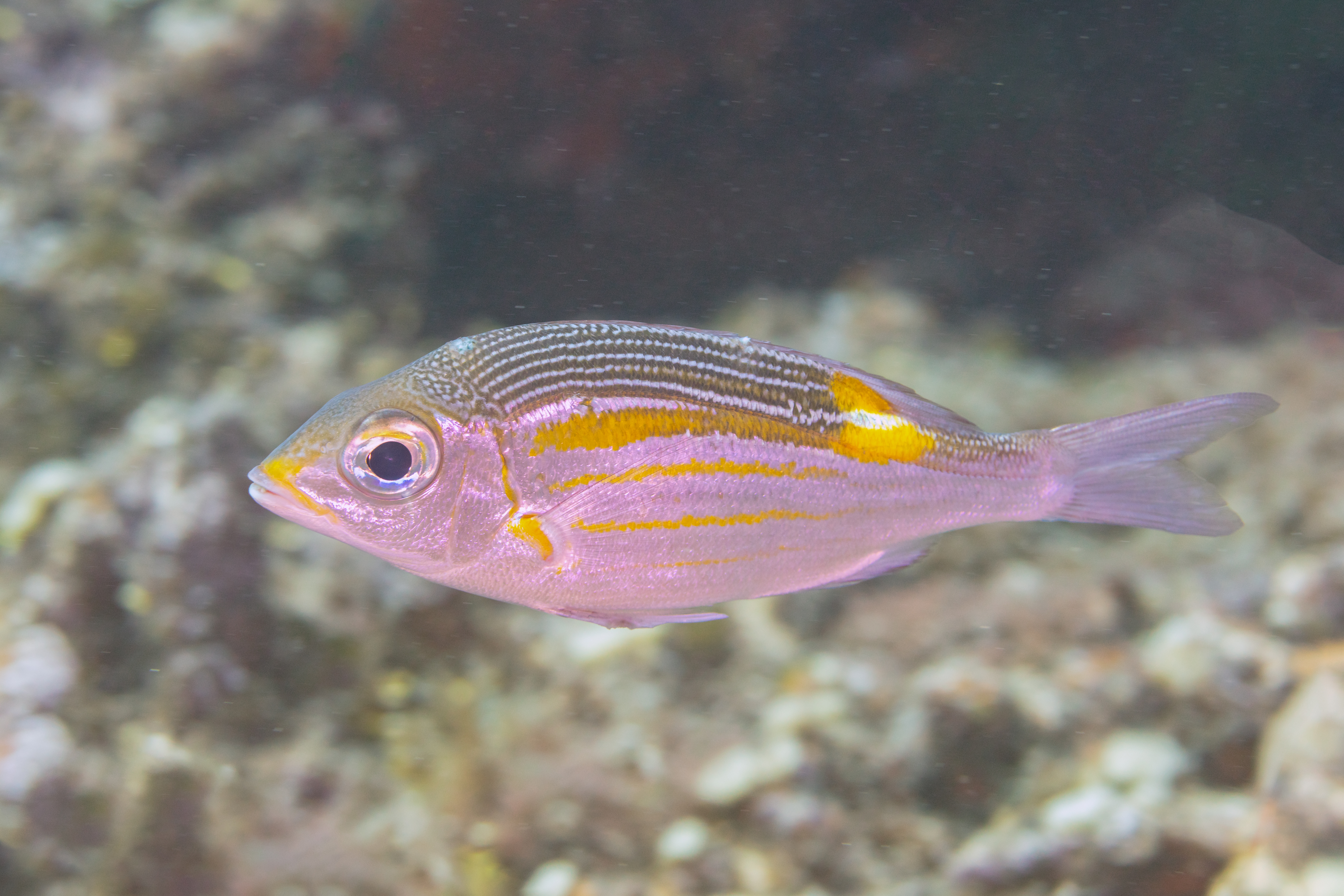

Conservation status
- Least Concern (IUCN 3.1)

Scientific classification
- Kingdom: Animalia
- Phylum: Chordata
- Class: Actinopterygii
- Order: Acanthuriformes
- Family: Lethrinidae
- Genus: Gnathodentex; Bleeker, 1873
- Species: G. aureolineatus

Binomial name
- Gnathodentex aureolineatus (Lacépède, 1802)

Synonyms
- Sparus aureolineatus Lacépède, 1802; Dentex lycogenis E. T. Bennett, 1831; Gnathodentex oculomaculatus Herre, 1935

= Gnathodentex =

Genus of fishes

Gnathodentex is a genus of marine ray-finned fish belonging to the family Lethrinidae, the emperors or emperor breams . It is a monotypic genus, containing a single species, the goldspot seabream (Gnathodentex aureolineatus), also known as the striped large-eye bream. This taxon has a wide distribution in Indo-West Pacific region.

== Taxonomy ==
Gnathodentex was first proposed as a monospecific genus in 1873 by the Dutch physician, herpetologist and ichthyologist Pieter Bleeker, with Sparus auereolineatus as its only species. Sparus auereolineatus had originally been described by the French naturalist Bernard Germain de Lacépède in 1802 based on a description in a manuscript by Philibert Commerson, no type locality was given and the holotype could not be located in the National Museum of Natural History, France by Bauchot and Daget in 1972. Some authors place this genus in the subfamily Monotaxinae but the 5th edition of Fishes of the World does not recognise the subfamilies traditionally accepted within the family Lethrinidae as valid. The family Lethrinidae is classified by the 5th edition of Fishes of the World as belonging to the order Spariformes.

== Etymology ==
Gnathodentex combines ganthos, which means "jaw", with dentex, meaning "teeth", but which may also allude to the genus Dentex, and which is a reference to the bristle-like teeth on the upper and the lower jaw. The specific name aureolineatus means "gold-lined" and is a reference to the 4 or 5 brownish-orange stripes on the otherwise silvery whitish lower body.

== Description ==
Gnathodentex is a medium-sized fish which can grow up to a maximum length of 30 cm (12 in), however the commonly observed size is 20 cm. Its body is compressed laterally, the snout is pointed and the tail is forked. The background coloration is silver-grey with golden horizontal lines on the sides, these later are topped by dark horizontal lines. Its fins have pinkish shades, a yellow moustache-like line overcomes the upper lip, the junction of the pectoral fins to the body is marked with yellow and also along the outer edge of the operculum. A golden yellow spot located on the back at the termination of the dorsal fin is a hallmark of this species. In proportion to body size, the eyes are quite large. The dorsal fin is supported by 10 spines and 10 soft rays while the anal fin contains 3 spines and 8 to 10 soft rays.

== Distribution & habitat ==
Gnathodentex aureolineatus is present in tropical and subtropical waters of the Indo-Pacific area from the eastern coast of Africa to the Pacific Ocean's islands, Hawaii excluded. It is not found in the Red Sea or Persian Gulf. The goldspot seabream likes the proximity of reefs which slopes are external or not.

== Biology ==
Ganthodentex has a nocturnal activity, during daytime, it can be seen alone or in large to small compact group close by the reef. At night, they disperse to feed. Its diet consists of small prey such as benthic invertebrates like various kind of crustaceans and gastropods, also sometimes small fish.

== Fisheries ==
Gnathodentex is caught in commercial fisheries using fish traps, gillnets and handlines and the catch is sold fresh. The main regions where it is fished for are off South Africa and Mozambique, and the Philippines. There are reports of the consumption of this species being linked to ciguatera poisoning.
