= Barbodes resimus =

Conservation status
- Extinct (IUCN 3.1)

Scientific classification
- Kingdom: Animalia
- Phylum: Chordata
- Class: Actinopterygii
- Order: Cypriniformes
- Family: Cyprinidae
- Genus: Barbodes
- Species: †B. resimus

Binomial name
- †Barbodes resimus (Herre, 1924)

Synonyms
- Mandibularca resimus Herre, 1924; Mandibularca resinus Herre, 1924 (erroneous spelling); Puntius resinus (Herre, 1924)

Extinct species of fish

Barbodes resimus is an extinct species of cyprinid fish endemic to Lake Lanao in Mindanao, Philippines where it was only known to occurs at the Agus Rapids at the lake's outlet. It was one of the several species of fish in the Philippines known as bagangan. This species reached a length of 2.2 centimetres (0.87 in) TL.

== Taxonomic Issue ==
The specific epithet of this species has been rendered as "resinus" as appeared in one of Herre's two 1924 papers regarding this species. In the other the specific epithet is given as "resimus". It is uncertain as to which paper was published first, however he gave the etymology of the specific epithet as meaning "turned upward". This means that the intended correct spelling of the specific epithet would be "resimus" and not "resinus" which would be either lapsus calami if published first or an erroneous subsequent spelling if published last.
