= Barbodes dorsimaculatus =

Scientific classification
- Kingdom: Animalia
- Phylum: Chordata
- Class: Actinopterygii
- Order: Cypriniformes
- Family: Cyprinidae
- Genus: Barbodes
- Species: B. dorsimaculatus

Binomial name
- Barbodes dorsimaculatus (C. G. E. Ahl, 1923)

Synonyms
- Barbus dorsimaculatus C. G. E. Ahl, 1923; Puntius dorsimaculatus (C. G. E. Ahl, 1923)

Species of fish

Barbodes dorsimaculatus, the blackline barb, is a species of cyprinid fish endemic to Sumatra. This species can reach a length of 3.1 centimetres (1.2 in) TL. It can also be found in the aquarium trade.
