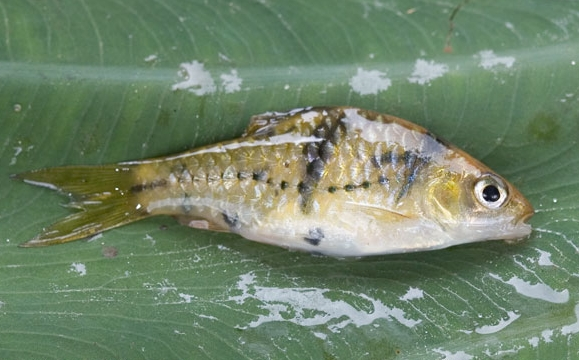

Scientific classification
- Kingdom: Animalia
- Phylum: Chordata
- Class: Actinopterygii
- Order: Cypriniformes
- Family: Cyprinidae
- Genus: Barbodes
- Species: B. kuchingensis

Binomial name
- Barbodes kuchingensis (Herre, 1940)

Synonyms
- Puntius kuchingensis Herre, 1940

= Barbodes kuchingensis =

Species of fish

Barbodes kuchingensis is a species of cyprinid fish native to Indonesia where it occurs in the Kapuas River basin and Malaysia where it is known from Sarawak. It prefers sandy or rocky pools in clear foothill and forest streams.
