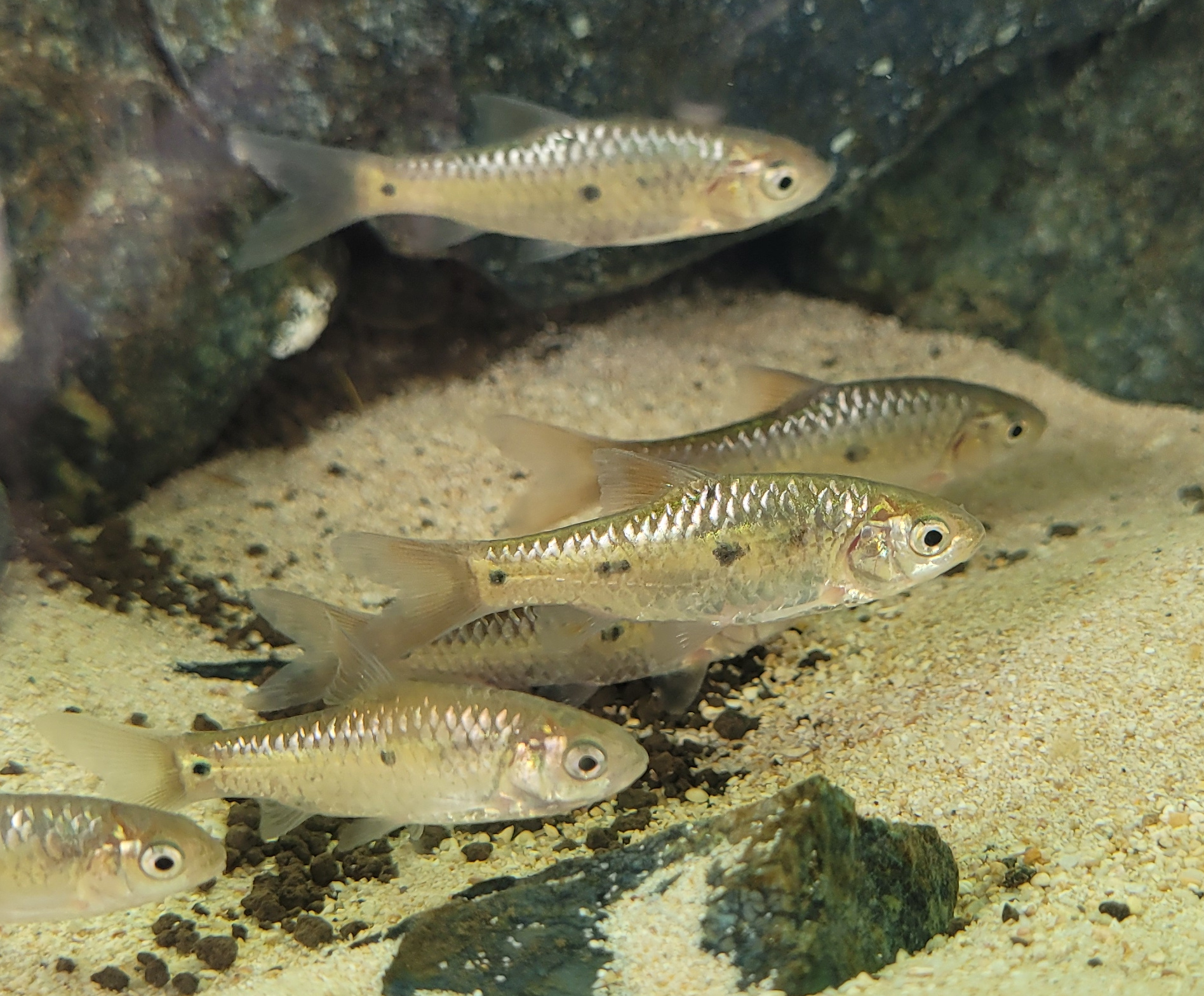
- Barbodes montanoi from the Pulangi River, Bukidnon, Philippines

Conservation status
- Endangered (IUCN 3.1)

Scientific classification
- Kingdom: Animalia
- Phylum: Chordata
- Class: Actinopterygii
- Order: Cypriniformes
- Family: Cyprinidae
- Genus: Barbodes
- Species: B. montanoi

Binomial name
- Barbodes montanoi (Sauvage, 1881)

Synonyms
- Puntius montanoi Sauvage, 1881

= Barbodes montanoi =

Species of fish

Barbodes montanoi is a species of cyprinid fish endemic to the island of Mindanao, the Philippines. It is commonly known as pait, pait-pait, or paitan, along with other native Barbodes species. This species can reach a length of 9 centimetres (3.5 in) TL. It is silvery greenish-gray in color and is characterized by a body pattern of two to six black dots or dashes (depending on the development stage). The fins are yellowish to reddish in color. The species is named after the French naturalist and explorer Joseph Montano.
