= Barbodes sealei =

Conservation status
- Least Concern (IUCN 3.1)

Scientific classification
- Kingdom: Animalia
- Phylum: Chordata
- Class: Actinopterygii
- Order: Cypriniformes
- Family: Cyprinidae
- Subfamily: Smiliogastrinae
- Genus: Barbodes
- Species: B. sealei

Binomial name
- Barbodes sealei Herre, 1933

Synonyms
- Barbus sealei (Herre, 1933); Puntius sealei (Herre, 1933); Barbus elongatus Seale, 1910 (Ambiguous); Puntius elongatus (Seale, 1910)

Species of fish

Barbodes sealei is a species of cyprinid fish endemic to Borneo where it is an inhabitant of streams and rivers. This species can reach a length of 13.7 centimetres (5.4 in) TL.
