= Barbodes clemensi =

Conservation status
- Extinct (IUCN 3.1)

Scientific classification
- Kingdom: Animalia
- Phylum: Chordata
- Class: Actinopterygii
- Order: Cypriniformes
- Family: Cyprinidae
- Genus: Barbodes
- Species: †B. clemensi

Binomial name
- †Barbodes clemensi Herre, 1924

Synonyms
- Puntius clemensi (Herre, 1924)

Extinct species of fish

Barbodes clemensi is an extinct species of cyprinid endemic to Lake Lanao in Mindanao, the Philippines. It was one of the several species of fish in the Philippines known as bagangan. This species can reach a length of 23.5 centimetres (9.3 in) TL.
