= Barbodes herrei =

Conservation status
- Extinct (IUCN 3.1)

Scientific classification
- Kingdom: Animalia
- Phylum: Chordata
- Class: Actinopterygii
- Order: Cypriniformes
- Family: Cyprinidae
- Genus: Barbodes
- Species: †B. herrei

Binomial name
- †Barbodes herrei (Fowler, 1934)

Synonyms
- Barbus herrei Fowler, 1934; Puntius herrei (Fowler, 1934)

Extinct species of fish

Barbodes herrei is an extinct species of cyprinid fish formerly endemic to Lake Lanao in Mindanao, the Philippines. This species was commercially important to local peoples.
