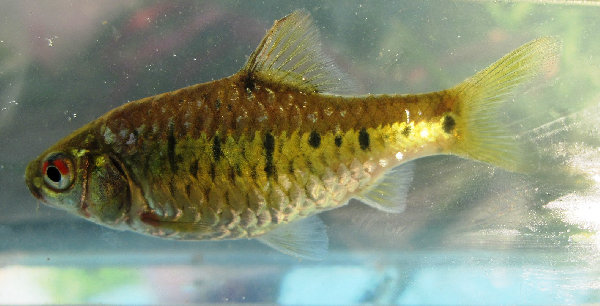

Conservation status
- Least Concern (IUCN 3.1)

Scientific classification
- Kingdom: Animalia
- Phylum: Chordata
- Class: Actinopterygii
- Order: Cypriniformes
- Family: Cyprinidae
- Genus: Barbodes
- Species: B. semifasciolatus

Binomial name
- Barbodes semifasciolatus (Günther, 1868)

Synonyms
- Barbus aureus Tirant, 1883 (Ambiguous); Barbus hainani Lohberger, 1929; Barbus semifasciolatus Günther, 1868; Capoeta semifasciolata Günther, 1868; Puntius sachsii Ahl, 1923; Puntius semifasciolata Günther, 1868; Puntius semifasciolatus Günther, 1868

= Gold barb =

Chinese barb

Species of fish

This species may be confused with: golden barb (P. gelius).

Barbodes semifasciolatus, the Chinese barb, is a species of cyprinid fish native to the Red River basin in southeast Asia where they occur in fresh waters at depths of 5 metres (16 ft) or less. The captive variant popularly known as the gold barb or Goldfinned barb or Schuberti barb is an extremely popular aquarium fish.

== Description ==
Adults of this species have highly arched backs and a short pair of barbels on the upper jaw at the corners of the mouth. The back is light to reddish brown, the sides are metallic green or yellow-green, with a brassy or golden sheen below. The belly is whitish, and yellow-green in males at mating time. Females can be distinguished by their dull colors and their overall bulk.

This species can reach a length of 7 centimetres (2.8 in) TL though most do not exceed 3.5 centimetres (1.4 in) SL.

== Diet ==
Their diet consists of invertebrates (such as insects, crustaceans and worms) and plant matter.

== Breeding ==
An egg-scatter, adult barbs will usually spawn around a hundred eggs, although up to 400 eggs have been observed from an exceptional female. This breeding occurs at the first light in the early morning.

== In the aquarium ==
The popular gold strain P. semifasciolatus var. Schuberti (gold barb or Schuberti barb) was developed by hobbyist Thomas Schubert of Camden, New Jersey in the 1960s through selective breeding. For many years it was thought to be a distinct species but is in fact a selected sort of the indigenous (green) species which is rarely found in aquaria. The gold barb is an active, mildly aggressive schooling species that spends most of its time in the mid-level and bottom of the water. Its typical lifespan in captivity is around four to six years. This gold fish is often used in community tanks by fish keeping hobbyists. It breeds readily in outdoor pools and free-standing ponds during summer months, and withstands cooler temperatures better than other tropical fish. However, it does not stand the cold as well as its original plainer China barb counterparts.

Albino variants of the gold barbs have been produced by Dennis Wilcox in the 1970s in the US. Gold barbs with no black markings have been observed by Stanislav Frank in Europe also around that time. Flesh colour (pink) specimens appeared by the 1990s. Tri-colour, i.e., black, yellow, and pink specimens appeared recently. In an aquarium, the gold barb eats flake food readily, but benefits from the occasional feeding of live food such as mosquito larvae or daphnia.

== Nonindigenous Sightings ==
In 1940, the Chinese barb was introduced into the Nuʻuanu Reservoir on Oʻahu, Hawaiʻi, brought for both culinary use and ornamental purposes. However, the population did not persist, as a drought in 1984 led to its local extinction.

== Gallery ==
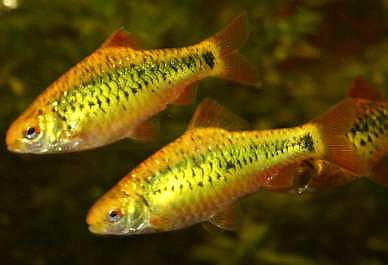

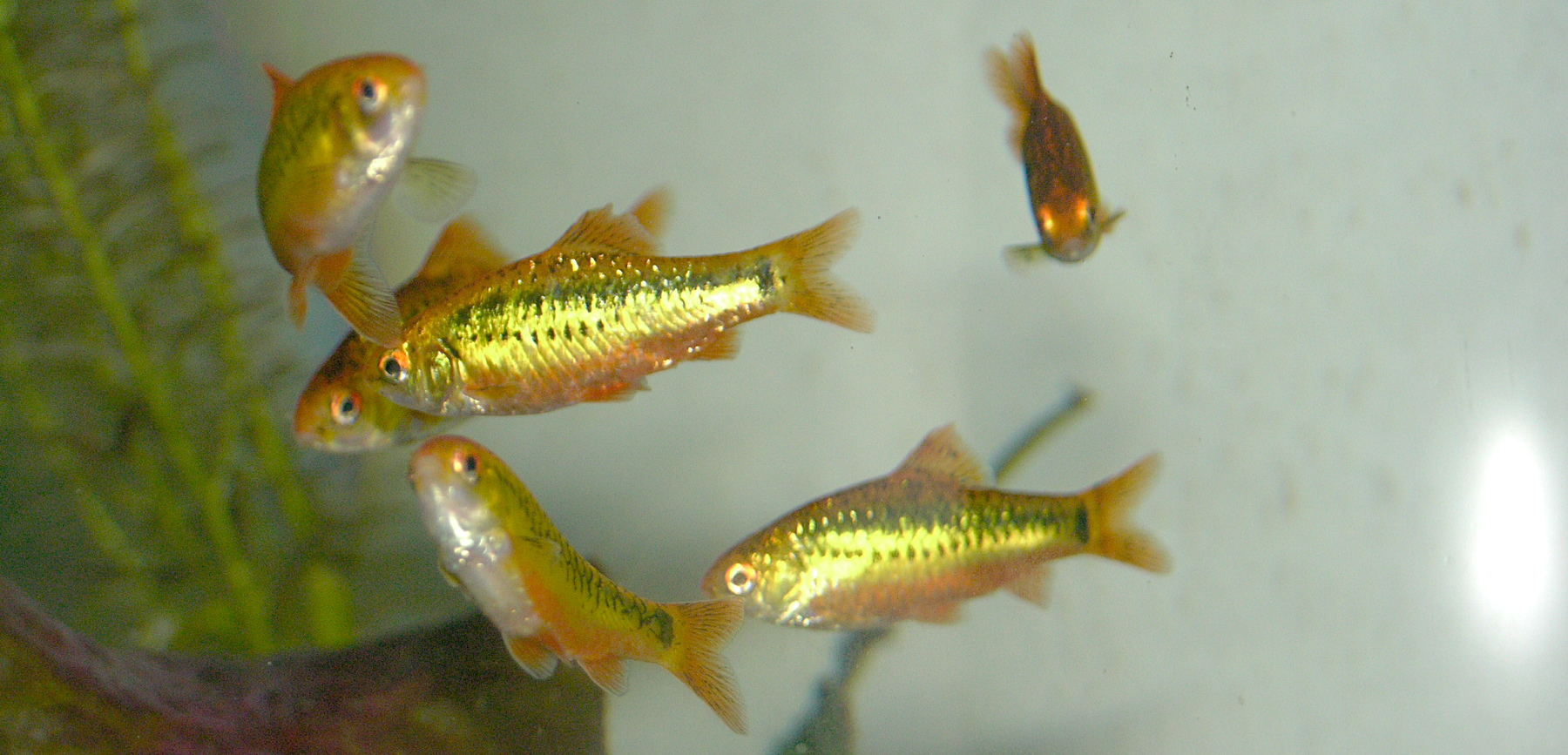

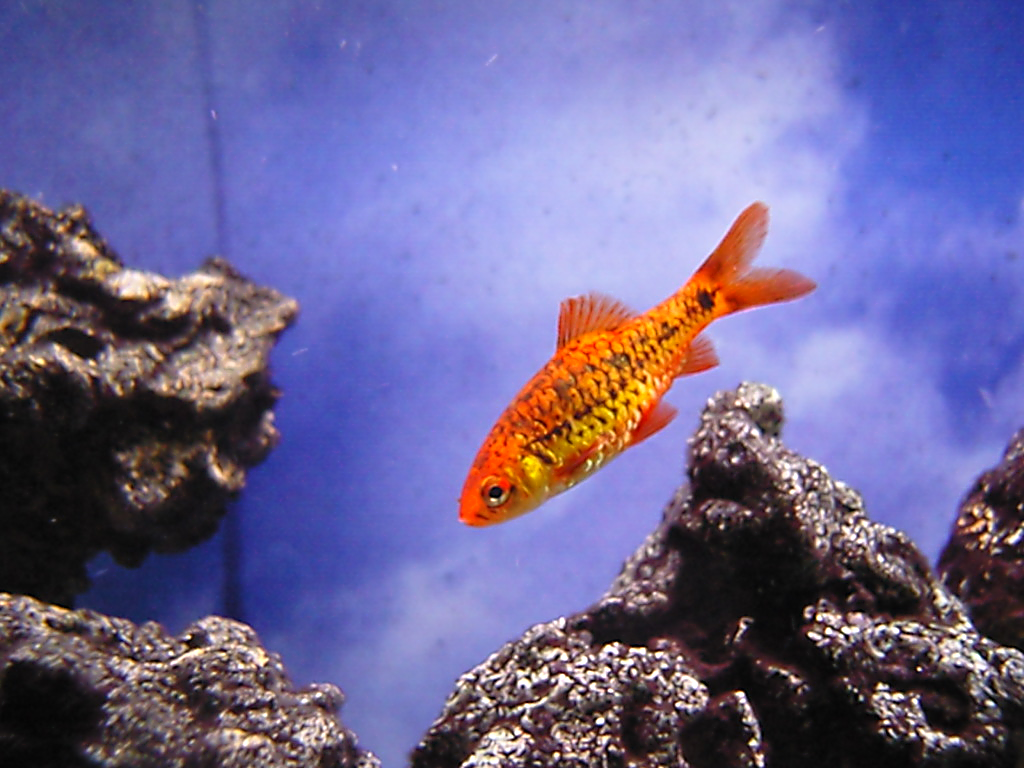

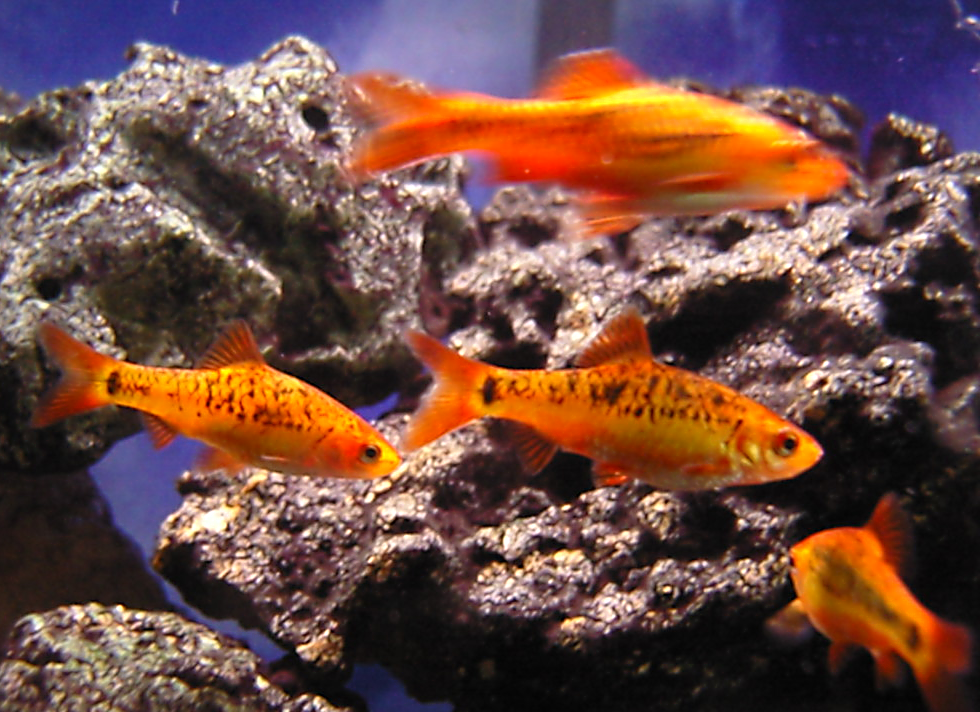

== See also ==
- List of freshwater aquarium fish species
