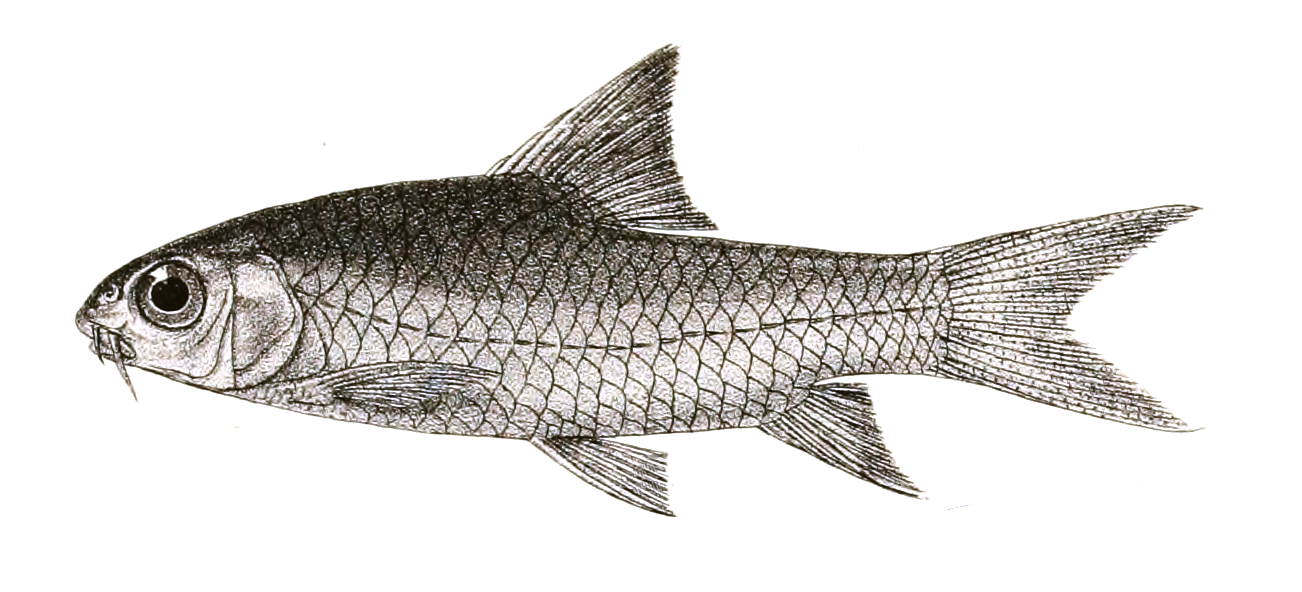

Conservation status
- Critically endangered, possibly extinct (IUCN 3.1)

Scientific classification
- Kingdom: Animalia
- Phylum: Chordata
- Class: Actinopterygii
- Order: Cypriniformes
- Family: Cyprinidae
- Genus: Barbodes
- Species: B. bovanicus

Binomial name
- Barbodes bovanicus (Day, 1877)

Synonyms
- Neolissochilus bovanicus (Day, 1877); Barbus bovanicus Day, 1877; Puntius bovanicus (Day, 1877)

= Barbodes bovanicus =

Bowany barb

Species of fish

Barbodes bovanicus, the Bowany barb, is a species of cyprinid fish native to the Cauvery River system in India. Its range is presently restricted to a single reservoir behind the Mettur Dam in Tamil Nadu. This species can reach a length of 36 centimetres (14 in) TL.

== Etymology ==
The specific epithet is derived from the Bhavani River.
