= Barbodes microps =

Scientific classification
- Domain: Eukaryota
- Kingdom: Animalia
- Phylum: Chordata
- Class: Actinopterygii
- Order: Cypriniformes
- Family: Cyprinidae
- Genus: Barbodes
- Species: B. microps

Binomial name
- Barbodes microps (Günther, 1868)

Synonyms
- Barbus microps Günther, 1868; Puntius microps (Günther, 1868)

Species of fish

Barbodes microps is a species of cyprinid fish endemic to Indonesia. This species can reach a length of 12.5 centimetres (4.9 in) TL.
