= Barbodes pyrpholeos =

Scientific classification
- Kingdom: Animalia
- Phylum: Chordata
- Class: Actinopterygii
- Order: Cypriniformes
- Family: Cyprinidae
- Genus: Barbodes
- Species: B. pyrpholeos

Binomial name
- Barbodes pyrpholeos H. H. Tan & Husana, 2021

Species of fish

Barbodes pyrpholeos is a species of cave‑dwelling cyprinid fish endemic to Mindanao in the southern Philippines. It is the first troglobitic cyprinid recorded from the Philippines and only the second known cave‑dwelling species of Barbodes in the Sundaic region. The species was described in 2021 by Tan Heok Hui and Daniel Edison M. Husana.

== Etymology ==
The specific epithet pyrpholeos combines the Greek pyr ("fire") and pholeos ("cave"), referring to the species' fiery red fins and cave‑dwelling lifestyle.
