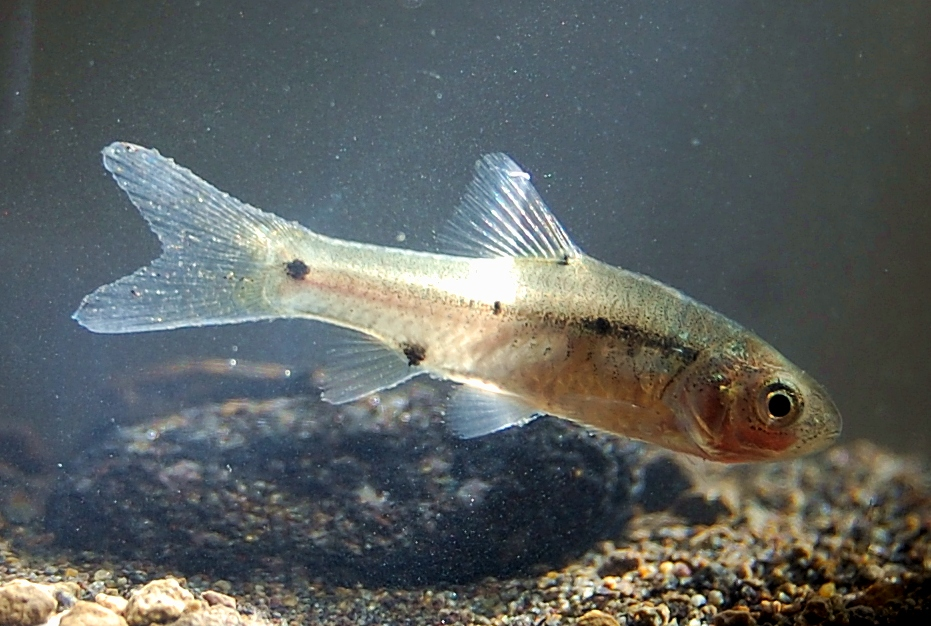
- Juvenile Barbodes binotatus from the Ciliwung River, Bogor, West Java, Indonesia

Conservation status
- Least Concern (IUCN 3.1)

Scientific classification
- Kingdom: Animalia
- Phylum: Chordata
- Class: Actinopterygii
- Division: Teleostei
- Order: Cypriniformes
- Family: Cyprinidae
- Genus: Barbodes
- Species: B. binotatus

Binomial name
- Barbodes binotatus (Valenciennes, 1842)

Synonyms
- Barbus binotatus Valenciennes, 1842; Capoeta binotata (Valenciennes, 1842); Puntius binotatus (Valenciennes, 1842); Systomus binotatus (Valenciennes, 1842); Barbus maculatus Kuhl & van Hasselt, 1823 (ambiguous); Barbus maculatus Valenciennes, 1842 (ambiguous); Systomus maculatus (Valenciennes, 1842); Barbus oresigenes Bleeker, 1849; Barbus blitonensis Bleeker, 1852; Barbus kusanensis Bleeker, 1852; Barbus polyspilos Bleeker, 1857; Systomus goniosoma Bleeker, 1860; Barbus goniosoma (Bleeker, 1860); Barbus maculatus hagenii Popta, 1911; Puntius sibukensis Fowler, 1941

= Spotted barb =

Species of fish

Barbodes binotatus, commonly known as the spotted barb or common barb, is a tropical species of cyprinid fish endemic to Java, Indonesia.

== Description ==
Its color in life varies from a silvery gray to greenish gray, darker dorsally and paler or nearly white on its throat and belly. It has a bar behind the operculum on its shoulder. On large fish, body markings (spots or band) may be absent, except for the spot on the caudal base. It has a round, broad-tipped snout equal to or slightly larger than the eye. The fish will grow in length up to 7.75 inches (19.7 cm).

== Distribution and habitat ==
The species was previously thought to have a much wider native range in Southeast Asia, but it is now known that B. binotatus sensu stricto is restricted to the island of Java in Indonesia. All other descriptions of B. binotatus sensu lato in other areas of Southeast Asia are either mistaken identifications of similar species or undescribed taxa superficially similar to B. binotatus.

Its native environment occurs from about sea level to above 2,000 m above sea level. It is commonly found below waterfalls in isolated mountain streams and on small islands inhabited by few other freshwater fish. It inhabits medium to large rivers, stagnant water bodies. It is usually found in the middle to bottom depths of fairly shallow waters where it feeds on zooplankton, insect larvae and some vascular plants. They live in a tropical climate and prefer water with a 6.0 - 6.5 pH, a water hardness of 12.0 dGH, and a temperature range of 75–79 °F (24–26 °C).

== Reproduction ==
An open water, substrate egg-scatter, the adult barbs will spawn around dawn.

== Importance to humans ==
The spotted barb is popular among aquarium enthusiasts, as a fish that requires little care and easy to maintain. Additionally, it is also consumed in parts of East and Central Java.

== See also ==
- List of freshwater aquarium fish species
