= Albert William Herre =

American zoologist (1868–1962)

Albert William Christian Theodore Herre
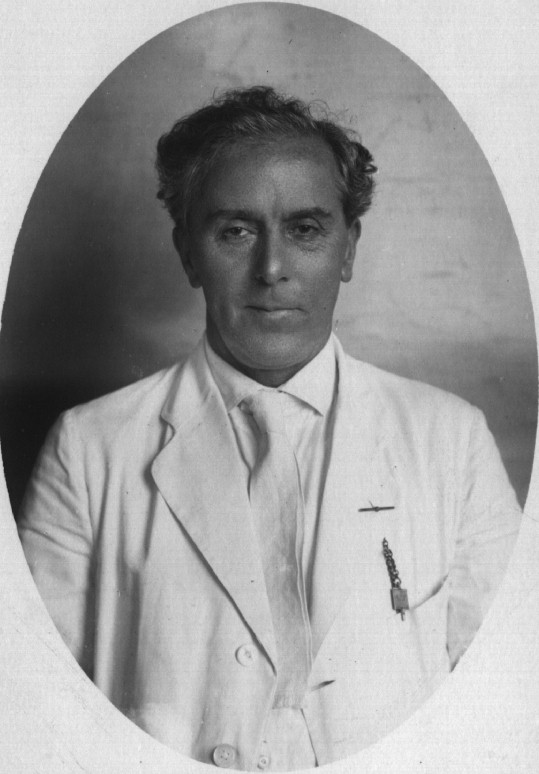
- Born: September 16, 1868; Toledo, Ohio, U.S.
- Died: January 16, 1962 (aged 93); Santa Cruz, California, U.S.
- Education: Stanford University
- Known for: description of many new Philippine fish species
- Scientific career
- Fields: ichthyology, lichenology, ecology
- Workplaces: Bureau of Science in Manila; Stanford University; University of Washington
- Author abbrev. (zoology): Herre

Albert William Christian Theodore Herre (September 16, 1868 – January 16, 1962) was an American ichthyologist and lichenologist. Herre was born in 1868 in Toledo, Ohio. He was an alumnus of Stanford University, where he received a Bachelor of Science degree in botany in 1903. Herre also received a master's degree and a Ph.D. from Stanford, both in ichthyology. He died in Santa Cruz, California in 1962.

== Work in the Philippines ==
Albert W. Herre was perhaps best known for his taxonomic work in the Philippines, where he was the Chief of Fisheries of the Bureau of Science in Manila from 1919 to 1928. While in the Bureau of Science of the Insular Government of the Philippine Islands (which was administered by the United States at the time), Herre was responsible for discovering and describing new species of fish.

== Lichenology ==
Alongside his better-known career in ichthyology, Herre carried on decades of work as a lichenologist, beginning with his Stanford training in botany and culminating in a sustained focus on North American lichens. After earning his doctorate at Stanford in 1908 from research on the lichens of California's Santa Cruz Peninsula, he continued collecting and studying lichens during and after his museum and fisheries appointments, often gathering specimens on the same trips that supported his zoological work. In retirement he collected actively in Washington and northern California, and records compiled from herbarium databases attribute hundreds of Usnea ("beard lichen") specimens to him, reflecting a long-running commitment to documenting the genus in the field and in collections.

In the late 1950s and early 1960s, Herre concentrated on the difficult genus Usnea, working toward a comprehensive treatment of the North American species at a time when identification in the group was widely regarded as challenging and disagreements over names were common. He secured National Science Foundation support for a "Monograph of the Genus Usnea in North America" and, at age 90, undertook a months-long "herbarium crawl" across the United States to examine vouchers firsthand, correct misidentifications, and test his draft descriptions and identification keys against real collections. Contemporary accounts described the monograph as nearly complete by 1960, with a large typescript, photographic plates, and an extensive key, but publication stalled and Herre died in 1962 during the final stages of the effort. The monograph itself has not been located in major archives despite repeated searches, although related keys associated with his project circulated later among lichenologists and were recast for use decades afterward.

== Legacy ==
Herre is commemorated in the scientific name of a species of gecko, Lepidodactylus herrei, which is endemic to the Philippines. The fish Mesonoemacheilus herrei Nalbant & Bănărescu, 1982 is named after him.

== Selected works ==
- Herre, A. W. (1927). "Gobies of the Philippines and the China sea". The Philippine Bureau of Science, Monographic Publications on Fishes. 23. Manila:Bureau of Printing: 78.
- Herre, A. W. (1925). "Notes on Philippine Sharks, II. The great white shark, the whale shark, and the cat sharks and their allies in the Philippines". Philippine Journal of Fisheries. 26 (1). Manila:Bureau of Printing: 113–129.
- Herre, A. W. (1924). "Distribution of the true fresh-water fishes in Philippines I: The Philippine Cyprinidae". Philippine Journal of Science. 24 (3). Manila:Bureau of Printing: 249–307.

== See also ==
- Taxa named by Albert William Herre
