= List of Asian species extinct in the Holocene =

Map of Asia

This is a list of Asian species extinct in the Holocene that covers extinctions from the Holocene epoch, a geologic epoch that began about 11,650 years before present (about 9700 BCE) (Note: The source gives "11,700 calendar yr b2k (before CE 2000)". But "BP" means "before CE 1950". Therefore, the Holocene began 11,650 BP. Doing the math, that is c. 9700 BCE.) and continues to the present day.

This list includes the Asian continent and its surrounding islands, including Cyprus. The three Transcaucasian republics of Georgia, Armenia, and Azerbaijan are included in the List of European species extinct in the Holocene, even though their territory may fall partially or fully in Asia depending on the definition of Europe considered. Species from Western New Guinea (Indonesia), the Aru Islands (Indonesia), and Christmas Island (Australia) are listed in the List of Australia-New Guinea species extinct in the Holocene.

Many extinction dates are unknown due to a lack of relevant information.

== Mammals (class Mammalia) ==
=== Bandicoots and bilbies (order Peramelemorphia) ===
==== Bandicoots (family Peramelidae) ====
Scientific name	Range	Comments
Peramelidae gen. et. sp. nov.	Halmahera, Indonesia	Most recent remains dated to 4240-1529 BCE.

=== Kangaroos, possums, wombats, and allies (order Diprotodontia) ===
==== Kangaroos and wallabies (family Macropodidae) ====
Scientific name	Range	Comments
Dorcopsis sp.	Halmahera, Indonesia	Most recent remains dated to 80 CE.

=== Elephant-like mammals (order Proboscidea) ===
==== Elephants and mammoths (family Elephantidae) ====
Common name	Scientific name	Range	Comments	Pictures
Syrian elephant	Elephas maximus asurus	Mesopotamia	Archaeological evidence and historical records imply local extinction caused by hunting and deforestation in the 8th century BCE, with war elephants from the 3rd century BCE onward being imported from South Asia. However, the lack of evidence of Asian elephants in the Near East between 200,000 and 3,500 years ago has led some authors to propose that Bronze Age elephants were actually introduced by people to provide themselves with exotic game and ivory. If true, this would invalidate the subspecies E. m. asurus.	
Javan elephant	Elephas maximus sondaicus	Java, Indonesia; introduced to Sulu, Philippines	Most recent remains in Mauk, Indonesia dated to 1350. It was introduced to Sulu in the 14th century, where it survived until its extermination in 1850. However, the extant Bornean elephant has been suggested to have originated from Sulu stock and not be native to the island. If true, this would make the subspecies E. m. sondaicus synonymous with E. m. borneensis and not globally extinct.	
Woolly mammoth	Mammuthus primigenius	Northern Eurasia and North America	Most recent remains in Wrangel Island, Russia dated to 1795-1675 BCE.	
Cyprus dwarf elephant	Palaeoloxodon cypriotes	Cyprus	Most recent remains dated to 10699-7299 BCE.	
Asian straight-tusked elephant	Palaeoloxodon namadicus	South and East Asia	The date 7330-6250 BCE was obtained from carbonaceous clay near Palaeoloxodon remains in the Baneta Formation of the Narmada Valley, India, suggesting survival into the Holocene, though no direct datation was taken from the bones. It was also suggested that representations of elephants in art from northern China depict Palaeoloxodon rather than Asian elephants as commonly assumed, but other authors disagree with this assessment.	

==== Stegodonts (family Stegodontidae) ====
Scientific name	Range	Comments	Pictures
Stegodon orientalis	China, Southeast Asia, Japan, and Taiwan	Most recent remains at Gulin Cave, Sichuan dated to 10432-8225 BCE.	

=== Sea cows (order Sirenia) ===
==== Dugongs (family Dugongidae) ====
Common name	Scientific name	Range	Comments	Pictures
Steller's sea cow	Hydrodamalis gigas	Bering Sea	The last population was discovered in the Commander Islands in 1741 and heavily hunted for meat and leather until it disappeared by 1768. The hunting of sea otters leading to a proliferation of Strongylocentrotus sea urchins that ate the kelp that the sea cows depended on has been suggested as an additional cause.	

=== Lagomorphs (order Lagomorpha) ===
==== Rabbits and hares (family Leporidae) ====
Common name	Scientific name	Range	Comments
Don hare	Lepus timidus tanaiticus	Russia	Gradually replaced by the extant mountain hare south to north until becoming extinct during the Subboreal, 3050-550 BCE.

=== Rodents (order Rodentia) ===
==== Old World rats and mice (family Muridae) ====
Common name	Scientific name	Range	Comments	Pictures
Alor Island giant rat	Alormys aplini	Alor Island, Indonesia	Most recent remains at Tabubung 4 dated to 62 BCE - 87 CE. The extinction coincides with a period of aridification, deforestation, and extinction of other giant rat species in the island.	
Sierra Madre giant cloud rat	Carpomys dakal	Luzon, Philippines	Most recent remains dated to 2050-50 BCE. Probably disappeared due to increased aridity and deforestation.	
Buhler's coryphomys	Coryphomys buehleri	Timor island, Indonesia & East Timor	Most recent remains dated to around 50 BCE.	
Timor giant rat	Coryphomys musseri	Timor island, Indonesia & East Timor	Most recent remains dated to around 50 BCE.	
Sierra Madre bushy-tailed cloud rat	Crateromys ballik	Luzon, Philippines	Most recent remains dated to 2050-50 BCE. Probably disappeared due to increased aridity and deforestation.	
Miyako long-tailed rat	Diplothrix miyakoensis	Miyako Island, Ryukyu, Japan	Most recent remains dated to around 9050-8050 BCE.	
Hooijer's giant rat	Hooijeromys nusantenggara	Lesser Sunda Islands, Indonesia	Most recent remains dated to around 1050 BCE.	
	Milimonggamys juliae	Sumba Island, Indonesia	Most recent remains dated to 54-222 CE.	
	Niviventer sp.	Ishigaki Island, Japan	Most recent remains dated to 2050-50 BCE.	
Verhoeven's giant tree rat	Papagomys theodorverhoeveni	Flores, Indonesia	Most recent remains to around 1050 BCE.	
	Raksasamys tikusbesar	Sumba Island, Indonesia	Most recent remains dated to 1935-1700 BCE.	
Flores cave rat	Spelaeomys florensis	Flores, Indonesia	Most recent remains dated to 3500-775 BCE.	
	Muridae indet.	Morotai, Indonesia	Two unnamed species most recently dated to 4514-4244 BCE.	

===== Possibly extinct =====
Common name	Scientific name	Range	Comments	Pictures
Ilin Island cloudrunner	Crateromys paulus	Mindoro or Ilin Island, Philippines	Only known from one specimen collected in 1953, generally believed to be from Ilin Island but this is not certain, and could be Mindoro or another nearby location. Later searches in Ilin and Mindoro repeatedly failed to find evidence of this species. If native to Ilin, it could have been threatened by deforestation as the island has no primary forest left in the present.	

=== Primates (order Primates) ===
==== Great apes (family Hominidae) ====
Common name	Scientific name	Range	Comments	Pictures
Mainland orangutan	Pongo sp.	Southern China and Indochina	Holocene remains are known from China, Vietnam, Laos, and possibly Cambodia, while the existence of an indigenous, onomatopoeic name in Vietnam (đười ươi) and indigenous folklore in Peninsular Malaysia suggest survival into historical times. It possibly disappeared as a result of hunting and habitat destruction for agriculture, though evidence is scarce.	

==== Gibbons (family Hylobatidae) ====
Common name	Scientific name	Range	Comments	Pictures
Imperial gibbon	Nomascus imperialis	Chongqing and possibly Shaanxi, China	Most recent remains found in Chang'an, in the tomb of Lady Xia, grandmother of Qin Shi Huang, who died around 240 BCE. Possibly declined due to deforestation and capture of individuals to become pets. Historical records mention gibbons being caught near Chang'an until the 10th century, and living in Shaanxi province until the 18th century.	

=== Bats (order Chiroptera) ===
==== Megabats (family Pteropodidae) ====
===== Locally extinct =====
Common name	Scientific name	Range	Comments
Panay golden-crowned flying fox	Population of the giant golden-crowned flying fox (Acerodon jubatus)	Panay, Philippines	Extinct population named as a distinct species (A. lucifer) in the 19th century, but later included in A. jubatus.

==== Vesper bats (family Vespertilionidae) ====
Common name	Scientific name	Range	Comments
Gloomy tube-nosed bat	Murina tenebrosa	Tsushima and possibly Yakushima, Japan	Last collected in 1962. Suggested as a possible synonym for the Ussuri tube-nosed bat (M. ussuriensis).
Sturdee's pipistrelle	Pipistrellus sturdeei	Haha-jima, Bonin Islands, Japan	Only known from the type specimen collected in 1889.

=== Carnivorans (order Carnivora) ===
==== Cats (family Felidae) ====
Common name	Scientific name	Range	Comments	Pictures
Eurasian cave lion	Panthera spelaea	Northern Eurasia and Beringia	Most recent remains at Kokorevo 2, Upper Yenisei, Russia dated to 11350-9600 BCE.	

===== Locally extinct =====
Common name	Scientific name	Range	Comments	Pictures
Formosan clouded leopard	Population of the clouded leopard (Neofelis nebulosa)	Taiwan	Last confirmed record in 1983. Though named as a subspecies on the basis of a stuffed specimen in 1862 (N. n. brachyura), later morphological and genetic studies invalidate this distinction.	
Bali tiger	Population of the Sunda Island tiger (Panthera tigris sondaica)	Bali, Indonesia	Last confirmed individual killed in 1937. Named as a separate subspecies in 1912 (P. t. balica), but later included in P. t. sondaica on genetic grounds.	
Bornean tiger	Population of the Sunda Island tiger (Panthera tigris sondaica)	Borneo and Palawan, Philippines	A navicular from Borneo was dated to 8550-1050 BCE. Survival into more recent times has been proposed on the basis of teeth and skins owned by indigenous peoples, local names, folklore, and alleged sightings including two photographs taken in 1975. However, most authors discount these remains as imports from outside Borneo, and the photographs as hoaxes.	
Javan tiger	Population of the Sunda Island tiger (Panthera tigris sondaica)	Java, Indonesia	The last confirmed individual was killed at the Mount Halimun Salak National Park in 1984, though a tiger was sighted near Sukabumi Selatan in 2019 and one recovered hair was identified as closer genetically to a Javan museum specimen than to tigers from Sumatra, southeast Asia, and Russia. It was named as a subspecies in 1844, but genetic research indicates that it is not different enough from the extant Sumatran tiger, and as a result, P. t. sondaica is not extinct.	
Caspian tiger	Population of the mainland Asian tiger (Panthera tigris tigris)	Western and Central Asia	The last known wild individual was killed in Turkey in 1970, and the last in captivity in Iran during the 1979 Revolution. Though named as the subspecies P. t. virgata in 1815, genetic evidence indicates that it is not different enough from other tigers of the Asian mainland to warrant separate status. It was closest to the extant Siberian tiger. A reintroduction project using Siberian tigers began in the Ile-Balkhash State Nature Reserve of Kazakhstan in 2024.	

===== Extinct in the wild =====
Common name	Scientific name	Range	Comments	Pictures
South China tiger	Population of the mainland Asian tiger (Panthera tigris tigris)	Southern China	Last recorded in the wild around 2000; survives in captivity. Though named as the subspecies P. t. amoyensis in 1905, genetic evidence indicates that it is not different enough from other mainland tigers to warrant separate status.	

==== Genets and civets (family Viverridae) ====
Common name	Scientific name	Range	Comments
Cypriot genet	Genetta plesictoides	Cyprus	Most recent remains dated to 9050 BCE.

===== Possibly extinct =====
Common name	Scientific name	Range	Comments	Pictures
Malabar large-spotted civet	Viverra civettina	Western Ghats, India	Last collected in 1989.	

==== Dogs (family Canidae) ====
Common name	Scientific name	Range	Comments	Pictures
Hokkaidō wolf	Canis lupus hattai	Hokkaidō, Sakhalin, Kamchatka, Iturup and Kunashir	Exterminated by 1889 as part of a plan to use Hokkaidō for horse and cattle ranching.	
Japanese wolf	Canis lupus hodophilax	Honshū, Shikoku, and Kyūshū, Japan	Last confirmed individual killed in 1905, shortly after a rabies epidemic ravaged the population.	

===== Possibly extinct =====
Common name	Scientific name	Range	Comments	Pictures
Ussuri dhole	Cuon alpinus alpinus	Western Sayan Mountains to Sikhote-Alin and North Korea	Last recorded in the Western Sayan in 2008.	
Tien Shan dhole	Cuon alpinus hesperius	Pamir to Altai Mountains	Last recorded in Altai in the 1970s. Estimated extinct in the former Soviet Union but could survive outside of it. Scat from a dhole of unknown subspecies was found in the Bek-Tosot Conservancy of southern Kyrgyzstan in 2022.	

==== Bears (family Ursidae) ====
Common name	Scientific name	Range	Comments	Pictures
Bacon's giant panda	Ailuropoda melanoleuca baconi	Southern China and Indochina	Most recent remains at Gulin Cave, Sichuan dated to 10432-8225 BCE.	

==== Eared seals (family Otariidae) ====
Common name	Scientific name	Range	Comments	Pictures
Japanese sea lion	Zalophus japonicus	Japanese archipelago and Korea	Last confirmed record in the Liancourt Rocks in 1951, with unconfirmed sightings reaching to 1975.	

==== Martens, polecats, otters, badgers, and weasels (family Mustelidae) ====
Common name	Scientific name	Range	Comments	Pictures
Hokkaidō otter	Lutra lutra whiteleyi	Hokkaidō and southern Kuril Islands	Last known individual killed at the Shiretoko Peninsula in 1950.	
Japanese otter	Lutra nippon	Honshū, Shikoku, and Kyūshū, Japan	Last confirmed sighting in Shikoku in 1983.	

=== Odd-toed ungulates (order Perissodactyla) ===
==== Horses, asses, and zebras (family Equidae) ====
Common name	Scientific name	Range	Comments	Pictures
Tarpan	Equus ferus ferus	Iberian Peninsula to Western Siberia; Anatolia?	Historically recorded in Western Siberia until the 18th century. Analysis of bones found at archaeological sites from the Chalcolithic period (c. 3000-2000 BCE) show wild horses in this area belonged to the subspecies E. f. ferus and not to Przewalski's horse (E. f. przewalskii).	Tarpan drawn by Charles Hamilton Smith from eyewitness testimonies (1841).
Syrian wild ass	Equus hemionus hemippus	Fertile Crescent	Last known individual died in captivity at Vienna Zoo in 1927. Probably disappeared from the wild around the same time.	
European wild ass	Equus hemionus hydruntinus	Southern Europe to northern Iran	Most recent remains at Çatalhöyük, Turkey dated to 748-406 BCE.	
Lena horse	Equus lenensis	Northern Siberia	Most recent remains at Bolshoy Lyakhovsky Island dated to 320-220 BCE. Horse remains of undetermined affiliation were also found in an Inuit site at Cape Baranov dating to the 8th-9th century CE. The cold-adapted Yakutian horse was speculated to be a descendant of the Lena horse, but genetic evidence shows it descends from domestic horses introduced from Central Asia in the Middle Ages. Nevertheless, the Yakutian horse is used as proxy for the Lena horse in Pleistocene Park.	
Ovodov horse	Equus ovodovi	Southern Siberia to northern China	Most recent remains in China dated to 1666-1506 BCE.	

===== Extinct in the wild =====
Common name	Scientific name	Range	Comments	Pictures
Przewalski's horse	Equus ferus przewalskii	Central and eastern Asian steppe	Last confirmed sighting in the wild in the Gobi Desert in 1969. It was reintroduced to the Gobi and at Hustai National Park, Mongolia in 1992.	

===== Locally extinct =====
Common name	Scientific name	Range	Comments	Pictures
African wild ass	Equus africanus	North Africa, Horn, Levant, and Arabian Peninsula	Most recent remains at Hili 8, United Arab Emirates dated to 3000 BCE.	

==== Tapirs (family Tapiridae) ====
Common name	Scientific name	Range	Comments	Pictures
Giant tapir	Tapirus augustus	Southern China and Indochina	Most recent remains at Gulin Cave, Sichuan dated to 10432-8225 BCE.	

===== Locally extinct =====
Common name	Scientific name	Range	Comments	Pictures
Bornean tapir	Population of the Malayan tapir (Tapirus indicus)	Borneo	Most recent remains at the Niah Caves, Sarawak dated to c. 6000 BCE. The Bornean tapir was similar in size or slightly smaller than other populations. Possible folk memory of the animal was documented in the island in the 19th century.	

==== Rhinoceroses (family Rhinocerotidae) ====
Common name	Scientific name	Range	Comments	Pictures
Woolly rhinoceros	Coelodonta antiquitatis	Northern Eurasia	Environmental DNA last detected in permafrost dating to 8050-7650 BCE near the Kolyma river, Russia.	
Chinese rhinoceros	Rhinoceros sinensis	Southern China	Most recent remains dated to the Early Holocene (12-8,500 years ago) of Panlong Cave, Guangxi. However, this species has been used as a wastebasket taxon in the past and remains of Merck's rhinoceros and Sumatran rhinoceros have been misassigned to it, urging its revision. Some authors consider R. sinensis a synonym of the Indian rhinoceros (R. unicornis).	
Vietnamese rhinoceros	Rhinoceros sondaicus annamiticus	Vietnam, Laos, Cambodia, and eastern Thailand	Last individual killed at the Cat Tien National Park, Vietnam in 2010.	
Lesser Indian rhinoceros	Rhinoceros sondaicus inermis	Northeastern India, Bangladesh, and Myanmar	Last confirmed individual killed around 1888 in the Sundarbans. Survival into the 20th century is doubtful, certainly not past 1925.	

===== Possibly extinct =====
Common name	Scientific name	Range	Comments	Pictures
Northern Sumatran rhinoceros	Dicerorhinus sumatrensis lasiotis	India, Bhutan, Bangladesh, and Myanmar	Confirmed extinct in the three former countries but could survive in the Lassai Tract of Myanmar.	

=== Even-toed ungulates (order Artiodactyla) ===
==== Camels and llamas (family Camelidae) ====
===== Extinct in the wild =====
Common name	Scientific name	Range	Comments	Pictures
Bactrian camel	Camelus bactrianus	Central and eastern Asian steppe	Genetic evidence indicates that the domestic Bactrian camel and the extant, more desert-adapted wild Bactrian camel (C. ferus) from East Turkestan split over one million years ago. In consequence, the latter species cannot be the wild ancestor of the former, and the unknown ancestor of C. bactrianus must have become extinct at some point after the species was domesticated around 4000-3000 BCE.	
Dromedary	Camelus dromedarius	Arabian Peninsula	Most recent remains of the wild form at Al Sufouh, United Arab Emirates, dated to 404 BCE. The species survives as domestic and feral populations.	

==== Pigs (family Suidae) ====
Common name	Scientific name	Range	Comments
Cebu warty pig	Sus cebifrons cebifrons	Cebu, Philippines	Described from skulls collected in Cebu island, where the species Sus cebifrons is now extinct, but lack of other remains makes the subspecies distinction with other Philippine islands populations dubious. The whole species is threatened by habitat fragmentation caused by logging and agriculture, hunting pressure, and hybridization with domestic pigs.
	Sus sp.	Miyako Island, Japan	Most recent remains dated to 9050-8050 BCE.

==== Hippopotamuses (family Hippopotamidae) ====
Common name	Scientific name	Range	Comments	Pictures
Cypriot pygmy hippopotamus	Hippopotamus minor	Cyprus	Most recent remains dated to 10699-7299 BCE.	

===== Locally extinct =====
Common name	Scientific name	Range	Comments	Pictures
Common hippopotamus	Hippopotamus amphibius	Subsaharan Africa, Egypt, and the Levantine coast	Disappeared from the Southern Levant during the Iron Age (1200-586 BCE). Being a large semiaquatic species, the hippopotamus was particularly vulnerable to habitat fragmentation and loss caused by the expanding human population.	

==== Chinese river dolphins (family Lipotidae) ====
===== Possibly extinct =====
Common name	Scientific name	Range	Comments	Pictures
Baiji	Lipotes vexillifer	Middle and lower Yangtze River, China	The last known animal, Qi Qi, died in captivity at the Wuhan Institute of Hydrobiology in 2002. There was an unconfirmed sighting in the wild in 2018. The species declined as a result of habitat loss by water development and construction, hunting, incidental mortality caused by fishing and vessel strikes, sedimentation from poor land practices, and pollution.	

==== True deer (family Cervidae) ====
Common name	Scientific name	Range	Comments	Pictures
Miyako roe deer	Capreolus tokunagai	Miyako Island, Ryukyu, Japan	Most recent remains dated to 9050-8050 BCE.	
Irish elk	Megaloceros giganteus	Western Europe to southern Siberia	Most recent remains at Kamyshlov, Russia dated to 5845-5673 BCE.	
Schomburgk's deer	Rucervus schomburgki	Central Thailand	Last known animals in the wild were killed in 1932 near Sai Yoke and Kwae Yai, and the last in captivity was killed in 1938. Declined in the 19th century because of habitat loss as its wet grassland habitat was turned into rice fields for export. It was also hunted for meat during the monsoon season, and to use its antlers in traditional medicine.	

===== Extinct in the wild =====
Common name	Scientific name	Range	Comments	Pictures
Pere David's deer	Elaphurus davidianus	China proper	Last collected in Hainan in 1868. Possible last records in the continent in Qidong, Jiangsu, around 1796-1820, and in Hainan in 1904. A captive herd survived in the walled Nanyuang Royal Hunting Garden of Beijing from the Yuan Dynasty to the late 19th century, when some individuals were traded to Europe. The Nanyuang herd was either exterminated after a flood in 1895 or during the 1900 Boxer Rebellion. Animals from British zoos were released in protected areas of Beijing in 1985 and Dafeng in 1987, from where other captive herds were established later in Shishou and Yuanyang. In 1998, deer from Shishou escaped during severe flooding and established four free-ranging populations in Hubei and Henan.	

==== Cattle, goats, antelopes, and others (family Bovidae) ====
Common name	Scientific name	Range	Comments	Pictures
Bubal hartebeest	Alcelaphus buselaphus buselaphus	North Africa and Southern Levant	Disappeared from the Southern Levant during the Iron Age (1200-586 BCE).	
Caucasian wisent	Bison bonasus caucasicus	Caucasus, Kurdistan, and Northern Iran	Present in eastern Turkey until the Iron Age.	
Steppe bison	Bison priscus	Northern Eurasia and North America	Most recent, confirmed remains were dated to 6870-6950 BCE near the Popigai River in the Taymyr Peninsula of Russia, and environmental DNA of bison was recovered from permafrost in northeastern Siberia dating to 5050-3800 BCE. Partial B. priscus remains are hard to distinguish anatomically from B. bonasus, which muddles the timeframe of its extinction in Europe and Western Siberia; often the species B. priscus was assigned to Late Pleistocene remains and B. bonasus to Holocene remains without further discussion. However B. priscus is both genetically distinct and known to have survived into the middle Holocene of North America. Remains of either B. priscus or B. bonasus were dated in the Angara River basin to 2550-2440 BCE, and a small bison persisted in the Baikal region until the 7th-10th century CE (considered B. priscus by Boeskorov and B. bonasus by Sipko).	
Indian aurochs	Bos primigenius namadicus	Indian subcontinent	Most recent remains dated to 2200 BCE in Karnataka, India. The Indian aurochs was independently domesticated and is the originator of the zebu cattle.	
Eurasian aurochs	Bos primigenius primigenius	Europe and Western Asia	Present in the Southern Levant until the Iron Age (1200-585 BCE), and the Turkey-Syria border until the Late Middle Ages. It possibly survived in Kamensk-Uralsky, Russia until the 16th or 17th century, and in Novokuznetsk until the 18th. The Eurasian aurochs was domesticated in the Turkey-Syria border region in the ninth millennium BCE, originating the domestic breeds of taurine cattle.	
East Asian aurochs	Bos primigenius sinensis	Southern Siberia to northeastern China	Traditionally considered the same as B. p. primigenius on morphological grounds, but revealed to be genetically distinct. Remains near Lake Baikal were dated to 3020-2960 BCE and in the Songnen Plain of China to c. 1640 BCE. In the Mongolian Altai, the aurochs is depicted in rock art along with the wild yak until the mid-Bronze Age, when both are replaced by the domestic yak. It disappeared due to hunting, habitat loss, and capture of females to supplement domestic taurine cattle herds, which were introduced from the west. Domestic hybrid descendants survive in China, particularly in Tibet, Chamdo, and Yushu. It is likely that many remains from northern China that have been identified as bison or domestic cattle actually belong to aurochs and that it survived for longer than assumed. The anonymous author of the Classic of Poetry (11th-7th century BCE) seems aware of the aurochs's existence.	
Cebu tamaraw	Bubalus cebuensis	Cebu, Philippines	Described from a partial skeleton from either the Late Pleistocene or the Holocene.	
	Bubalus grovesi	South Sulawesi, Indonesia	Most recent remains dated to the Middle or Late Holocene.	
Short-horned water buffalo	Bubalus mephistopheles	Southern to northeastern China	Most recent remains at Gaoling, Xi'an dated to 1750-1650 BCE. The domestic water buffalo now present in China is not a descendant of B. mephistopheles but was introduced from Southeast Asia. The si (兕) mentioned in the Classic of Poetry and the Shuowen Jiezi (c. 100 BCE) has been suggested to be a wild water buffalo.	
	Bubalus palaeokerabau	Java, Indonesia	Most recent remains at Braholo Cave dated to the late Pleistocene or early Holocene.	
Queen of Sheba's gazelle	Gazella bilkis	Taiz, Yemen	Only known from five animals hunted in 1951.	
Saudi gazelle	Gazella saudiya	Arabian Peninsula	Last recorded in 1970. It was hunted to extinction.	
African giant buffalo	Syncerus antiquus	Africa and Arabia	Most recent remains at Saada, Yemen dated to 4390-4210 BCE.	

===== Possibly extinct =====
Common name	Scientific name	Range	Comments	Pictures
Kouprey	Bos sauveli	Southern Vietnam to Yunnan, China	Last confirmed record in 1969. It was hunted for its meat, skull and horns.	

===== Extinct in the wild =====
Common name	Scientific name	Range	Comments	Pictures
Lowland wisent	Bison bonasus bonasus	Western Europe to southern Siberia	Present during the Holocene in the southern Urals, Western Siberia, the Kuznetsk Depression, Altai and Baikal regions (if the latter wasn't B. priscus). The subspecies became globally extinct in the wild after the last wild animals were hunted in Poland during World War I, but survived in captivity. It was reintroduced to the Altai in 1982-1984.	
Arabian oryx	Oryx leucoryx	Arabian Peninsula	Extinct in the wild in 1972 and reintroduced in Jiddat al-Harasis, Oman in 1980.	

===== Locally extinct =====
Common name	Scientific name	Range	Comments	Pictures
Addax	Addax nasomaculatus	Sahara Desert and Arabian Peninsula	Possibly depicted in Neolithic rock art of Jordan.	
Muskox	Ovibos moschatus	Northern Eurasia and North America	Most recent remains in the Taymyr Peninsula, Russia dated to 615-555 BCE. It was reintroduced to the Bikada River area in the same region in 1974.	
Lesser kudu	Tragelaphus imberbis	East Africa and western Arabian Peninsula	No skeletal remains known but appears in Holocene rock art from Saudi Arabia and Jordan in numbers and detail suggestive of being a native species to the area. Recent presence in the Arabian Peninsula is controversial. In 1967, a pair of horns were claimed to have been taken from an animal shot in Jabal Halmayn, Yemen; another was shot in Nuqrah, Saudi Arabia in 1968. Some authors believe both were escapees from private collections, others that the distance between the two locations is larger than it would be expected for introduced specimens.	
Greater kudu	Tragelaphus strepsiceros	Southern to eastern Africa and Arabia	Depicted in Holocene petroglyphs of two Arabian locations.	

== Birds (class Aves) ==
=== Ostriches (order Struthioniformes) ===
==== Ostriches (family Struthionidae) ====
Common name	Scientific name	Range	Comments	Pictures
East Asian ostrich	Pachystruthio anderssoni	Tuva, Transbaikalia, Mongolia, and northern China to the Yellow River	Eggshell fragments most recently dated to 7600-6245 BCE in Shabarakh-usu and Barun Daban, Mongolia. (Note: Attributed to Struthio asiaticus in this source, but this name should be limited to remains from Pleistocene India.)	
Arabian ostrich	Struthio camelus syriacus	Near East and Arabian Peninsula	Last confirmed individual killed in Jubail, Saudi Arabia around 1941; there was also a second-hand report of a dying animal north of Petra, Jordan in 1966. Its closest relative, the North African ostrich, was introduced as a substitute in Saudi Arabia in the 1990s.	

=== Landfowl (order Galliformes) ===
==== Pheasants and allies (family Phasianidae) ====
===== Possibly extinct =====
Common name	Scientific name	Range	Comments	Pictures
Himalayan quail	Ophrysia superciliosa	Possibly Uttarakhand, India and western Nepal	Last recorded with certainty in 1876, though unconfirmed sightings have happened until 2010.	

=== Waterfowl (order Anseriformes) ===
==== Ducks, geese, and swans (family Anatidae) ====
Common name	Scientific name	Range	Comments
Bering cackling goose	Branta hutchinsii asiatica	Commander and Kuril Islands; possibly migratory to Japan	Last recorded in either 1914 or 1929. Disappeared due to hunting and predation by Arctic foxes introduced by fur traders. It is possibly synonymous with the Aleutian cackling goose (B. h. leucopareia).

===== Possibly extinct =====
Common name	Scientific name	Range	Comments	Pictures
Pink-headed duck	Rhodonessa caryophyllacea	Northern and eastern India, Nepal, Bhutan, Bangladesh, and Myanmar	Last recorded in Bihar in 1948-1949. It was uncommon and non-migratory despite its vast range. Declined due to trophy hunting, as it was generally not considered good to eat, and habitat destruction.	
Crested shelduck	Tadorna cristata	Primorye, Hokkaido, and South Korea; possibly North Korea and northeastern China	Last confirmed record in 1964.	

=== Pigeons and doves (order Columbiformes) ===
==== Pigeons and doves (family Columbidae) ====
Common name	Scientific name	Range	Comments	Pictures
Ryukyu wood pigeon	Columba jouyi	Okinawa, Kerama, and Daito Islands, Japan	Last recorded on Okinawa in 1904 and on Daito in 1936, after a quick decline. Possibly extinct due to deforestation.	
Bonin wood pigeon	Columba versicolor	Nakondo Shima and Chichi-jima, Bonin Islands	Last recorded in 1889. Likely extinct due to deforestation and predation by introduced rats and cats.	

===== Possibly extinct =====
Common name	Scientific name	Range	Comments	Pictures
Negros spotted imperial pigeon	Ducula carola nigrorum	Negros and Siquijor, Philippines	Last recorded on both islands in the 1950s.	
Catanduanes bleeding-heart	Gallicolumba luzonica rubiventris	Catanduanes, Philippines	Described from one specimen collected in 1971. Recent sightings were reported in 2008, but its current status is unknown.	
Sulu bleeding-heart	Gallicolumba menagei	Tawi-tawi, Philippines	Described from two individuals collected in 1891, when it was considered extremely rare, but there were unconfirmed local reports in 1995 that it was abundant until the 1970s. Possibly became extinct due to hunting and deforestation.	
Negros fruit dove	Ptilinopus arcanus	Negros Island, Philippines	Only known from the type specimen, a female, collected in 1953. Its mate was also shot but the body fell in the underbrush and could not be retrieved. Likely disappeared due to hunting and large escale deforestation of the island.	

=== Rails and cranes (order Gruiformes) ===
==== Rails (family Rallidae) ====
Common name	Scientific name	Range	Comments
Iwo Jima rail	Amaurornis cinerea brevipes	Naka Iwo Jima and Minami Iwo Jima, Bonin Islands	Last collected in 1911, with a possible sighting in 1925.
Bornean Baillon's crake	Porzana pusilla mira	Borneo	Only collected once in 1912.

===== Possibly extinct =====
Common name	Scientific name	Range	Comments	Pictures
Sharpe's rail	Gallirallus sharpei	unknown; possibly Java, Sumatra, or Borneo	Only known from the holotype collected in 1865.	
Flores rail	Lewinia pectoralis exsul	South and west Flores, Indonesia	Last recorded in 1974.	

==== Cranes (family Gruidae) ====
===== Locally extinct =====
Common name	Scientific name	Range	Comments	Pictures
Australian sarus crane	Grus antigone gillae	Philippines and northeastern Australia	The extirpated Philippine population was described as the subspecies G. a. luzonica on the basis of differences with the Indian (G. a. antigone) and Indochinese subspecies (G. a. sharpii), but genetic studies indicate that it was identical to the Australian subspecies.	

=== Shorebirds (order Charadriiformes) ===
==== Plovers, dotterels, and lapwings (family Charadriidae) ====
===== Possibly extinct =====
Common name	Scientific name	Range	Comments	Pictures
Javan lapwing	Vanellus macropterus	Java and possibly Sumatra and Timor	All reliable and recent records are from Java, with those from other islands being open to interpretation. The last confirmed record was in 1940, and unconfirmed in 2002. Possibly a migratory species. The causes of extinction are unknown but could have been hunting and habitat degradation.	

==== Sandpipers (family Scolopacidae) ====
Common name	Scientific name	Range	Comments	Pictures
Slender-billed curlew	Numenius tenuirostris	Western Eurasia and North Africa	Bred in Kazakhstan and southern Siberia, and wintered in western Morocco and Tunisia. It likely disappeared as a result of habitat alteration in Asia and overhunting in Africa. There have been no confirmed reports worldwide since 2001.	

==== Buttonquails (family Turnicidae) ====
Common name	Scientific name	Range	Comments
Tawi-tawi buttonquail	Turnix sylvaticus suluensis	Jolo and Tawi-tawi, Philippines	Last recorded in the 1950s. It could have disappeared due to severe deforestation and introduced predators.
	Turnix sp.	Timor	Most recent remains dated to 650 CE.

=== Boobies, cormorants, and relatives (order Suliformes) ===
==== Cormorants and shags (family Phalacrocoracidae) ====
Common name	Scientific name	Range	Comments	Pictures
Spectacled cormorant	Urile perspicillatus	Commander Islands and possibly Kamchatka, Russia	Last collected in 1840-1850. It was hunted to extinction.	

=== Pelicans, herons, and ibises (order Pelecaniformes) ===
==== Herons (family Ardeidae) ====
Common name	Scientific name	Range	Comments	Pictures
Bennu heron	Ardea bennuides	Arabian Peninsula	Most recent remains at Umm Al Nar, United Arab Emites, dated to around 2500 BCE. It possibly disappeared due to wetland degradation.	
Bonin nankeen night heron	Nycticorax caledonicus crassirostris	Chichi-jima and Nakōdo-jima, Bonin Islands	Last collected in 1889. The cause of extinction is unknown.	

==== Ibises and spoonbills (family Threskiornithidae) ====
===== Locally extinct in the wild =====
Common name	Scientific name	Range	Comments	Pictures
Northern bald ibis	Geronticus eremita	Mediterranean region	Last wild individual recorded at Palmyra, Syria in 2014. The birds of this region migrated to Ethiopia and Djibouti in the winter by way of Jordan and eastern Saudi Arabia, where they were hunted and sometimes killed in unprotected electric wires. Another reason for decline was the degradation of habitat in Syria due to aridification, livestock grazing, and firewood collection, along with poisoning by pesticides in Turkey. A semi-wild population survives in Birecik, Turkey where birds range free for part of the year but are recluded and fed at the time of migration.	

=== Hawks and relatives (order Accipitriformes) ===
==== Hawks, eagles, kites, harriers and Old World vultures (family Accipitridae) ====
Common name	Scientific name	Range	Comments
Car Nicobar sparrowhawk	Accipiter butleri butleri	Car Nicobar, Nicobar Islands	Last recorded in 1901. There was an unconfirmed sighting in 1977.

===== Possibly extinct =====
Common name	Scientific name	Range	Comments
Daito buzzard	Buteo japonicus oshiroi	Daitō Islands, Okinawa, Japan	Possibly extinct due to deforestation.

=== Owls (order Strigiformes) ===
==== True owls (family Strigidae) ====
===== Possibly extinct =====
Common name	Scientific name	Range	Comments	Images
Siau scops owl	Otus siaoensis	Siau Island, Indonesia	Only known from the holotype collected in 1866, it is sometimes considered a subspecies of the Sulawesi scops owl (Otus manadensis). Likely disappeared due to deforestation.	

==== Barn-owls (family Tytonidae) ====
===== Possibly extinct =====
Common name	Scientific name	Range	Comments
Natuna Bay owl	Phodilus badius arixuthus	Bunguran Island, Indonesia	Known only from the holotype described in 1932. The reasons of extinction are unclear.
Samar Bay owl	Phodilus badius riverae	Samar Island, Philippines	Only known from the holotype described in 1927 and lost in the destruction of the Bureau of Science in Manila in 1945. It has been ruled invalid by some authors because the original description (as the full species Phodilus riverae) did not include comparison with other subspecies.

=== Hornbills and hoopoes (order Bucerotiformes) ===
==== Hornbills (family Bucerotidae) ====
Common name	Scientific name	Range	Comments	Pictures
Ticao tarictic hornbill	Penelopidis panini ticaensis	Ticao Island, Philippines	Last recorded in 1971; it likely disappeared due to hunting and widespread deforestation. The subspecies status is uncertain and is sometimes considered a color morph instead.	

=== Kingfishers and relatives (order Coraciiformes) ===
==== Kingfishers (family Alcedinidae) ====
Common name	Scientific name	Range	Comments	Pictures
Sangihe dwarf kingfisher	Ceyx fallax sangirensis	Sangihe Island, Indonesia	Last recorded in 1997. Likely extinct due to deforestation caused by intense logging and agriculture.	
Ryukyu kingfisher	Todiramphus cinnamominus miyakoensis	Miyako Island, Ryukyu, Japan	Only known from the holotype collected in 1887. Its exact nature is suspect, as the island is unsuitable for kingfishers, the bill's sheath is missing from the holotype, and the length of flight feathers noted in the original description may have been an artefact of preservation. Otherwise the type is similar to the Guam kingfisher.	

=== Woodpeckers and allies (order Piciformes) ===
==== Woodpeckers (family Picidae) ====
Common name	Scientific name	Range	Comments
Cebu white-bellied woodpecker	Dryocopus javensis cebuensis	Cebu, Philippines	Last recorded in the 1940s or 1950s. It became extinct due to deforestation.

=== Parrots (order Psittaciformes) ===
==== Old World parrots (family Psittaculidae) ====
Common name	Scientific name	Range	Comments	Pictures
Sangihe red-and-blue lory	Eos histrio histrio	Sangihe, Indonesia	The current population, discovered in 1995 after heavy trapping in the 1950s and no animals being found in 1970s and 1980s expeditions, appears to be fully hybridized with escapees from the subspecies E. h. challengeri of the Talaud Islands.	
Cebu hanging parrot	Loriculus philippensis chrysonotus	Cebu, Philippines	The last individuals in captivity died in London in 1943, after being caught in the wild in 1929. The date of extinction in the wild is unclear, but was likely caused by widespread deforestation in the 19th and 20th centuries. 2004 reports likely belonged to other subspecies subsequently introduced to the island.	
Siquijor hanging parrot	Loriculus philippensis siquijorensis	Siquijor, Philippines	Last recorded in 1908; a claimed individual collected in 1954 was actually a escaped cage bird. The subspecies likely disappeared due to deforestation and capture for the pet trade.	

=== Perching birds (order Passeriformes) ===
==== Cuckooshrikes (family Campephagidae) ====
Common name	Scientific name	Range	Comments
Cebu bar-bellied cuckooshrike	Coracina striata cebuensis	Cebu, Philippines	Last collected in 1906, with an unconfirmed report in 2000.

===== Possibly extinct =====
Common name	Scientific name	Range	Comments	Pictures
Cebu blackish cuckooshrike	Coracina coerulescens altera	Cebu, Philippines	Last collected in 1906, with an unconfirmed report in 2000. It likely disappeared due to deforestation.	

==== Dippers (family Cinclidae) ====
Common name	Scientific name	Range	Comments
Cyprus dipper	Cinclus cinclus olympicus	Cyprus	Extinct since 1945.

==== True finches (family Fringillidae) ====
Common name	Scientific name	Range	Comments	Pictures
Bonin grosbeak	Carpodacus ferreorostris	Chichi-jima, Bonin Islands	Last collected in 1828; claims of survival until 1890 are not substantiated. Likely disappeared because of deforestation and predation by introduced rats and cats.	

==== Swallows (family Hirundinidae) ====
===== Possibly extinct =====
Common name	Scientific name	Range	Comments	Pictures
White-eyed river martin	Eurochelidon sirintarae	Central Thailand	Last confirmed record in 1978, with an unconfirmed one in 1980. It was a migratory species that wintered in central Thailand but the summer range is unknown. Possibly became extinct due to hunting, deforestation, and capture for the exotic pet trade.	

==== Monarch flycatchers (family Monarchidae) ====
===== Possibly extinct =====
Common name	Scientific name	Range	Comments
Negros celestial monarch	Hypothymis coelestis rabori	Negros and possibly Sibuyan Island, Philippines	Only collected once on Sibuyan in 1892. Last recorded on Negros in the 1990s, where it declined as a consequence of deforestation.

==== Old World flycatchers (family Muscicapidae) ====
===== Possibly extinct =====
Common name	Scientific name	Range	Comments	Pictures
Rück's blue flycatcher	Cyornis ruckii	Near Medan?, Sumatra, Indonesia	Last collected in 1918. There are some doubts about the original distribution, as only four skins are known: two acquired in Peninsular Malaysia where they were certainly imported from elsewhere, and two from Medan. If not migratory, it probably became extinct as a result of widespread deforestation in Medan.	

==== Orioles (family Oriolidae) ====
Common name	Scientific name	Range	Comments	Pictures
Cebu dark-throated oriole	Oriolus steerii assimilis	Cebu, Philippines	Last collected in 1906. Disappeared due to deforestation.	

==== Tits (family Paridae) ====
Common name	Scientific name	Range	Comments
Daito varied tit	Sittiparus varius orii	Kitadaitōjima and Minamidaitōjima, Daito Islands	Last recorded in 1938. It quickly declined as a result of deforestation for sugar cane agriculture and military construction.

==== Babblers (family Timaliidae) ====
===== Possibly extinct =====
Common name	Scientific name	Range	Comments
Astley's leiothrix	Leiothrix astleyi	China	Only known from a pair acquired from a bird trader in 1921. The exact origin is unknown.

==== Thrushes (family Turdidae) ====
Common name	Scientific name	Range	Comments	Pictures
Bonin thrush	Zoothera terrestris	Chichi-jima, Bonin Islands	Last collected in 1828. Probably extinct due to predation by introduced rats and cats.	

==== White-eyes (family Zosteropidae) ====
Common name	Scientific name	Range	Comments	Pictures
Mukojima white-eye	Apalopteron familiare familiare	Mukojima, Nakodo-jima, and probably Chichi-jima, Bonin Islands	Last recorded in 1941. Disappeared due to deforestation.	

== Reptiles (class Reptilia) ==
=== Crocodilians (order Crocodilia) ===
==== Alligators and caimans (family Alligatoridae) ====
Scientific name	Range	Comments	Pictures
Alligator munensis	Ban Si Liam, northeastern Thailand	Only known from a skull from either the Pleistocene or Holocene.	

==== Crocodiles (family Crocodylidae) ====
===== Locally extinct =====
Common name	Scientific name	Range	Comments	Pictures
Nile crocodile	Crocodylus niloticus	Subsaharan Africa, Egypt, and the Levant	Present in Palestine and western Syria until the beginning of the 20th century.	

==== Gharials (family Gavialidae) ====
Common name	Scientific name	Range	Comments	Pictures
Chinese gharial	Hanyusuchus sinensis	South China	Last recorded in Hainan, western Guangxi, and the Han River delta between 1292 and 1630. It was subjected to an official policy of extermination from the Bronze Age to the Ming Dynasty.	

=== Squamates (order Squamata) ===
==== Monitor lizards (family Varanidae) ====
Common name	Scientific name	Range	Comments
Flores monitor	Varanus hooijeri	Flores and Sumba, Indonesia	Last dated to the Holocene on both islands.

=== Turtles and tortoises (order Testudines) ===
==== Softshell turtles (family Trionychidae) ====
===== Locally extinct =====
Common name	Scientific name	Range	Comments	Pictures
Yangtze giant softshell turtle	Rafetus swinhoei	Northern Vietnam and southern China	Found in recent times in two widely separated populations -- one in the lower Yangtze, another in the Red River system of southern China and Vietnam -- which were sometimes considered different species. Pleistocene and Holocene fossils are known from the intermediate area. The last wild records in the Yangtze date to the 1930s. The last individual of this population, a male, survives in captivity at Suzhou Zoo. The last female died at the same location in 2018, when she was over 90 years old. They mated several times but did not produce fertile eggs. The last male is believed to be over 100 years old. The southern population declined strongly from the 1980s, due to increased agricultural and industrial development. The last individual of Hoan Kiem Lake in downtown Hanoi, where turtles were kept in semi-captivity for centuries, died in 2016. The last known female, from Dong Mo Lake, died in 2023, leaving a male first identified through environmental DNA from Xuan Khanh Lake in 2018 as the last known individual in Vietnam, and the wild. The existence of a second individual from Dong Mo Lake is uncertain.	

==== Tortoises (family Testudinidae) ====
Common name	Scientific name	Range	Comments
Ryukyu tortoise	Manouria oyamai	Ryukyu Islands, Japan	Most recent remains dated to around 9050 BCE.

== Amphibians (class Amphibia) ==
=== Toads and frogs (order Anura) ===
==== Fork-tongued frogs (family Dicroglossidae) ====
Common name	Scientific name	Range	Comments	Pictures
Gunther's streamlined frog	Nannophrys guentheri	Sri Lanka	Only known from the holotype collected in 1882. The reasons of extinction are unknown.	

==== Shrub frogs (family Rhacophoridae) ====
Common name	Scientific name	Range	Comments	Pictures
Sri Lanka bubble-nest frog	Pseudophilautus adspersus	Nuwara Eliya, Sri Lanka	Last collected in 1886. The cause of extinction is unknown, but habitat loss due to agriculture has been suggested.	
	Pseudophilautus dimbullae	Dimbula, Sri Lanka	Last recorded in 1940. The causes of extinction are unknown, but habitat loss has been suggested.	
	Pseudophilautus eximius	Dimbula, Sri Lanka	Only known from the holotype collected in 1933. The causes of extinction are unknown, but habitat loss has been suggested.	
	Pseudophilautus extirpo	Sri Lanka	Last recorded in 1882. The cause of extinction is unknown, but habitat loss has been suggested.	
	Pseudophilautus halyi	Pattipola, Sri Lanka	Only known from the holotype collected in 1899. The cause of extinction is unknown, but habitat loss has been suggested.	
Whitenose bubble-nest frog	Pseudophilautus leucorhinus	Sri Lanka	Only known from the holotype collected before 1856. The cause of extinction is unknown, but habitat loss has been suggested.	
	Pseudophilautus maia	Ramboda, Sri Lanka	Only known from two specimens collected in 1876 or earlier. Possibly disappeared when the local forest was cleared in 1978, which also resulted in the extinction of the endemic tree Albizia lankaensis.	
	Pseudophilautus malcolmsmithi	Sri Lanka	Only known from the holotype collected in 1927. The cause of extinction is unknown, but habitat loss has been suggested.	
	Pseudophilautus nanus	Southern Sri Lanka	Only known from the lectotype collected in 1869. The cause of extinction is unknown, but habitat loss has been suggested.	
Sharp-nosed bush frog	Pseudophilautus nasutus	Sri Lanka	Last recorded in 1869; later observations in Sri Lanka and Southern India are misidentifications. The cause of extinction is unknown, but habitat loss has been suggested.	
	Pseudophilautus oxyrhynchus	Sri Lanka	Only known from the lectotype collected in 1872. The cause of extinction is unknown, but habitat loss has been suggested.	
	Pseudophilautus pardus	Sri Lanka	Only known from the holotype collected before 1859. The cause of extinction is unknown, but habitat loss due to agriculture has been suggested.	
	Pseudophilautus rugatus	Taralanda, Sri Lanka	Only known from the holotype collected in 1927. The cause of extinction is unknown, but habitat loss due to agriculture has been suggested.	
	Pseudophilautus temporalis	Sri Lanka	Only known from the lectotype and type series collected in 1864. The cause of extinction is unknown, but habitat loss due to agriculture has been suggested.	
Variable bush frog	Pseudophilautus variabilis	Sri Lanka	Only known from the lectotype collected in 1858. The cause of extinction is unknown, but habitat loss due to agriculture has been suggested.	
	Pseudophilautus zal	Sri Lanka	Not recorded since before 1947. The cause of extinction is unknown, but habitat loss due to agriculture has been suggested.	
	Pseudophilautus zimmeri	Point de Galle, Sri Lanka	Not recorded since 1927. The given range is now heavily urbanized, suggesting habitat destruction as the reason of extinction.	

=== Salamanders and newts (order Urodela) ===
==== True salamanders and newts (family Salamandridae) ====
Common name	Scientific name	Range	Comments	Pictures
Yunnan lake newt	Hypselotriton wolterstorffi	Kunming Lake, Yunnan, China	Last recorded in 1979. Extinct due to predation by introduced fish and frogs, and habitat degradation caused by general pollution, land reclamation, and domestic duck farming.	

== Ray-finned fish (class Actinopterygii) ==
=== Sturgeons and paddlefishes (order Acipenseriformes) ===
==== Sturgeons (family Acipenseridae) ====
Common name	Scientific name	Range	Comments	Pictures
Syr Darya sturgeon	Pseudoscaphirhynchus fedtschenkoi	Syr Darya River	Last recorded in the 1960s. Several dams, pollution and water substraction for agriculture massively altered the hydromorphology of the river. The species was also fished deliberately and accidentally.	

===== Extinct in the wild =====
Common name	Scientific name	Range	Comments	Pictures
Yangtze sturgeon	Acipenser dabryanus	Yangtze River basin, China	Last recorded in the lower Yangtze around 1995. Captive animals were reintroduced to the upper and middle parts of the river in 2007, but there is still no sign of reproduction in the wild. The species declined due to fishing (both direct and accidental), pollution, deforestation on the river margins, and the construction of the Gezhouba Dam, Three Gorges Dam, and Xiangjiaba Dam, which changed the temperature and hydrology and prevented the sturgeon from reaching the lower part of the river.	

===== Locally extinct =====
Common name	Scientific name	Range	Comments	Pictures
European sea sturgeon	Acipenser sturio	Coastal waters of Europe and northern Anatolia	Last recorded in Turkey in the 1980s.	

==== Paddlefishes (family Polyodontidae) ====
Common name	Scientific name	Range	Comments	Pictures
Chinese paddlefish	Psephurus gladius	Yangtze and Yellow River basins, China	Last recorded in 2003. The construction of the Gezhouba Dam in the middle part of the Yangtze blocked the migration route to spawn in the upper river. It was also heavily fished historically, which depleted the species as it had a long generation time.	

=== Herrings and anchovies (order Clupeiformes) ===
==== Herrings (family Clupeidae) ====
===== Possibly extinct =====
Common name	Scientific name	Range	Comments
Manila Bay herring	Clupea manulensis	Manila Bay, Philippines	Not recorded since its description in 1822.

=== Carps, barbs, minnows, and allies (order Cypriniformes) ===
==== Carps, barbs, and barbels (family Cyprinidae) ====
Common name	Scientific name	Range	Comments	Pictures
Beyşehir bleak	Alburnus akili	Lake Beyşehir, Turkey	Extinct due to predation by zanders introduced in 1955. It could also have hybridized with the also introduced Sakarya bleak.	
	Anabarilius macrolepis	Yilong Lake, Yunnan, China	Disappeared when the lake dried completely for 20 days in 1981, as a result of water substraction.	
Pait	Barbodes amarus	Lake Lanao, Philippines	Last recorded in 1982. Disappeared along with most of the original ichthyofauna of the lake (see below) due to excessive and unsustainable fishing practices such as dynamite fishing, extraction of water for industrial, agricultural, and domestic use; illegal logging and pollution, and predation by accidentally introduced tank goby and snakehead gudgeon. The latter species is now the most common fish in the lake.	
Baolan	Barbodes baoulan	Lake Lanao, Philippines	Last recorded in 1991.	
Bagangan	Barbodes clemensi	Lake Lanao, Philippines	Last recorded in 1975.	
	Barbodes disa	Lake Lanao, Philippines	Last recorded in 1964.	
Katapa-tapa	Barbodes flavifuscus	Lake Lanao, Philippines	Last recorded in 1964.	
	Barbodes herrei	Lake Lanao, Philippines	Last recorded in 1974.	
	Barbodes katolo	Lake Lanao, Philippines	Last recorded in 1977.	
Kandar	Barbodes lanaoensis	Lake Lanao, Philippines	Last recorded in 1964.	
	Barbodes manalak	Lake Lanao, Philippines	Last recorded in 1977.	
Bitungu	Barbodes pachycheilus	Lake Lanao, Philippines	Last recorded in 1964.	
Bitungu	Barbodes palaemophagus	Lake Lanao, Philippines	Last recorded in 1975.	
	Barbodes palata	Lake Lanao, Philippines	Last recorded in 1964.	
Bagangan sa erungan	Barbodes resimus	Lake Lanao, Philippines	Last recorded in 1964.	
	Barbodes tras	Lake Lanao, Philippines	Last recorded in 1976.	
Bitungu	Barbodes truncatulus	Lake Lanao, Philippines	Last recorded in 1973.	
Yilong carp	Cyprinus yilongensis	Yilong Lake, Yunnan, China	Disappeared when the lake dried completely for 20 days in 1981, as a result of water substraction.	
Hula bream	Mirogrex hulensis	Lake Hula, Israel	Last recorded in 1975, after most of the lake was drained to turn the bottom into farmland.	
	Schizothorax saltans	Talas River basin, Kazakhstan	Last recorded in 1953. Disappeared due to habitat loss caused by water substraction, high pollution, and fishing.	

===== Possibly extinct =====
Scientific name	Range	Comments
Barbodes cataractae	Misamis Occidental and Lake Lanao, Philippines	The holotype was collected in an unidentified river in Misamis Occidental in 1934. It was only known from Lake Lanao otherwise, and was last recorded there before 1973.
Barbodes lindog	Lake Lanao, Philippines	Last recorded in 2008.
Barbodes sirang	Lake Lanao, Philippines	Last recorded in 2007.

==== True minnows (family Leuciscidae) ====
===== Possibly extinct =====
Common name	Scientific name	Range	Comments
Barada spring minnow	Pseudophoxinus syriacus	Barada river, Lebanon and Syria	Last recorded in 2008. Declined because of water pollution and the draining of the river due to water substraction.

=== Catfishes (order Siluriformes) ===
==== Schilbid catfishes (family Schilbeidae) ====
Common name	Scientific name	Range	Comments
Siamese flat-barbelled catfish	Platytropius siamensis	Chao Phraya and Bang Pakong River basins, Thailand	Last recorded in 1975-1977. Disappeared due to damming and canalization of the rivers, pollution, and reclamation of wetlands around Bangkok.

=== Salmon, trout and relatives (order Salmoniformes) ===
==== Salmon, trout and relatives (family Salmonidae) ====
===== Extinct in the wild =====
Common name	Scientific name	Range	Comments	Pictures
Kunimasu	Oncorhynchus kawamurae	Lake Tazawa, Japan	Extirpated from its original range in 1940, when acidic water was released to the lake during the construction of hydroelectric power infrastructure. Survives in Lake Saiko, where the species was introduced in 1935.	
Beloribitsa	Stenodus leucichthys	Caspian Sea, Volga, Ural, and Terek River drainages	Last recorded in the Ural in the 1960s. All spawning grounds were lost after dams were built in the Volga, Ural, and Terek river drainages. The species continues to exist in captivity, from which it is released periodically in its native range. However, illegal fishing and hybridization with the introduced nelma remain threats to its survival.	

=== Gobies and relatives (order Gobiiformes) ===
==== Gobies (family Gobiidae) ====
===== Possibly extinct =====
Common name	Scientific name	Range	Comments
Bia	Exyrias volcanus	Taal Lake, Philippines	Last recorded in 1927. Possibly disappeared due to overfishing, pollution, habitat degradation, and invasive species among other reasons.
Yellow-bellied goby	Silhouettea flavoventris	Taal Lake, Philippines	Last recorded in 1927. Possibly disappeared due to overfishing, pollution, habitat degradation, and invasive species among other reasons.

=== Cichlids and convict blennies (order Cichliformes) ===
==== Cichlids (family Cichlidae) ====
Common name	Scientific name	Range	Comments	Pictures
	Tristramella intermedia	Lake Hula, Israel	Disappeared when the lake and most adjacent marshes were drained in the 1970s.	
	Tristramella magdelainae	Damascus, Syria	Last collected in the 1950s. Possibly disappeared due to drought, pollution, and water extraction.	
Long jaw tristramella	Tristramella sacra	Sea of Galilee	Last recorded in 1989-1990. The causes of extinction are unknown, but could be related to the destruction of its breeding habitat in the marshes of the northern shore of the lake.	

=== Silversides and rainbowfishes (order Atheriniformes) ===
==== Priapium fishes (family Phallostethidae) ====
===== Possibly extinct =====
Scientific name	Range	Comments
Neostethus ctenophorus	Laguna de Bay, Luzon, Philippines	Not recorded since its description in 1937. Likely disappeared due to pollution.

== Cartilaginous fish (class Chondrichthyes) ==
=== Ground sharks (order Carcharhiniformes) ===
==== Requiem sharks (family Carcharhinidae) ====
===== Possibly extinct =====
Common name	Scientific name	Range	Comments
Lost shark	Carcharinus obsoletus	Southern South China Sea	Last collected in 1934. The coasts it inhabited are heavily exploited, both for fishing and shark fishing, as well as degraded for use in aquaculture, pollution, and destruction of coral reefs.

=== Shovelnose rays and allies (order Rhinopristiformes) ===
==== Sawfishes (family Pristidae) ====
===== Locally extinct =====
Common name	Scientific name	Range	Comments	Pictures
Smalltooth sawfish	Pristis pectinata	Mid-Atlantic Ocean and Mediterranean Sea	Last caught in Israel before 1956.	

== Malacostracans (class Malacostraca) ==
=== Amphipods (order Amphipoda) ===
==== Whale lice (family Cyamidae) ====
Scientific name	Range	Comments
Cyamus rhytinae	Bering Sea	Parasite of Steller's sea cow.

== Insects (class Insecta) ==
=== Dragonflies and damselflies (order Odonata) ===
==== White-legged damselflies (family Platycnemididae) ====
===== Possibly extinct =====
Scientific name	Range	Comments
Risiocnemis laguna	Paete, Luzon, Philippines	Only known from three specimens collected in 1916. The only known locality is now heavily developed and urbanized, making it likely that it disappeared due to habitat destruction.

=== Beetles (order Coleoptera) ===
==== Ground beetles (family Carabidae) ====
Scientific name	Range
Rakantrechus elegans	Japan

== Arachnids (class Arachnida) ==
=== Order Sarcoptiformes ===
==== Family Pterolichidae ====
Scientific name	Range	Comments
Compressalges nipponiae	Central China and Taiwan to Japan and the Russian Far East	Parasite of the crested ibis. A conservation-induced extinction produced in the late 20th century.

== Clitellates (class Clitellata) ==
=== Order Opisthopora ===
==== Family Megascolecidae ====
Scientific name	Range	Comments
Amynthas japonicus	Possibly Dejima or Nagasaki, Japan	Last collected in the 1820s. It could have disappeared due to habitat loss, though the exact locality of origin is unknown.

== Slugs and snails (class Gastropoda) ==
=== Order Stylommatophora ===
==== Family Achatinellidae ====
Scientific name	Range
Lamellidea monodonta	Bonin Islands, Japan
Lamellidea nakadai	Bonin Islands, Japan

==== Family Ariophantidae ====
Scientific name	Range
Vitrinula chaunax	Bonin Islands, Japan
Vitrinula chichijimana	Bonin Islands, Japan
Vitrinula hahajimana	Bonin Islands, Japan

==== Family Charopidae ====
Scientific name	Range
Hirasea planulata	Bonin Islands, Japan

==== Staircase snails (family Diplommatinidae) ====
Scientific name	Range	Comments
Plectostoma sciaphilum	Bukit Panching, Pahang, Peninsular Malaysia	Last recorded in 2001. It occurred in a single karst that was destroyed by limestone quarrying.

==== Family Geomitridae ====
Scientific name	Range	Pictures
Xerocrassa picardi	Israel	

==== Periwinkles (family Littorinidae) ====
Scientific name	Range	Comments
Littoraria flammea	Chinese coast	Last recorded in 1840. Extinct due to habitat loss.

==== Whorl snails (family Vertiginidae) ====
Scientific name	Range
Gastrocopta chichijimana	Bonin Islands, Japan
Gastrocopta ogasawarana	Bonin Islands, Japan

== Plants (kingdom Plantae) ==
=== Lycopods (class Lycopodiopsida) ===
==== Quillworts (family Isoetaceae) ====
Scientific name	Range	Comments
Isoetes sinensis	Jiangsu, Anhui, China	Declined due to industrial development and agricultural expansion.

=== Ferns (class Polypodiopsida) ===
==== Maidenhair ferns and relatives (family Pteridaceae) ====
Scientific name	Range
Adiantum lianxianense	Guangdong, China

=== Flowering plants (clade Angiospermae) ===
==== Cashews (family Anacardiaceae) ====
===== Extinct in the wild =====
Common name	Scientific name	Range	Comments	Pictures
Kalimantan mango	Mangifera casturi	Banjarmasin, Kalimantan, Indonesia	Disappeared from the wild before 1986, probably because of deforestation for agriculture.	

===== Possibly extinct in the wild =====
Scientific name	Range	Comments
Mangifera rubropetala	unknown; possibly Borneo, Sumatra, or Java, Indonesia	The species is cultivated by humans but the existence of wild individuals is unclear.

==== Palm trees (family Arecaceae) ====
===== Extinct in the wild =====
Common name	Scientific name	Range	Comments	Pictures
Tali palm	Corypha taliera	West Bengal, India	The last wild tree was cut down near Shantiniketan in 1979, by villagers who believed it a "ghost Palmyra tree". Survives in captivity in the Indian Botanic Garden of Shibpur and the Fairchild Tropical Garden in Coral Gables, Florida. A possible but unconfirmed individual was discovered in the campus of Dhaka University, Bangladesh.	

==== Sunflowers (family Asteraceae) ====
Scientific name	Range	Comments	Pictures
Pluchea glutinosa	Socotra, Yemen	Last collected between 1888 and 1899.	
Psiadia schweinfurthii	Socotra, Yemen	Last collected in the 1890s.	

==== Begonias (family Begoniaceae) ====
Common name	Scientific name	Range	Comments
Woolly-stalked begonia	Begonia eiromischa	Betong Island, Malaysia	Last collected in 1898. Its original habitat was cleared for agriculture in the 1980s.

==== Birches (family Betulaceae) ====
===== Possibly extinct =====
Common name	Scientific name	Range	Comments
Tau bei qi mu	Alnus henryi	Tanshui, Taiwan	Last collected for sure in 1916. Later references could be misidentified Alnus formosiana.
Gong shan hua	Betula gynoterminalis	Drungzu Nusu Zizhixian, near Gongshan, China	Only known from the holotype collected in 1956. Possibly extinct due to forest clearing and habitat loss.

==== Honeysuckles (family Caprifoliaceae) ====
Scientific name	Range	Comments
Valerianella affinis	Jebel Ma’alih, Socotra, Yemen	Only known from the holotype collected in 1888.

==== Dipterocarps (family Dipterocarpaceae) ====
Common name	Scientific name	Range	Comments	Pictures
Shing-keng	Hopea shingkeng	Arbor Hills, Arunachal Pradesh, India	Only known from the holotype collected in 1911. It has been sometimes reported as occurring in Tibet, either dubiously or erroneously. It could have become extinct as a result of deforestation, as it occurred in low altitude Himalayan moist forests.	

==== Heathers (family Ericaceae) ====
===== Extinct in the wild =====
Scientific name	Range	Comments	Pictures
Rhododendron kanehirai	Feitsui, Taiwan	Its original range was flooded by the construction of a dam in 1984.	

==== Euphorbias (family Euphorbiaceae) ====
===== Extinct in the wild =====
Scientific name	Range	Comments	Pictures
Euphorbia mayurnathanii	Pallasana, Palghat Gap, India	Described from three old specimens discovered on a rocky ledge in 1943. It has been proposed that this species was a relict from when the local climate was drier.	

==== Legumes (family Fabaceae) ====
Common name	Scientific name	Range	Comments
	Albizia lankaensis	Ramboda, Sri Lanka	Disappeared when the forest was cleared in 1978.
Hainan ormosia	Ormosia howii	Hainan and Guangdong, China	Last recorded in 1957. Possibly extinct due to deforestation and agriculture encroaching.

==== Mallows (family Malvaceae) ====
Scientific name	Range	Comments
Sterculia khasiana	Khasi Hills, Meghalaya, India	Last collected in 1877. Likely extinct due to habitat loss caused by extensive agriculture and fires.

==== Soapberries (family Sapindaceae) ====
Scientific name	Range	Comments
Lepisanthes unilocularis	Seashore of Foluo, southwest Hainan, China	Last recorded in 1935.

==== Sapodillas (family Sapotaceae) ====
===== Extinct in the wild =====
Scientific name	Range	Comments	Pictures
Madhuca diplostemon	Kollam, Kerala, India	Only known from three individuals collected in 1835 until a living tree was discovered in a temple's sacred grove in 2019.	

== See also ==
- List of European species extinct in the Holocene
- Holocene extinction
- Lists of extinct species
- List of extinct bird species since 1500
- Extinct in the wild
- Lazarus taxon
