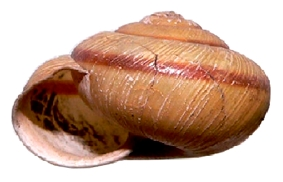
- A shell of Euhadra decorata.

Scientific classification
- Domain: Eukaryota
- Kingdom: Animalia
- Phylum: Mollusca
- Class: Gastropoda
- Order: Stylommatophora
- Family: Camaenidae
- Genus: Euhadra
- Species: E. decorata

Binomial name
- Euhadra decorata Pilsbry & Hirase, 1903

= Euhadra decorata =

Species of gastropod

Euhadra decorata is a species of air-breathing land snail, a terrestrial pulmonate gastropod mollusk in the family Bradybaenidae. This species is found in Japan, and is particularly widespread in the northern Tōhoku region.

The shell of this species is sinistral.
