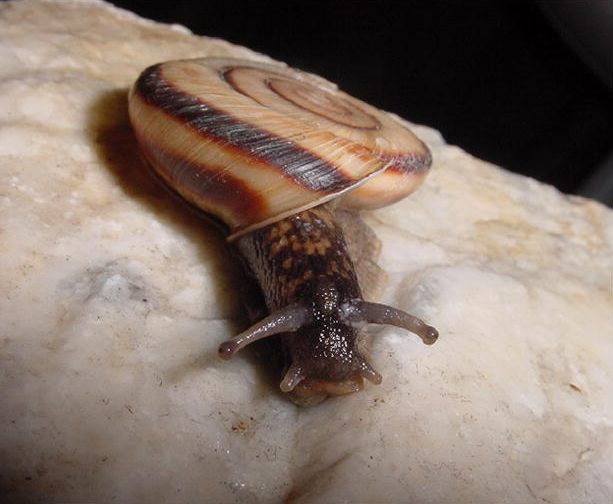

Conservation status
- Data Deficient (IUCN 2.3)

Scientific classification
- Kingdom: Animalia
- Phylum: Mollusca
- Class: Gastropoda
- Order: Stylommatophora
- Family: Camaenidae
- Genus: Euhadra
- Species: E. murayamai

Binomial name
- Euhadra murayamai Habe, 1976

= Euhadra murayamai =

Species of gastropod

Euhadra murayamai is a species of air-breathing land snail, a terrestrial pulmonate gastropod mollusk in the family Bradybaenidae. This species is endemic to Japan.

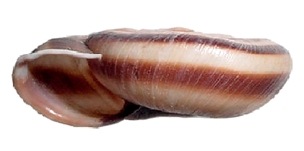
Apertural view of a shell of Euhadra murayamai.

In this species, the gastropod shell is sinistral.
