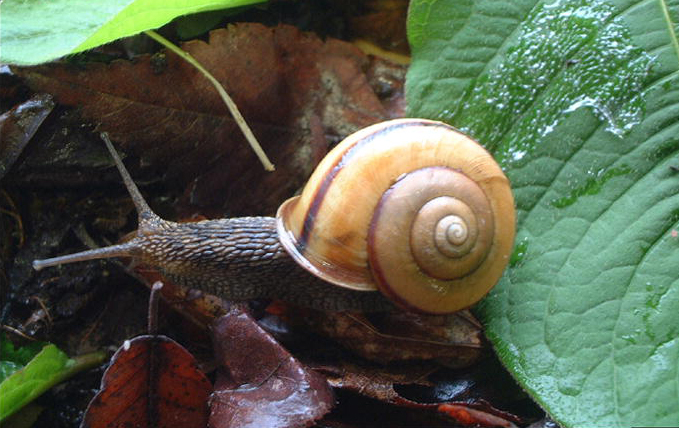

Scientific classification
- Kingdom: Animalia
- Phylum: Mollusca
- Class: Gastropoda
- Order: Stylommatophora
- Family: Camaenidae
- Genus: Euhadra
- Species: E. quaesita

Binomial name
- Euhadra quaesita (Deshayes, 1850)

= Euhadra quaesita =

Species of gastropod

Euhadra quaesita, common name, the sought-after false hadra, is a species of air-breathing land snail, a terrestrial pulmonate gastropod mollusc in the family Bradybaenidae. This species is found in Japan.

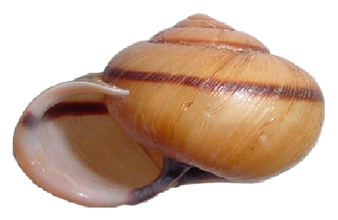
A shell of Euhadra quaesita.

This species is unusual in that its shell is sinistral.

This species of snail makes and uses love darts as part of its courtship behavior.
