= Boninena hiraseana =

Conservation status
- Endangered (IUCN 2.3)

Scientific classification
- Kingdom: Animalia
- Phylum: Mollusca
- Class: Gastropoda
- Order: Stylommatophora
- Family: Enidae
- Genus: Boninena
- Species: B. hiraseana

Binomial name
- Boninena hiraseana (Pilsbry, 1902)

Species of gastropod

Boninena hiraseana is a species of air-breathing land snail, a terrestrial pulmonate gastropod mollusk in the family Enidae.

This species is endemic to Japan.
