= Boninena =

Scientific classification
- Kingdom: Animalia
- Phylum: Mollusca
- Class: Gastropoda
- Order: Stylommatophora
- Family: Enidae
- Genus: Boninena; Habe, 1956

Genus of gastropods

Boninena is a genus of air-breathing land snails, terrestrial pulmonate gastropod mollusks in the family Enidae.

== Species ==
Species within the genus Boninena include:

- Boninena callistoderma
- Boninena hiraseana
- Boninena ogasawarae
