= Boninena callistoderma =

Conservation status
- Endangered (IUCN 2.3)

Scientific classification
- Kingdom: Animalia
- Phylum: Mollusca
- Class: Gastropoda
- Order: Stylommatophora
- Family: Enidae
- Genus: Boninena
- Species: B. callistoderma

Binomial name
- Boninena callistoderma (Pilsbry, 1900)

Species of gastropod

Boninena callistoderma is a species of air-breathing land snail, a terrestrial pulmonate gastropod mollusk in the family Enidae.

This species is currently only endemic to Haha-jima and Ane-jima in the Ogasawara Islands (Japan), having been extirpated from other parts of this archipelago.
