= Sibayi goby =

Conservation status
- Endangered (IUCN 3.1)

Scientific classification
- Kingdom: Animalia
- Phylum: Chordata
- Class: Actinopterygii
- Order: Gobiiformes
- Family: Gobiidae
- Genus: Silhouettea
- Species: S. sibayi

Binomial name
- Silhouettea sibayi Farquharson, 1970
- IUCN distribution of the Sibayi goby Extant (resident) Probably extant (resident)

Species of fish

Silhouettea sibayi, the Barebreast goby or the Sibayi goby, is a species of goby endemic to southern Africa where it is known from lakes Sibhayi and St. Lucia and Kosi Bay in South Africa, as well as from Piti Lake in Mozambique. It inhabits areas with sandy substrates down to depths of about 20 metres (66 ft) where it lives mostly buried in the sand. This species can reach a length of 4 centimetres (1.6 in) SL.
