= Aegista intonsa =

Conservation status
- Data Deficient (IUCN 2.3)

Scientific classification
- Kingdom: Animalia
- Phylum: Mollusca
- Class: Gastropoda
- Order: Stylommatophora
- Family: Camaenidae
- Genus: Aegista
- Species: A. intonsa

Binomial name
- Aegista intonsa Pilsbry & Hirase, 1902

Synonyms
- Aegista (Aegista) intonsa (Pilsbry & Y. Hirase, 1902)· accepted, alternate representation; Eulota (Aegista) intonsa Pilsbry & Y. Hirase, 1902 (original combination)

Species of gastropod

Aegista intonsa is a species of air-breathing land snail, a terrestrial pulmonate gastropod mollusk in the family Camaenidae.

This species is endemic to Japan.
