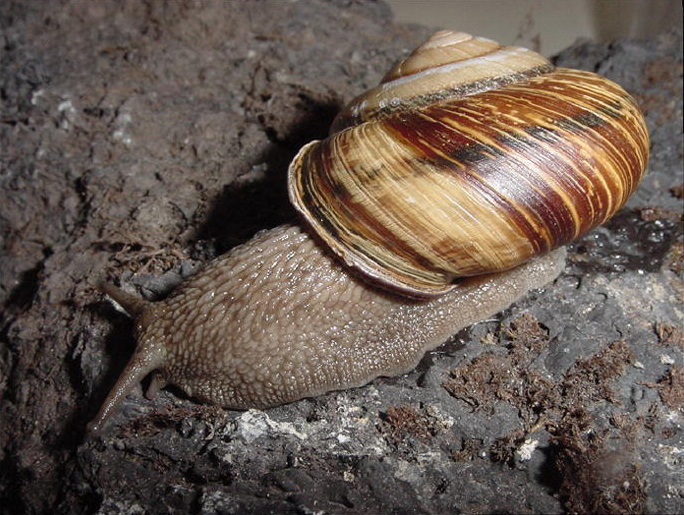
- Euhadra senckenbergiana senckenbergiana

Scientific classification
- Kingdom: Animalia
- Phylum: Mollusca
- Class: Gastropoda
- Order: Stylommatophora
- Family: Camaenidae
- Genus: Euhadra
- Species: E. senckenbergiana

Binomial name
- Euhadra senckenbergiana (Kobelt, 1875)

= Euhadra senckenbergiana =

Species of gastropod

Euhadra senckenbergiana is a species of air-breathing land snail, a terrestrial pulmonate gastropod mollusk in the family Bradybaenidae. This species is found in Japan.

The shell of this species is dextral.

== Subspecies ==
A number of subspecies have been named:

- Euhadra senckenbergiana aomoriensis (Gulick & Pilsbry, 1900)
- Euhadra senckenbergiana ibukicola
- Euhadra senckenbergiana minoensis
- Euhadra senckenbergiana notoensis
- Euhadra senckenbergiana senckenbergiana
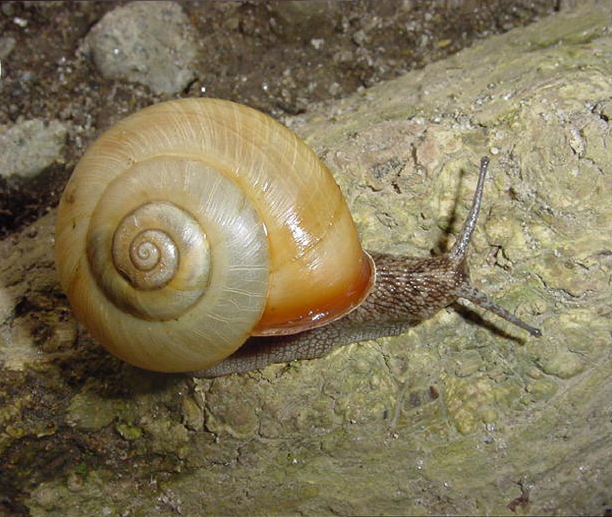
Euhadra senckenbergiana aomoriensis

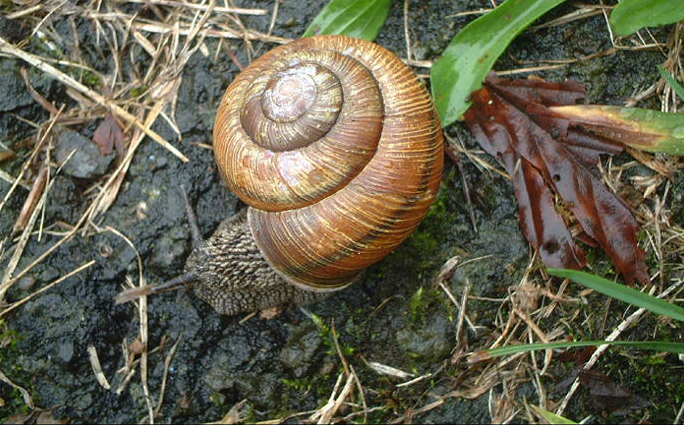
Euhadra senckenbergiana aomoriensis

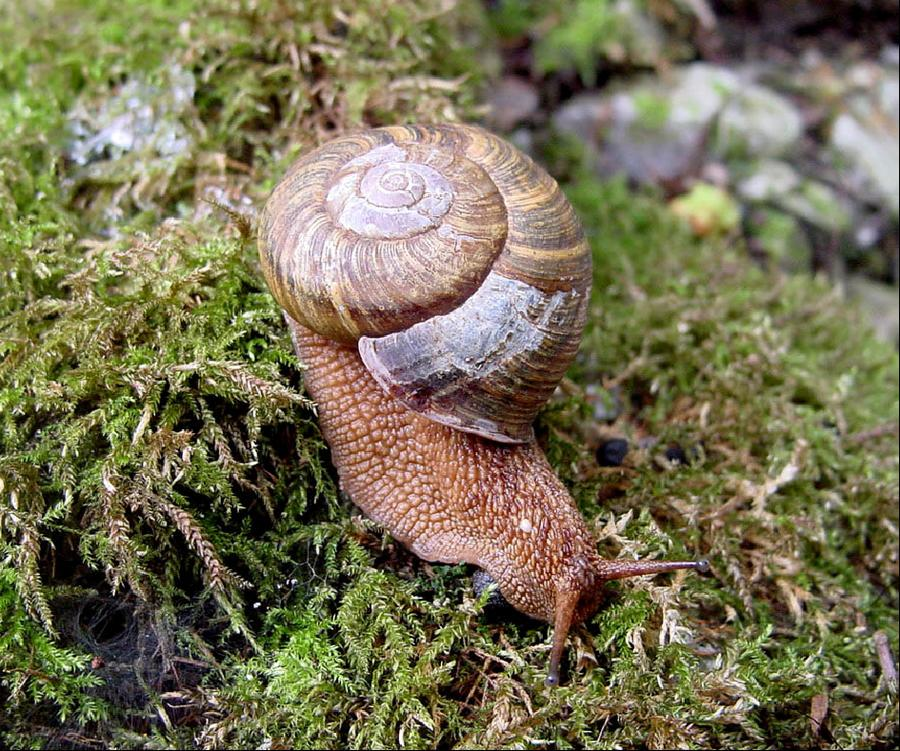
Euhadra senckenbergiana ibukicola

Comparison of the shells of the subspecies:

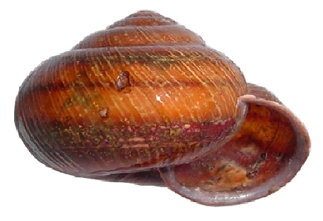
Euhadra senckenbergiana aomoriensis

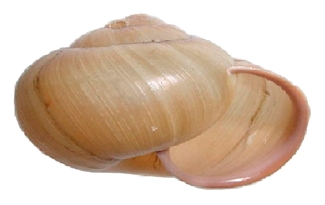
Euhadra senckenbergiana aomoriensis from Tamayama

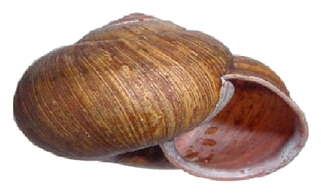
Euhadra senckenbergiana ibukicola

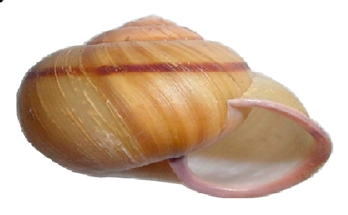
Euhadra senckenbergiana minoensis

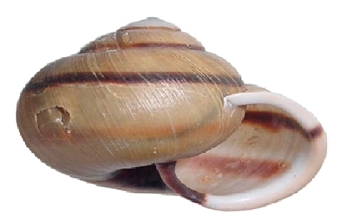
Euhadra senckenbergiana notoensis

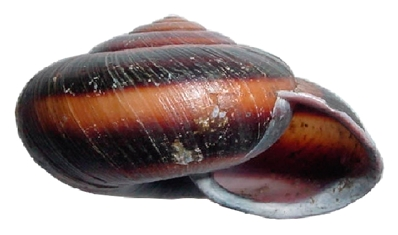
Euhadra senckenbergiana senckenbergiana
