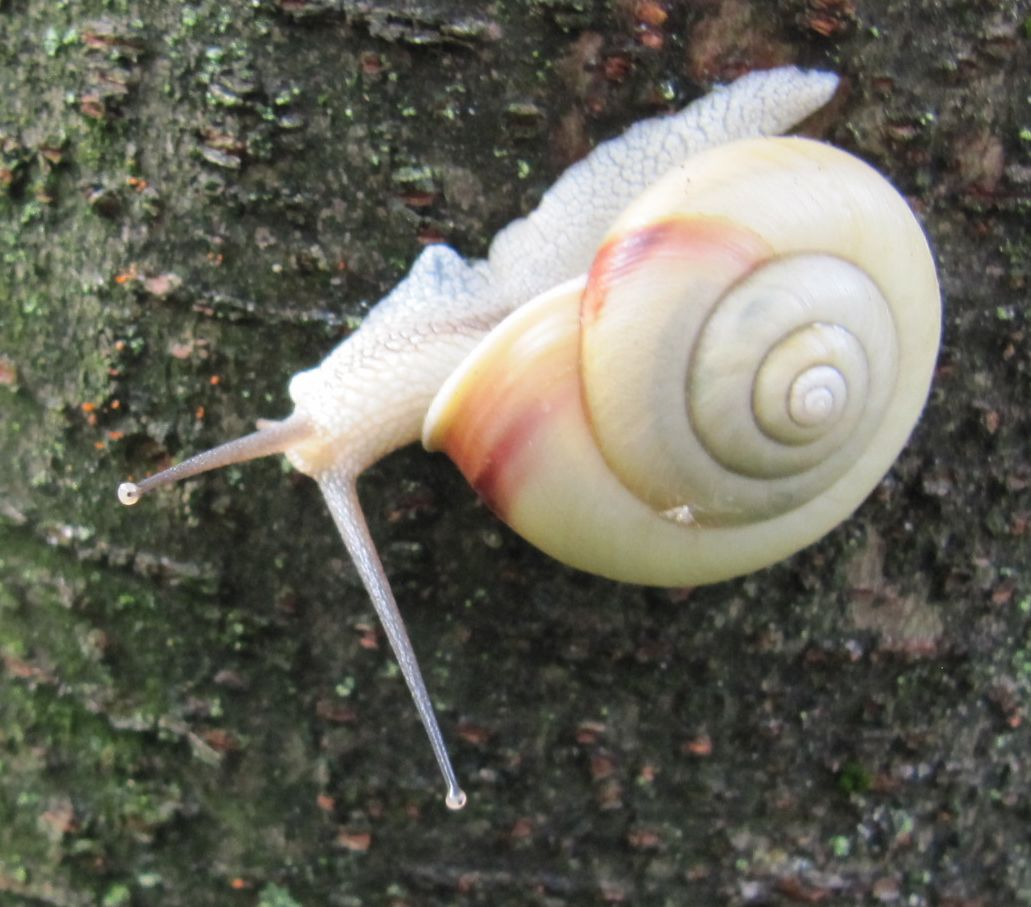
- Euhadra amaliae

Scientific classification
- Kingdom: Animalia
- Phylum: Mollusca
- Class: Gastropoda
- Order: Stylommatophora
- Family: Camaenidae
- Genus: Euhadra
- Species: E. amaliae

Binomial name
- Euhadra amaliae (Kobelt, 1875)

= Euhadra amaliae =

Species of gastropod

Euhadra amaliae is a species of air-breathing land snail, a terrestrial pulmonate gastropod mollusk in the family Bradybaenidae.

== Anatomy ==
This species of snail makes and uses love darts as part of its mating behavior.

== Distribution ==
This snail is endemic to Japan.
