= Euhadra sadoensis =

Conservation status
- Data Deficient (IUCN 2.3)

Scientific classification
- Kingdom: Animalia
- Phylum: Mollusca
- Class: Gastropoda
- Order: Stylommatophora
- Family: Camaenidae
- Genus: Euhadra
- Species: E. sadoensis

Binomial name
- Euhadra sadoensis Pilsbry & Hirase, 1903

Synonyms
- Eulota (Euhadra) sadoensis Pilsbry & Hirase, 1903

Species of gastropod

Euhadra sadoensis is a species of air-breathing land snail, a terrestrial pulmonate gastropod mollusk in the family Bradybaenidae. This species is found in Japan.
