= Red Sea goby =

Conservation status
- Least Concern (IUCN 3.1)

Scientific classification
- Kingdom: Animalia
- Phylum: Chordata
- Class: Actinopterygii
- Order: Gobiiformes
- Family: Gobiidae
- Genus: Silhouettea
- Species: S. aegyptia

Binomial name
- Silhouettea aegyptia (Chabanaud, 1933

Synonyms
- Gobius lesueuri aegyptius Chabanaud, 1933; Minictenogobiops sinaii Goren, 1978

Species of fish

The Red Sea goby (Silhouettea aegyptia) is a species of true goby from the family Gobiidae. It was once a species confined to the Red Sea but it has colonised the Suez Canal and the south-eastern Mediterranean by Lessepsian migration.

== Description ==
The Red Sea goby is marked with many dark vertical spots which have reddish brown edges on a cream background colour. There are 9 or 10 dark spots along the lateral line. It has a short snout and in males the first spine of the first dorsal fin is elongated. There are no scales on the head and nape and there are 24–28 scales in lateral line. It grows to a maximum length of 4–5 centimetres (1.6–2.0 in).

== Distribution ==
The Red Sea goby is native to the northern Red Sea. It was described by Paul Chabanaud in 1933 from type specimens collected in Lake Timsah on the Suez Canal from where it obviously entered the Mediterranean Sea where it was first recorded in Bardawil Lagoon, Egypt, in 1986. It is now rather common from Sinai to Israel.

== Habitat and biology ==
The Red Sea goby can be found on sandy substrates in inshore, shallow waters where it feeds on harpacticoid copepods and nematodes, as well as oligochaetes, gastropods and other meiofauna. This species conceals itself by burying itself into the sand up to the level of its eyes. They probably live no longer than 2 years. They reach sexual maturity at a year old. The breeding season is from February to September, peaking in the Red Sea is from May onwards. Females of 2.7–3.25 centimetres (1.06–1.28 in) SL carry 305–408 eggs; it is a repeat spawner with an extended breeding season.
