= Vitrinula =

Scientific classification
- Kingdom: Animalia
- Phylum: Mollusca
- Class: Gastropoda
- Order: Stylommatophora
- Family: Ariophantidae
- Subfamily: Macrochlamydinae
- Genus: Vitrinula; Gray, 1856

Genus of molluscs

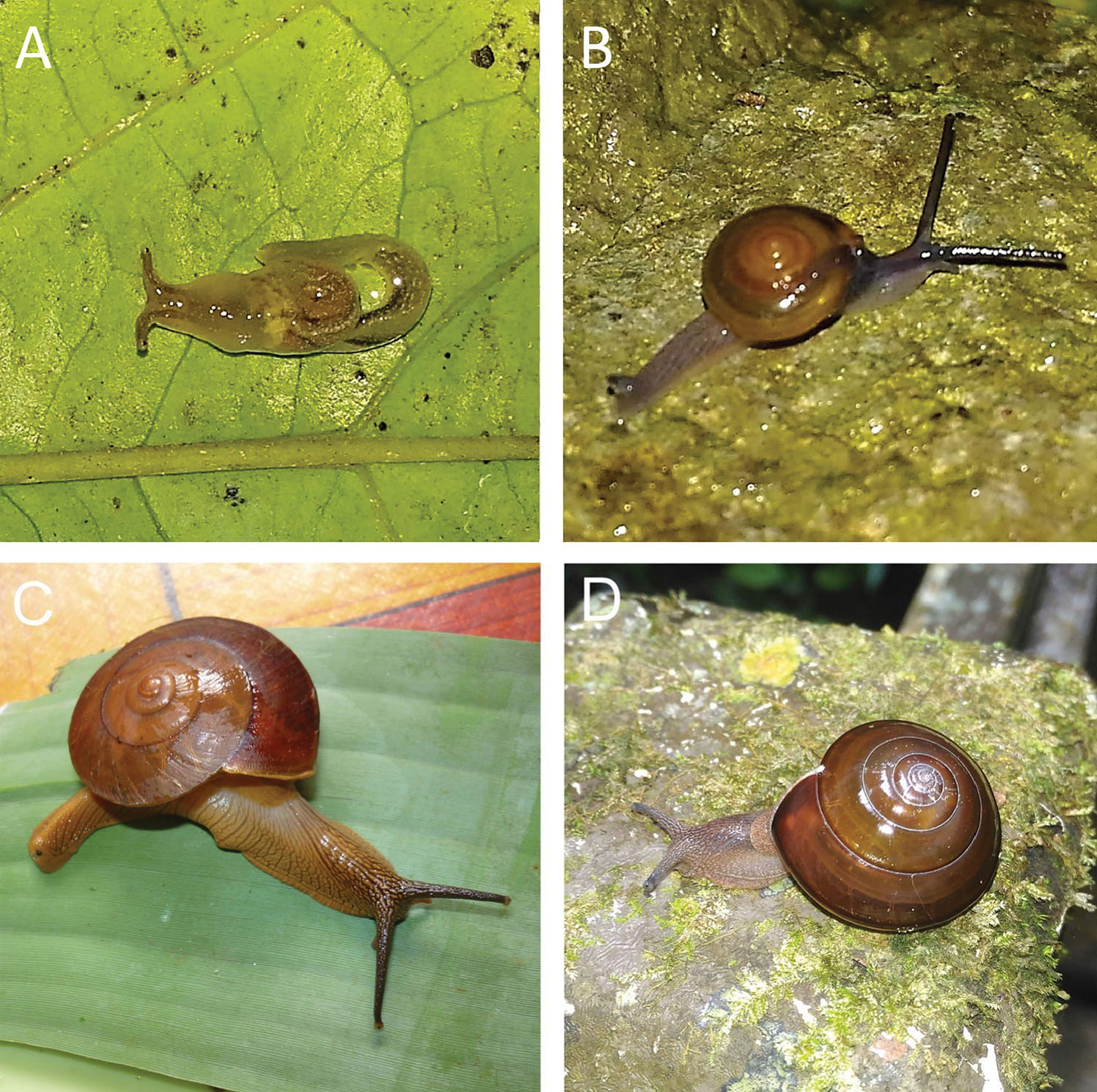
Living snails featuring Damayantia carinata, Macrochlamys tersa, Hemiplecta densa, and Vitrinula glutinosa from locations including Gunung Kapor and Lobang Angin.

Vitrinula was a genus of air-breathing land snails, terrestrial pulmonate gastropod mollusks in the family Ariophantidae. Vitrinula is the type genus of the Vitrinulini, that is a synonym of Macrochlamydinae.

== Species ==
The genus Vitrinula includes the following species:

- Vitrinula chaunax
- Vitrinula chichijimana
- Vitrinula hahajimana
