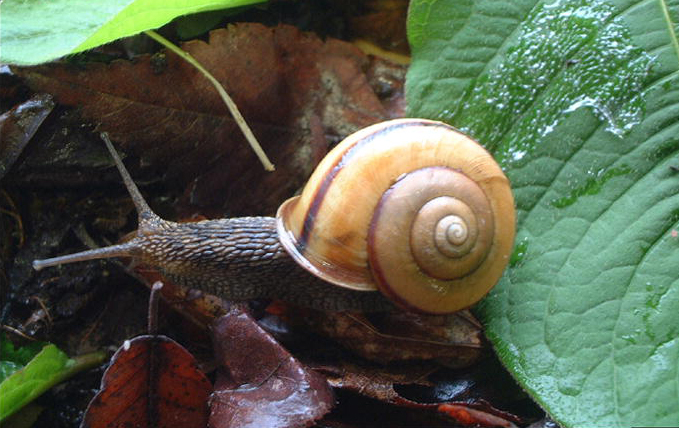
- Euhadra quaesita

Scientific classification
- Kingdom: Animalia
- Phylum: Mollusca
- Class: Gastropoda
- Order: Stylommatophora
- Family: Camaenidae
- Subfamily: Bradybaeninae
- Tribe: Euhadrini
- Genus: Euhadra; Pilsbry, 1890

Synonyms
- Eulota (Euhadra) Pilsbry, 1890; Helix (Euhadra) Pilsbry, 1890

= Euhadra =

Genus of gastropods

Euhadra is a genus of air-breathing land snails, terrestrial pulmonate gastropod mollusks in the subfamily Bradybaeninae of the family Camaenidae.

(This snail genus was previously placed in the family Eulotidae).

A few of the species in this genus are unusual in that specimens in those species always have left-handed "sinistral" coiling in their shells, as shown in the specimen on the right. The rest of the species in the genus are right-handed or "dextral" in the shell coiling, as is usually the case in the great majority of gastropods.

== Distribution ==
These snails are almost endemic to Japan, but one of them are distributed in Korea.

== Species ==
Most species in this genus have a dextral shell and 5 species are sinistral.

=== Dextral species ===
Dextral species in the genus Euhadra include:

- Euhadra amaliae (Kobelt, 1875)
- Euhadra awaensis (Pilsbry, 1902)
- Euhadra brandtii (Kobelt, 1875)
- Euhadra callizona (Crosse, 1871)
- Euhadra caspari (Möllendorff, 1884)
- Euhadra cecillei (Philippi, 1849)
- Euhadra congenita (E. A. Smith, 1878)
- Euhadra cyclolabris Möllendorff, 1899
- Euhadra dixoni (Pilsbry, 1900)
- Euhadra eoa (Crosse, 1868)
- Euhadra granulifera (Möllendorff, 1888)
- Euhadra herklotsi (Martens, 1861)
- Euhadra idzumonis (Pilsbry & Gulick, 1900)
- Euhadra kunoensis Kuroda in Masuda & Habe, 1989
- Euhadra latispira (Pilsbry & Hirase, 1909)
  - Euhadra latispira yagurai Kuroda & Habe, 1949
- Euhadra luhuana (G. B. Sowerby I, 1839)
- Euhadra moreletiana (Heude, 1882)
- Euhadra nachicola Kuroda, 1929
- Euhadra nesiotica (Pilsbry, 1902)
- † Euhadra pachya (Pilsbry, 1902)
- Euhadra peliomphala (L. Pfeiffer, 1850)
- Euhadra sadoensis (Pilsbry & Y. Hirase, 1903)
- Euhadra sandai (Kobelt, 1879)
- Euhadra schmackeri (Möllendorff, 1888)
- Euhadra senckenbergiana (Kobelt, 1875)
  - Euhadra senckenbergiana aomoriensis (Gulick & Pilsbry, 1900)
  - Euhadra senckenbergiana ibukicola
  - Euhadra senckenbergiana notoensis
  - Euhadra senckenbergiana minoensis
  - Euhadra senckenbergiana senckenbergiana
- Euhadra sigeonis Kuroda, 1944
- Euhadra subnimbosa (Kobelt, 1894)
- † Euhadra takarajimana M. Azuma & Y. Azuma, 1985
- Euhadra tokarainsula Minato & Habe, 1982
- Euhadra yakushimana (Pilsbry & Hirase, 1903)
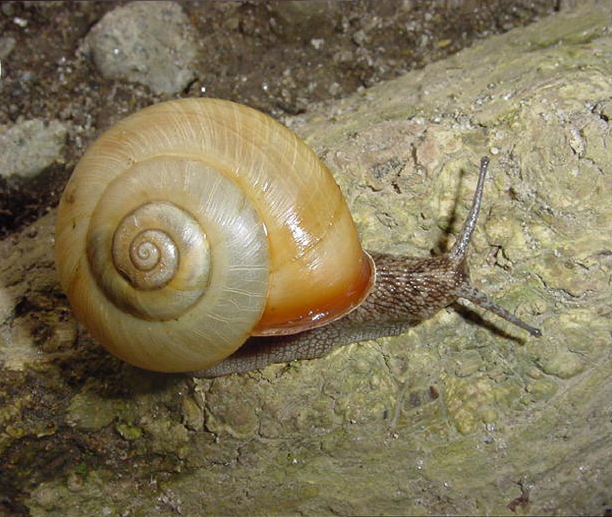
Euhadra senckenbergiana aomoriensis

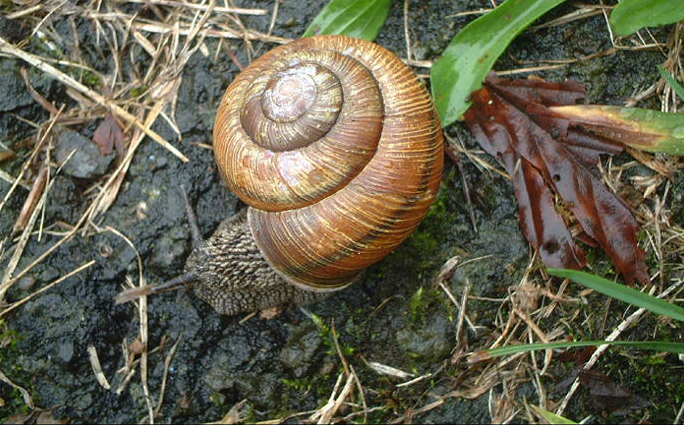
Euhadra senckenbergiana aomoriensis

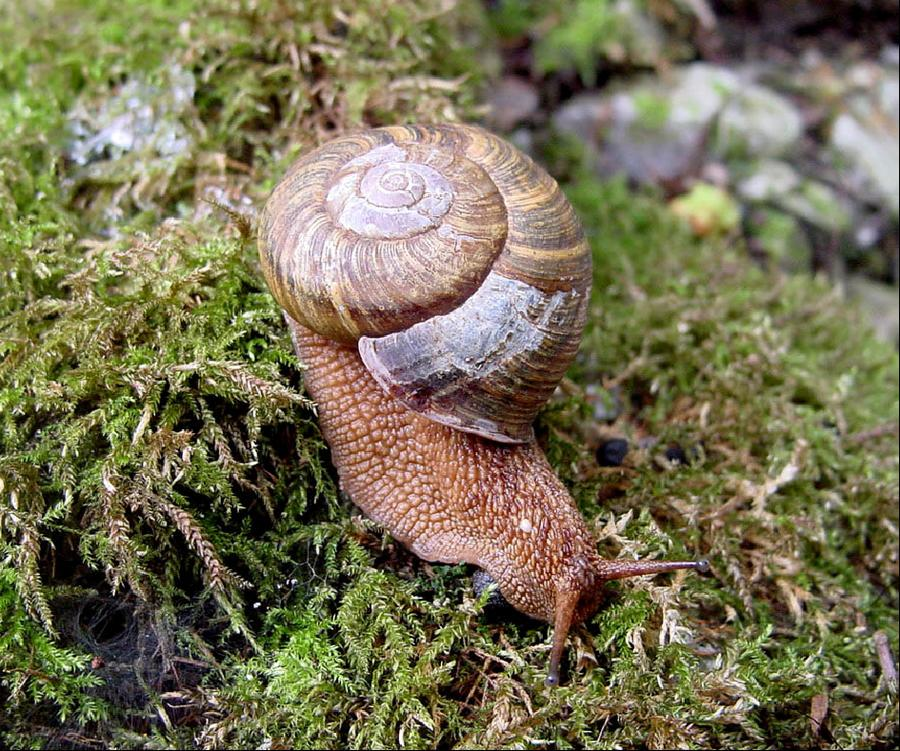
Euhadra senckenbergiana ibukicola

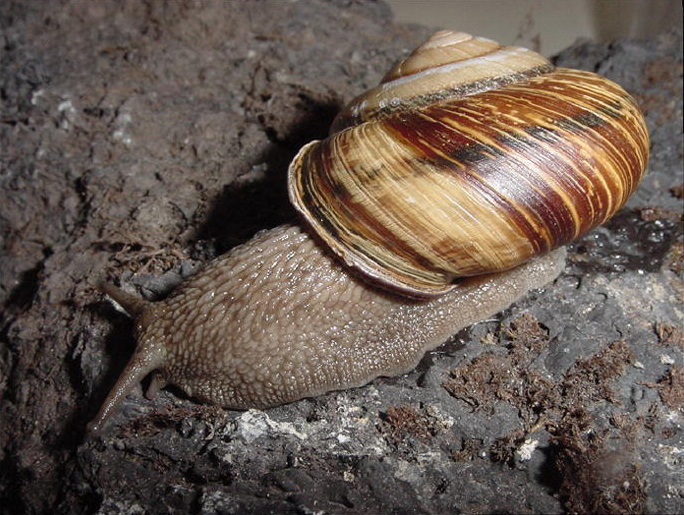
Euhadra senckenbergiana senckenbergiana

=== Sinistral species ===
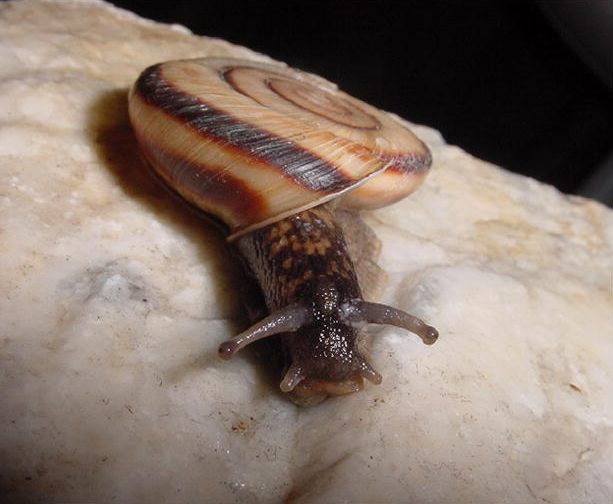
Euhadra murayamai

Sinistral species in the genus Euhadra include:

- Euhadra decorata (Pilsbry & Hirase, 1903)
- Euhadra grata (Gude, 1900)
  - Euhadra grata echigoensis Murayama, Takizawa & Habe, 1991
- Euhadra murayamai Habe, 1976
- Euhadra quaesita (Deshayes, 1850), Sought-after False Hadra
- Euhadra scaevola (Martens, 1877)

Species brought into synonymy

- Euhadra amphidroma Möllendorff, 1899: synonym of Trichocathaica amphidroma (Möllendorff, 1899) (original combination)
- Euhadra carphochroa Möllendorff, 1899: synonym of Bradybaena carphochroa (Möllendorff, 1899) (original combination)
- Euhadra eris Möllendorff, 1899: synonym of Bradybaena eris (Möllendorff, 1899) (original combination)
- Euhadra halpozona Möllendorff, 1899: synonym of Bradybaena halpozona (Möllendorff, 1899) (original combination)
- Euhadra hickonis Kobelt, 1879: synonym of Euhadra congenita (E. A. Smith, 1878) (junior synonym)
- Euhadra iwadensis Toba & Kuroda, 1936: synonym of Euhadra decorata decorata (Pilsbry & Hirase, 1903) (junior synonym)
- Euhadra kanmuriensis Azuma & Tada, 1969: synonym of Euhadra sandai communis Pilsbry, 1928 (junior synonym)
- Euhadra kanoi Kuroda, 1932: synonym of Nesiohelix kanoi (Kuroda, 1932) (original combination)
- Euhadra koreana (L. Pfeiffer, 1850): synonym of Fruticicola koreana (L. Pfeiffer, 1850)
- Euhadra micromphala Möllendorff, 1899: synonym of Bradybaena micromphala (Möllendorff, 1899) (original combination)
- Euhadra pekanensis H. Rolle, 1911: synonym of Satsuma pekanensis (H. Rolle, 1911) (original combination)
- Euhadra pseudocampylaea Möllendorff, 1899: synonym of Bradybaena pseudocampylaea (Möllendorff, 1899) (original combination)
- Euhadra pseudopapuina Möllendorff, 1901: synonym of Aegista pseudopapuina (Möllendorff, 1901) (original combination)
- Euhadra strauchiana Möllendorff, 1899: synonym of Bradybaena strauchiana (Möllendorff, 1899) (original combination)
- Euhadra strictotaenia Möllendorff, 1899: synonym of Bradybaena strictotaenia (Möllendorff, 1899) (original combination)
- Euhadra tenuitesta Möllendorff, 1899: synonym of Bradybaena tenuitesta (Möllendorff, 1899) (original combination)
- Euhadra tobai S. Hirase, 1929: synonym of Euhadra decorata decorata (Pilsbry & Hirase, 1903) (junior synonym)
- Euhadra tokarana Azuma, 1982: synonym of Euhadra tokarainsula tokarainsula Minato & Habe, 1982
