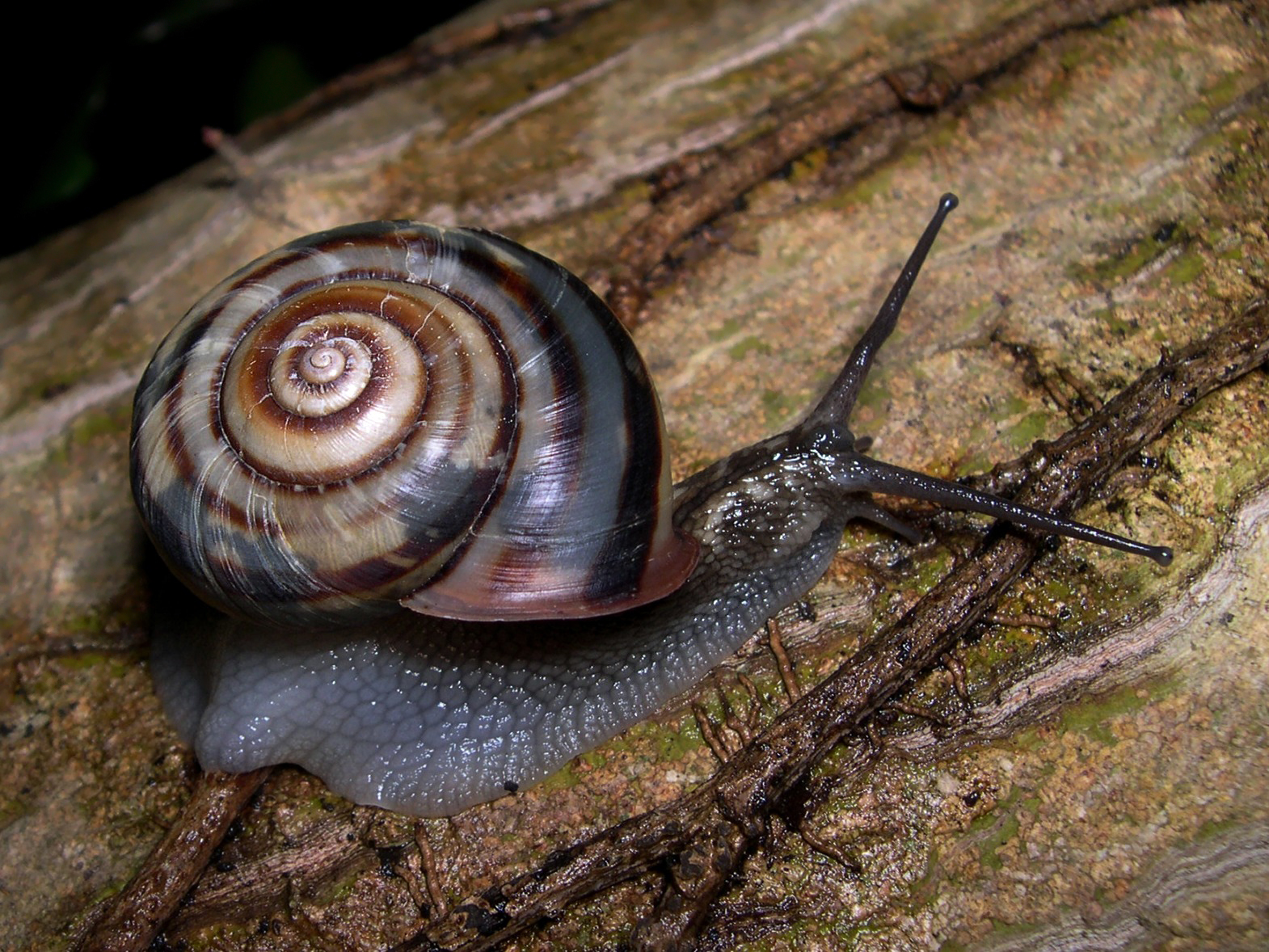
- Euhadra peliomphala from Yokohama, Kanagawa Prefecture

Scientific classification
- Kingdom: Animalia
- Phylum: Mollusca
- Class: Gastropoda
- Order: Stylommatophora
- Family: Camaenidae
- Genus: Euhadra
- Species: E. peliomphala

Binomial name
- Euhadra peliomphala (Pfeiffer, 1850)

= Euhadra peliomphala =

Species of gastropod

Crawling in Kanagawa, Japan in 2025

Euhadra peliomphala is a species of air-breathing land snail, a terrestrial pulmonate gastropod mollusk in the family Bradybaenidae.

This species is endemic to Japan. The species exhibits exceptional geographical variation in its mitochondrial DNA.

== Subspecies ==
Euhadra peliomphala has 4 subspecies:

- Euhadra peliomphala kunoensis Kuroda in Masuda & Habe, 1989
- Euhadra peliomphala nimbosa (Crosse, 1868)
- Euhadra peliomphala peliomphala (Pfeiffer, 1850)
- Euhadra peliomphala simodae (Jay, 1856)

== Hormonal control ==
As Euhadra peliomphala matures sexually, it develops a "head-wart" between the optic tentacles. The development of the "head-wart" parallels the development of the snail's reproductive system. The "head-wart" releases the steroid hormone, testosterone, throughout the body before mating.
