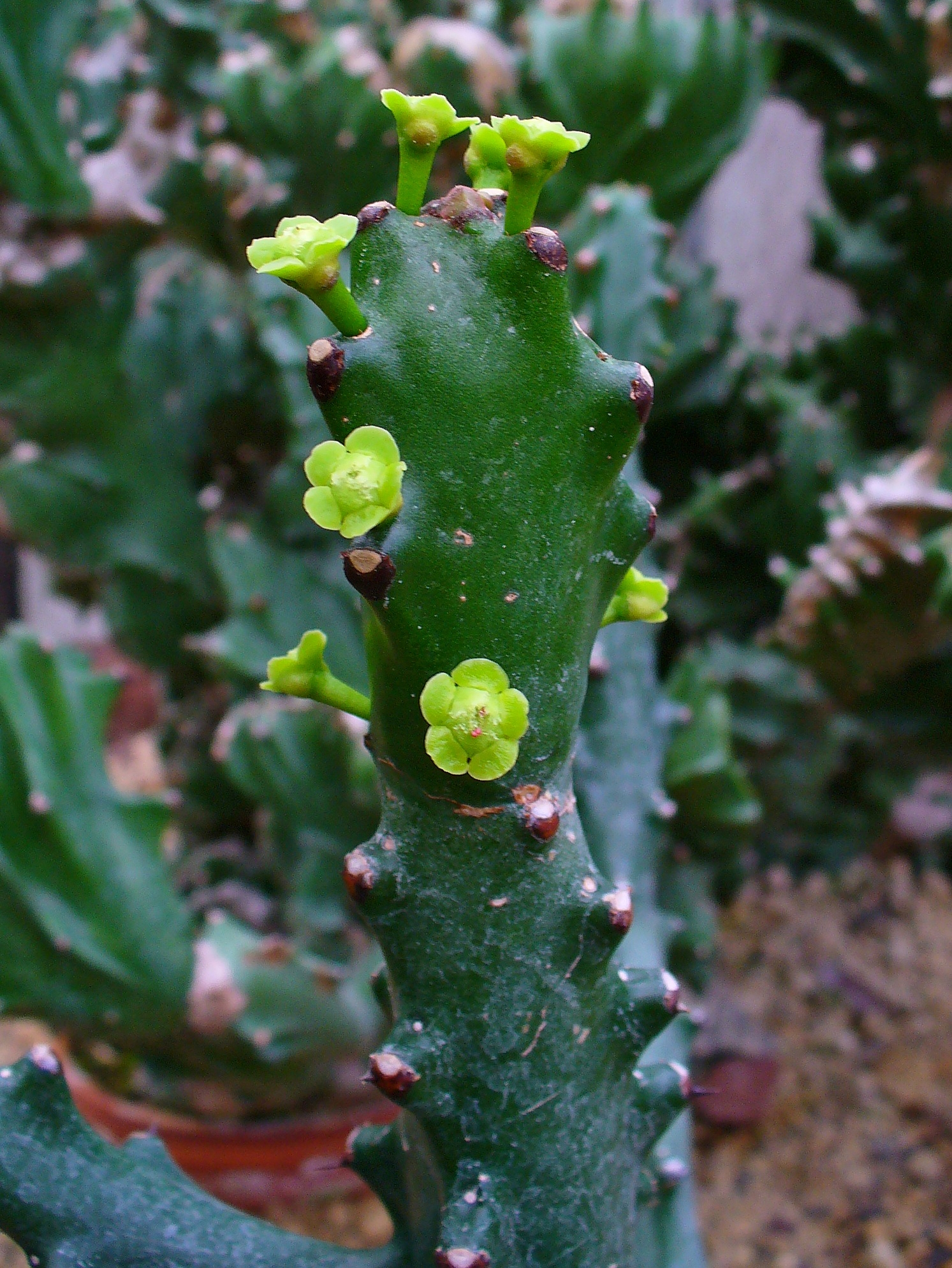

Conservation status
- Extinct in the Wild (IUCN 2.3)

Scientific classification
- Kingdom: Plantae
- Clade: Tracheophytes
- Clade: Angiosperms
- Clade: Eudicots
- Clade: Rosids
- Order: Malpighiales
- Family: Euphorbiaceae
- Genus: Euphorbia
- Species: E. mayurnathanii

Binomial name
- Euphorbia mayurnathanii Croiz.

= Euphorbia mayurnathanii =

Species of flowering plant

Euphorbia mayurnathanii is a species of plant in the family Euphorbiaceae. It was endemic to the Palghat Gap in India, but is now believed to be extinct in the wild. It still exists in cultivation, but international trade is controlled as it is included on Appendix II of CITES.
