= Sharpe's rail =

- Turnaround video of specimen RMNH 87485, Naturalis Biodiversity Center

Scientific classification
- Kingdom: Animalia
- Phylum: Chordata
- Class: Aves
- Order: Gruiformes
- Family: Rallidae
- Genus: Gallirallus
- Species: G. sharpei

Binomial name
- Gallirallus sharpei Büttikofer, 1893

Species of bird

Sharpe's rail (Gallirallus sharpei) is a species of bird in the family Rallidae. It is known only from the type specimen of unknown origin, but it has been speculated that it originated from Indonesia. Due to the lack of recent records, it has been considered extinct, but new evidence suggests it is possibly better regarded as a morph of the buff-banded rail.

The common name and Latin binomial name commemorate the British zoologist Richard Bowdler Sharpe.
