= Mangifera rubropetala =

Conservation status
- Data Deficient (IUCN 3.1)

Scientific classification
- Kingdom: Plantae
- Clade: Tracheophytes
- Clade: Angiosperms
- Clade: Eudicots
- Clade: Rosids
- Order: Sapindales
- Family: Anacardiaceae
- Genus: Mangifera
- Species: M. rubropetala

Binomial name
- Mangifera rubropetala Kosterm.

Species of flowering plant

Mangifera rubropetala is a species of plant in the family Anacardiaceae. Its possible range includes Borneo and Sumatra.
