= Vitrinula chichijimana =

Conservation status
- Extinct (IUCN 2.3)

Scientific classification
- Kingdom: Animalia
- Phylum: Mollusca
- Class: Gastropoda
- Order: Stylommatophora
- Family: Ariophantidae
- Genus: Vitrinula
- Species: †V. chichijimana

Binomial name
- †Vitrinula chichijimana (Pilsbry & Y. Hirase, 1905)

Extinct species of gastropod

Vitrinula chichijimana is an extinct species of air-breathing land snail, a terrestrial gastropod mollusc in the family Ariophantidae. This species was endemic to Japan.
