= Silhouettea =

Scientific classification
- Kingdom: Animalia
- Phylum: Chordata
- Class: Actinopterygii
- Order: Gobiiformes
- Family: Gobiidae
- Genus: Silhouettea; J. L. B. Smith, 1959

Type species
- Silhouettea insinuans J. L. B. Smith, 1959

Synonyms
- Minictenogobiops Goren, 1978

Genus of fishes

Silhouettea is a genus of gobies native to the Indian Ocean and the western Pacific Ocean. The name of this genus refers to the island of Silhouette in the Seychelles where the type specimens of the type species, Silhouettea insinuans, were collected.

== Species ==
There are currently 10 recognized species in this genus:

- Silhouettea aegyptia (Chabanaud, 1933) (Red Sea goby)
- Silhouettea capitlineta J. E. Randall, 2008
- Silhouettea chaimi Goren, 1978
- Silhouettea dotui (Takagi, 1957)
- Silhouettea evanida Larson & P. J. Miller, 1986
- Silhouettea hoesei Larson & P. J. Miller, 1986
- Silhouettea indica Visweswara Rao, 1971
- Silhouettea insinuans J. L. B. Smith, 1959 (Phantom goby)
- Silhouettea nuchipunctatus (Herre, 1934)
- Silhouettea sibayi Farquharson, 1970 (Barebreast goby)
