= List of non-marine molluscs of Japan =

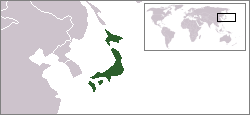
Location of Japan

The non-marine molluscs of Japan are a part of the molluscan fauna of Japan (wildlife of Japan).

A number of species of non-marine molluscs are found in the wild in Japan.

Extinct gastropods in Japan include: Vitrinula chaunax, Vitrinula chichijimana, Vitrinula hahajimana.

== Freshwater gastropods ==
Pomatiopsidae

- Oncomelania hupensis Gredler, 1881

Thiaridae

- Melanoides tuberculata (O. F. Müller, 1774) - red-rimmed melania

Acroloxidae

- Acroloxus orientalis Kruglov et Starobogatov, 1991

== Land gastropods ==
Land gastropods in Japan include:

Cyclophoridae

- Cyclophorus herklotsi Martens, 1861

Helicinidae

- Ogasawarana discrepans – endemic

Achatinellidae

- Elasmias kitaiwojimanum – endemic

Enidae

- Boninena callistoderma – endemic
- Boninena hiraseana – endemic
- Boninena ogasawarae – endemic
- Luchuena hachijoensis Kuroda, 1945 – endemic

Vertiginidae

- Hypselostoma insularum Pilsbry, 1908 – Ryukyu Islands

Ariophantidae

- Vitrinula chaunax – extinct
- Vitrinula chichijimana – extinct
- Vitrinula hahajimana – extinct

Camaenidae

- Aegista hiroshifukudai Hirano, Kameda & Chiba, 2015
- Aegista intonsa – endemic
- Plectotropis inexpectata – endemic
- Euhadra amaliae (Kobelt, 1875)
- Euhadra awaensis (Pilsbry, 1902)
- Euhadra brandtii (Kobelt, 1875)
- Euhadra callizona (Crosse, 1871)
- Euhadra caspari (Möllendorff, 1884)
- Euhadra cecillei (Philippi, 1849)
- Euhadra congenita (E. A. Smith, 1878)
- Euhadra cyclolabris Möllendorff, 1899
- Euhadra dixoni (Pilsbry, 1900)
- Euhadra eoa (Crosse, 1868)
- Euhadra granulifera (Möllendorff, 1888)
- Euhadra herklotsi (Martens, 1861)
- Euhadra idzumonis (Pilsbry & Gulick, 1900)
- Euhadra kunoensis Kuroda in Masuda & Habe, 1989
- Euhadra latispira (Pilsbry & Hirase, 1909)
  - Euhadra latispira yagurai Kuroda & Habe, 1949 [1]
- Euhadra luhuana (G. B. Sowerby I, 1839)
- Euhadra moreletiana (Heude, 1882)
- Euhadra nachicola Kuroda, 1929
- Euhadra nesiotica (Pilsbry, 1902)
- † Euhadra pachya (Pilsbry, 1902)
- Euhadra peliomphala (L. Pfeiffer, 1850)
- Euhadra sadoensis (Pilsbry & Y. Hirase, 1903)
- Euhadra sandai (Kobelt, 1879)
- Euhadra schmackeri (Möllendorff, 1888)
- Euhadra senckenbergiana (Kobelt, 1875)
  - Euhadra senckenbergiana aomoriensis (Gulick & Pilsbry, 1900)
  - Euhadra senckenbergiana ibukicola
  - Euhadra senckenbergiana notoensis
  - Euhadra senckenbergiana minoensis
  - Euhadra senckenbergiana senckenbergiana
- Euhadra sigeonis Kuroda, 1944
- Euhadra subnimbosa (Kobelt, 1894)
- † Euhadra takarajimana M. Azuma & Y. Azuma, 1985
- Euhadra tokarainsula Minato & Habe, 1982
- Euhadra yakushimana (Pilsbry & Hirase, 1903)

Diapheridae

- Sinoennea Kobelt, 1904

== See also ==
Lists of molluscs of surrounding countries:

- List of non-marine molluscs of Russia, Wildlife of Russia
- List of non-marine molluscs of North Korea, Wildlife of North Korea
- List of non-marine molluscs of South Korea, Wildlife of South Korea
- List of non-marine molluscs of China, Wildlife of China
