= Laughing tree frog (disambiguation) =

The laughing tree frog (Litoria peronii) is a common tree frog in the family Hylidae found in South Australia, New South Wales, Queensland and Victoria, Australia.

Laughing tree frog may also refer to:

- Northern laughing tree frog (Litoria rothii), a frog in the family Hylidae native to northern Australia
- Southern laughing tree frog (Litoria tyleri), a frog in the family Hylidae native to coastal southeast Queensland and the south coast of New South Wales, Australia
