= Laughing frog (disambiguation) =

The Laughing Frog is a 2002 Japanese film directed by Hideyuki Hirayama.

Laughing frog may also refer to:

- Jamaican laughing frog, a frog endemic to Jamaica
- Laughing tree frog, a frog found in Australia
- Northern laughing tree frog, a frog native to northern Australia
- Southern laughing tree frog, a frog native to eastern Australia
- Marsh frog, whose Latin name (Pelophylax ridibundus) translates as "laughing water frog"
