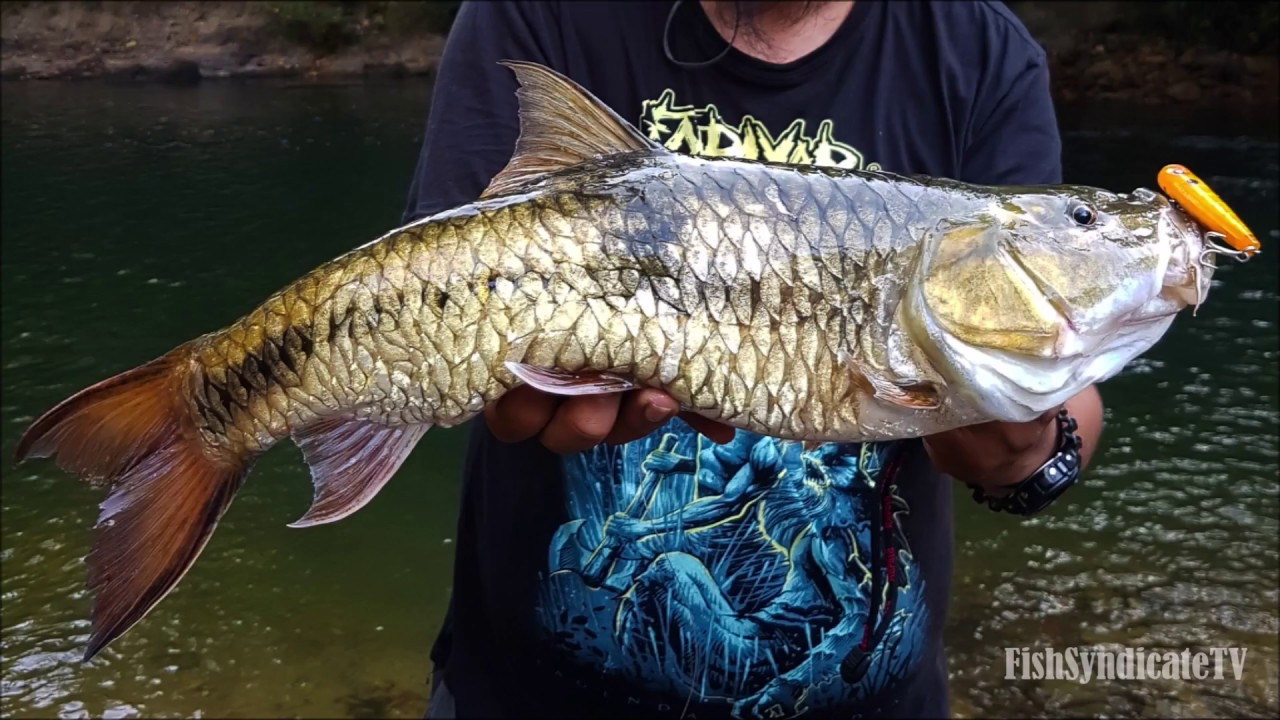

Conservation status
- Least Concern (IUCN 3.1)

Scientific classification
- Kingdom: Animalia
- Phylum: Chordata
- Class: Actinopterygii
- Order: Cypriniformes
- Family: Cyprinidae
- Genus: Hampala
- Species: H. sabana

Binomial name
- Hampala sabana Inger & P. K. Chin, 1962

= Hampala sabana =

Species of fish

Hampala sabana is a species of cyprinid in the genus Hampala that is native to Malaysia

== Description ==
This species reaches a maximum length of 41.0 centimetres (16.1 in) and has a distinctive single dark band below the dorsal fin similar to that of Barbodes sellifer. Although a second dark mark may develop at the base of the tail as it reaches maturity, with a dark line along the lateral line connecting the two marks. Depending on the habitat, the fins may be a light cream color or a dark orange-red.

== Distribution and habitat ==
Endemic to the Malaysian state of Sabah, it is predominately found in the central-eastern region of the state in which it dominates its range from others of its genus.

The usual habitat of this species comprises clear and well-oxygenated running waters with substrates of sand, gravel, rock, or mud. Such habitats are usually tropical rainforest rivers and stream catchments but due to development these habitats are modified and converted to palm or rubber plantations, they can still survive in these habitats but in much lower abundance, making them rare

== Ecology ==
As an active predator, it predominately feeds on other fish, frogs, and insects, preferring to inhabit deep and slower river stretches to ambush unsuspecting prey.

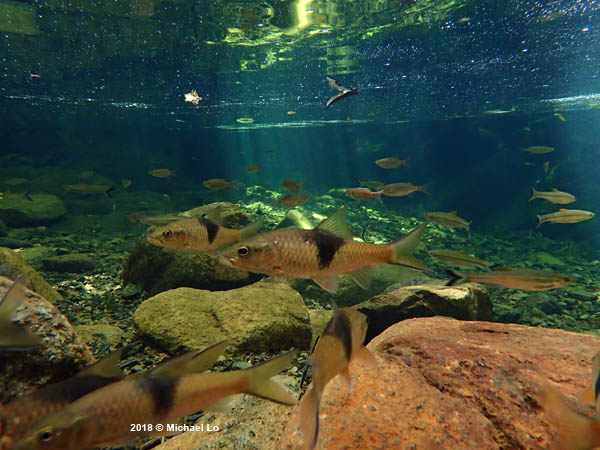
Hampala sabana, Nematabramis everetii and Rasbora sumatrana from Sabah, north Borneo

It's been observed to school together when young (even with other species like Rasbora sumatrana and Nematabramis everetii), and this behavior may possibly be continued throughout its life.

In the Segama river system, it has been found to live sympatricly with other species such as Luciosoma pellegrini, Nematabramis everetti, Garra borneensis, Gastromyzon lepidogaster, Mystus sabanus, and Pangasius tubbi.
