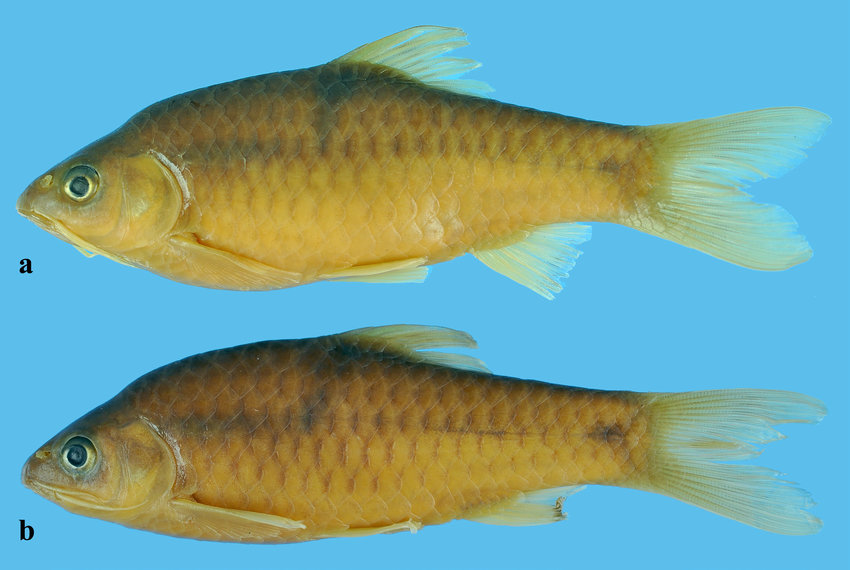

Scientific classification
- Kingdom: Animalia
- Phylum: Chordata
- Class: Actinopterygii
- Order: Cypriniformes
- Family: Cyprinidae
- Genus: Barbodes
- Species: B. zakariaismaili

Binomial name
- Barbodes zakariaismaili M.Kottelat and Lim, Kelvin (2021)

= Barbodes zakariaismaili =

Species of fish from Malaysia

Barbodes zakariaismaili, or Zakaria's barb, is a newly described species of cyprinid fish as of 2021. The species is native to Malaysia, where it is found in foothills and lowland streams with clear water in the southern Malay Peninsula. The species has very little to no significant commercial value.

Previously thought to be a variant of Barbodes banksi, it and Barbodes sellifer were removed from B. banksi due to its unique color pattern in adulthood and morphological differences.

== Etymology ==
This species is named in honour of Mohd. Zakaria-Ismail, an expert in Malaysia's fish fauna.

== Description ==
Similar to Barbodes binotatus, the overall body coloration is dark yellowish brown, while the back of the fish is darker, and its underside is pale with a yellowish hue.

The feature that distinguishes the species is the triangular black mark below the dorsal fin that stretches to the lateral line, this trait is similar to B. sellifer, but the mark is less broad and less rectangular then B. sellifer, the adults of B. zakariaismaili also sport an additional faint blackish lateral mark running along the lateral line from the gill opening to below the dorsal-fin, a black spot at the base of the caudal fin, an extended and pointed snout, and smaller eyes then B. sellifer.

== Distribution ==
The species has a very small distribution, possibly only present in state of Pahang, Peninsular Malaysia as no other confirm catch records outside of its range have been made as of yet.

== Habitat ==
It prefers slow-moving clearwater forest streams or pools.
