= Calamaria everetti =

Conservation status
- Least Concern (IUCN 3.1)

Scientific classification
- Kingdom: Animalia
- Phylum: Chordata
- Class: Reptilia
- Order: Squamata
- Suborder: Serpentes
- Family: Colubridae
- Genus: Calamaria
- Species: C. everetti

Binomial name
- Calamaria everetti Boulenger, 1893
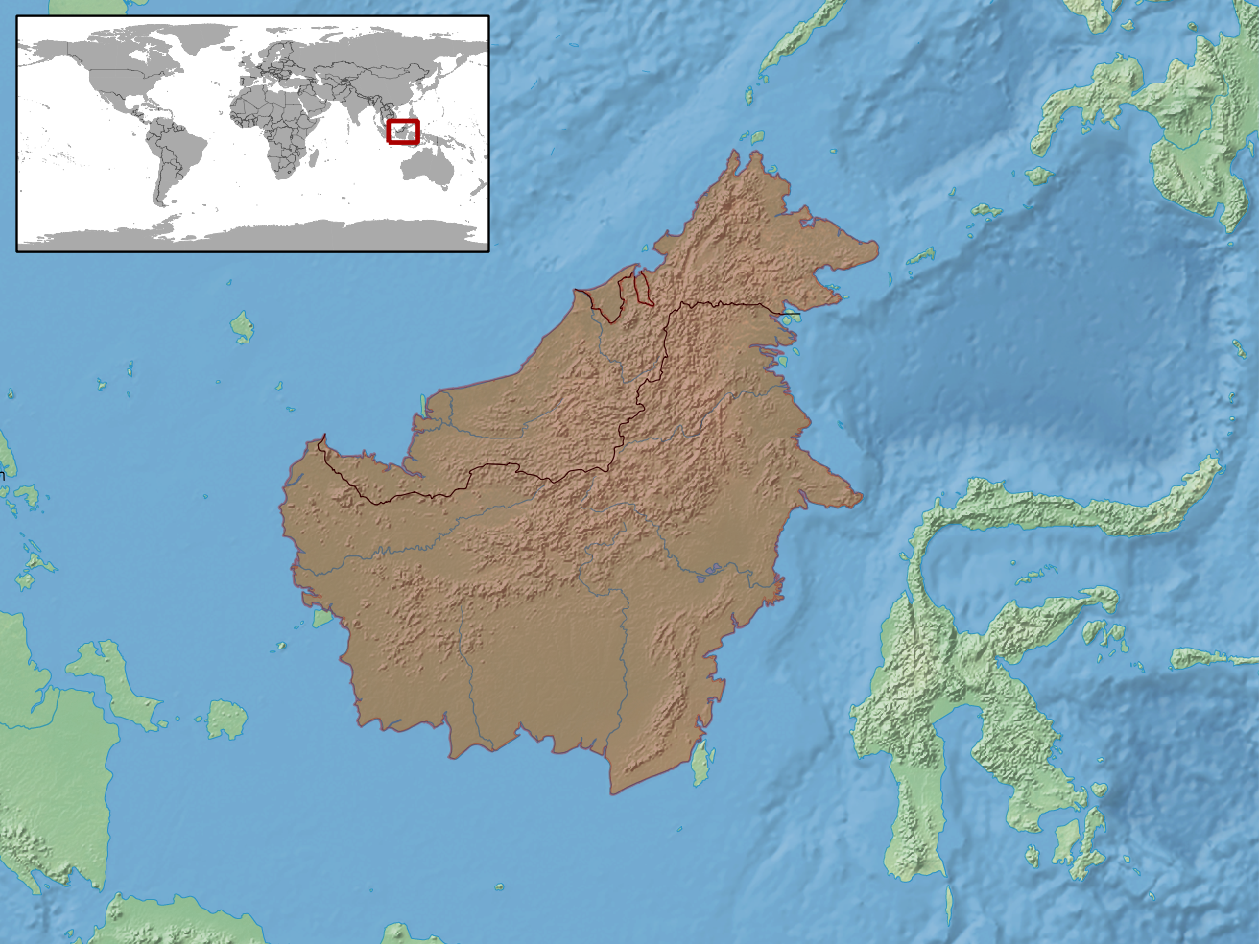

Species of snake

Calamaria everetti, also known commonly as Everett's reed snake, is a species of snake in the subfamily Calamariinae of the family Colubridae. The species is native to Indonesia and Malaysia.

== Etymology ==
The specific name, everetti, is in honor of British colonial administrator Alfred Hart Everett (1848–1898), who collected natural history specimens in the East Indies.

== Habitat ==
The preferred natural habitat of Calamaria everetti is forest, at elevations from near sea level to 1,500 m (4,900 ft).

== Behavior ==
Calamaria everetti is terrestrial, living in the leaf litter on the forest floor.

== Reproduction ==
Calamaria everetti is oviparous.
