= Hampala lopezi =

Conservation status
- Endangered (IUCN 3.1)

Scientific classification
- Kingdom: Animalia
- Phylum: Chordata
- Class: Actinopterygii
- Order: Cypriniformes
- Family: Cyprinidae
- Genus: Hampala
- Species: H. lopezi

Binomial name
- Hampala lopezi Herre, 1924

Species of fish

Hampala lopezi is a species of ray-finned fish in the family Cyprinidae. It is found only in the Philippines.
