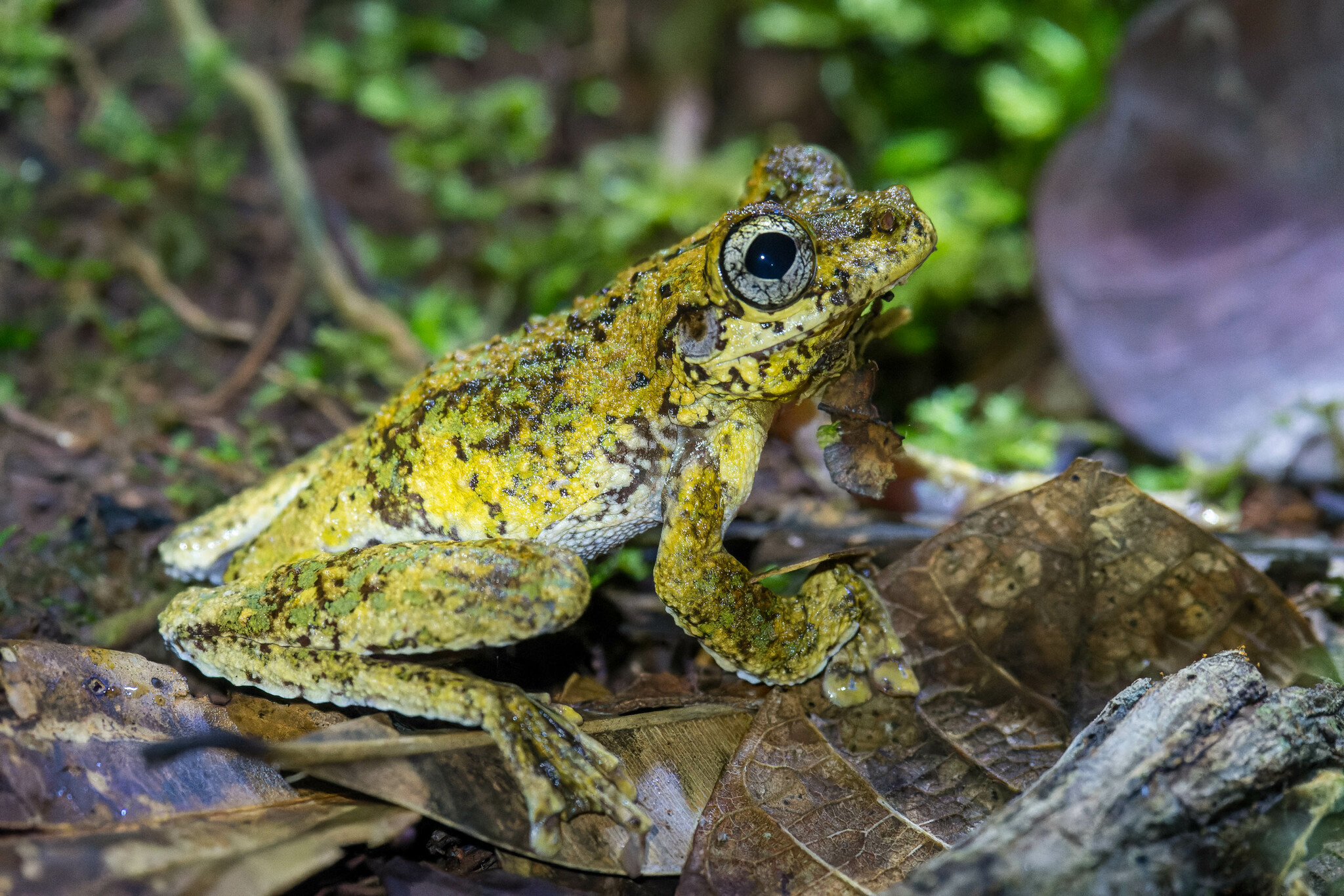
- Horst's tree frog (Pengilleyia amboinensis) in North Fly, Papua New Guinea)

Scientific classification
- Kingdom: Animalia
- Phylum: Chordata
- Class: Amphibia
- Order: Anura
- Family: Pelodryadidae
- Genus: Pengilleyia; Wells & Wellington, 1985

Species
- See text

= Pengilleyia =

Genus of amphibians

Pengilleyia is a genus of medium-sized tree frogs in the family Pelodryadidae. These frogs are native to Australia, New Guinea and eastern Indonesia. Species in the genus were previously included within the wastebasket genus Litoria, but were separated into a resurrected genus in 2025. They are grey to brown frogs, often with a highly mottled surface and sometimes flecks of emerald green.

Most of the species in Pengilleyia were described by science in the late 19th and early 20th centuries, except Tyler's tree frog (P. tyleri), which was long confused with Peron's tree frog (P. peronii) until the different morphology and calls were described in 1979. In 2023, Roth's tree frog was split into an eastern and western species using genetic evidence.

== Species ==
Pengilleyia contains seven species:

Common name	Binomial name
Horst's tree frog	Pengilleyia amboinensis (Horst, 1883)
Darlington's Madang tree frog	Pengilleyia darlingtoni (Loveridge, 1945)
Everett's tree frog	Pengilleyia everetti (Boulenger, 1897)
Peron's tree frog	Pengilleyia peronii (Tschudi, 1838)
Western laughing tree frog	Pengilleyia ridibunda Donnellan, Catullo, Rowley, Doughty, Price, Hines, and Richards, 2023
Roth's tree frog	Pengilleyia rothii (De Vis, 1884)
Tyler's tree frog	Pengilleyia tyleri (Martin, Watson, Gartside, Littlejohn, and Loftus-Hills, 1979)
