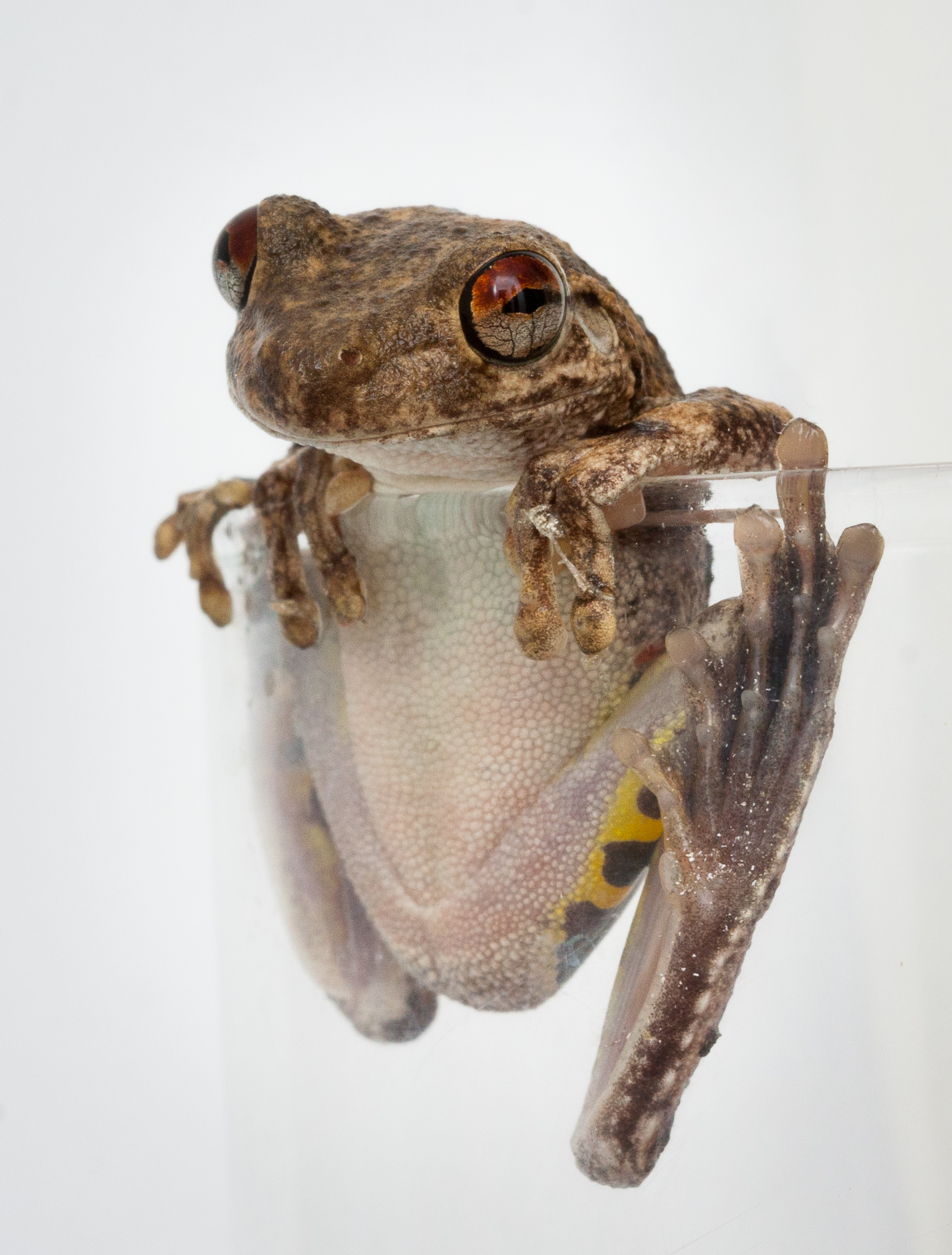

Conservation status
- Least Concern (IUCN 3.1)

Scientific classification
- Kingdom: Animalia
- Phylum: Chordata
- Class: Amphibia
- Order: Anura
- Family: Pelodryadidae
- Genus: Pengilleyia
- Species: P. rothii

Binomial name
- Pengilleyia rothii (De Vis, 1884)

Synonyms
- Hyla rothii De Vis, 1884; Litoria rothii (De Vis, 1884)

= Roth's tree frog =

Species of amphibian

Roth's tree frog (Pengilleyia rothii), or the northern laughing tree frog, is a species of tree frog native to north-eastern Australia and southern Papua New Guinea.

== Description ==
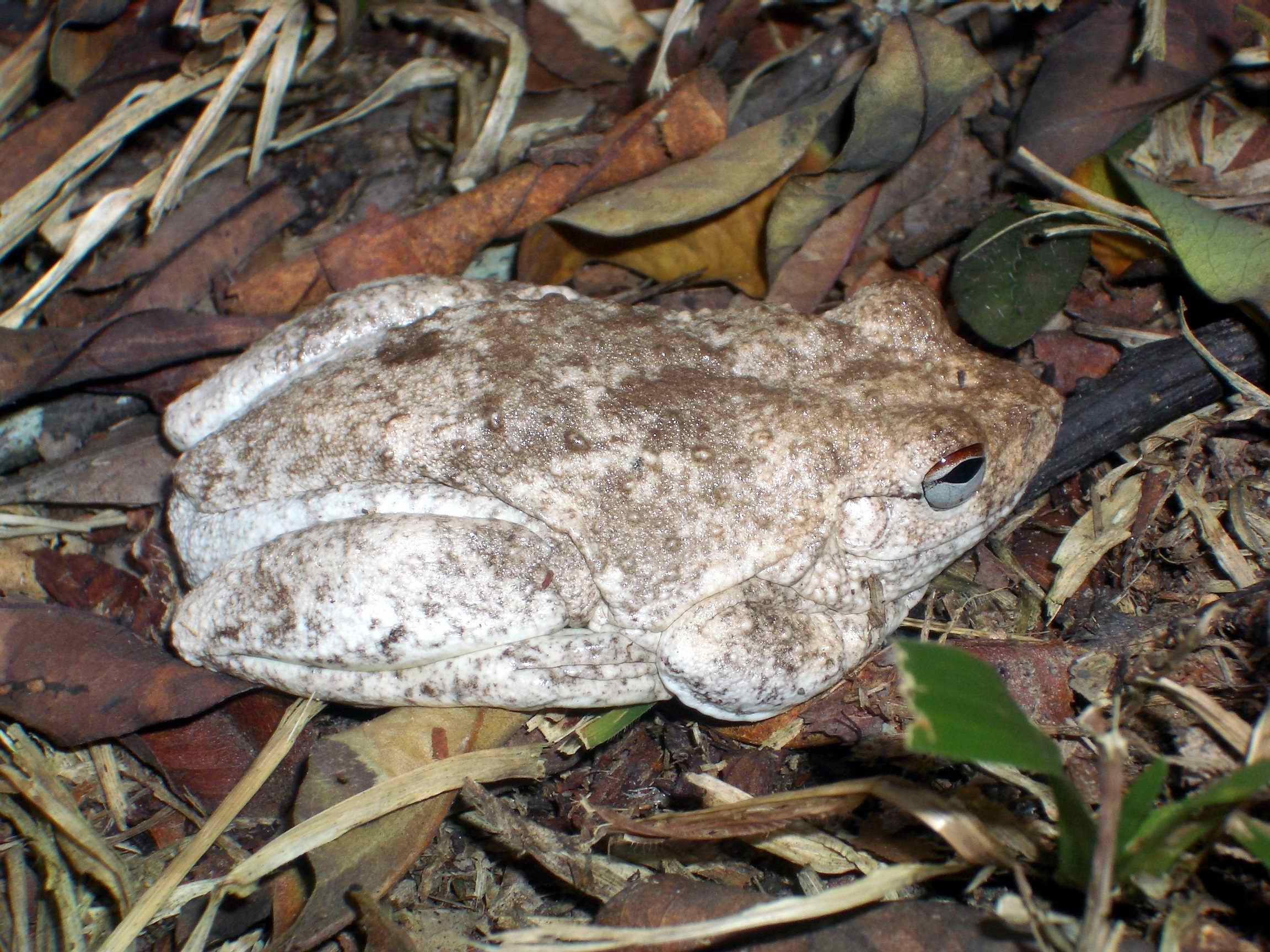

Roth's tree frog is a medium-sized frog, reaching a maximum length of 5.7 cm (2.2 in). The body is elongated, with a small head and large eyes. It is an arboreal frog, and its toe pads are wider than its fingers. The dorsal surface is a dull grey to brown colour, and can be blotched with dark brown. The inner thighs and armpits are black and blotched with bright yellow or orange. The tympanum is visible, with a fold of skin covering the top portion.

There are two features that distinguish it from both Peron's tree frog and Tyler's tree frog - the upper half of the iris is deep red, and it has no emerald green flecks on the dorsal surface.

== Ecology and behaviour ==
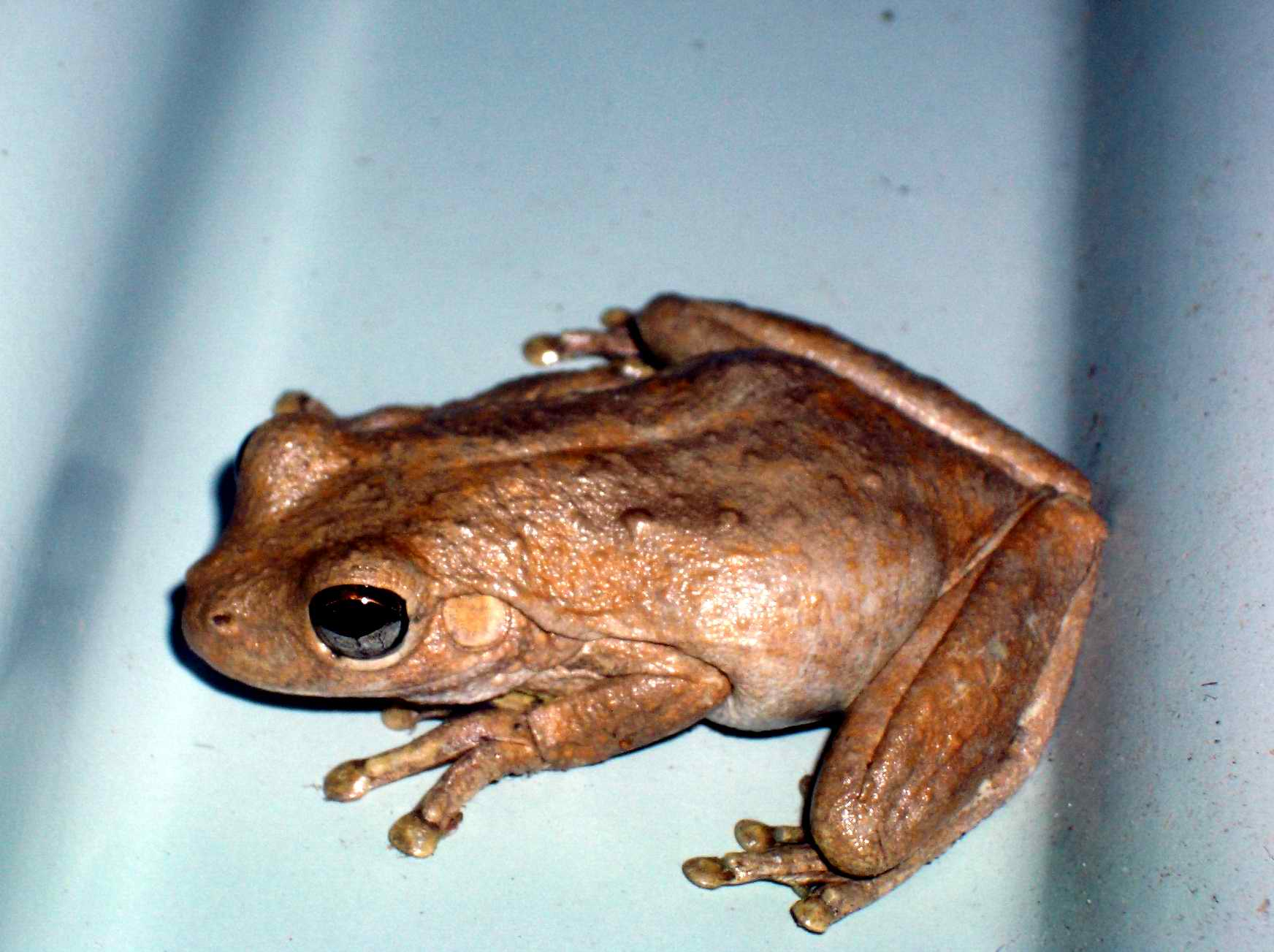
A dark Roth's tree frog with red patches

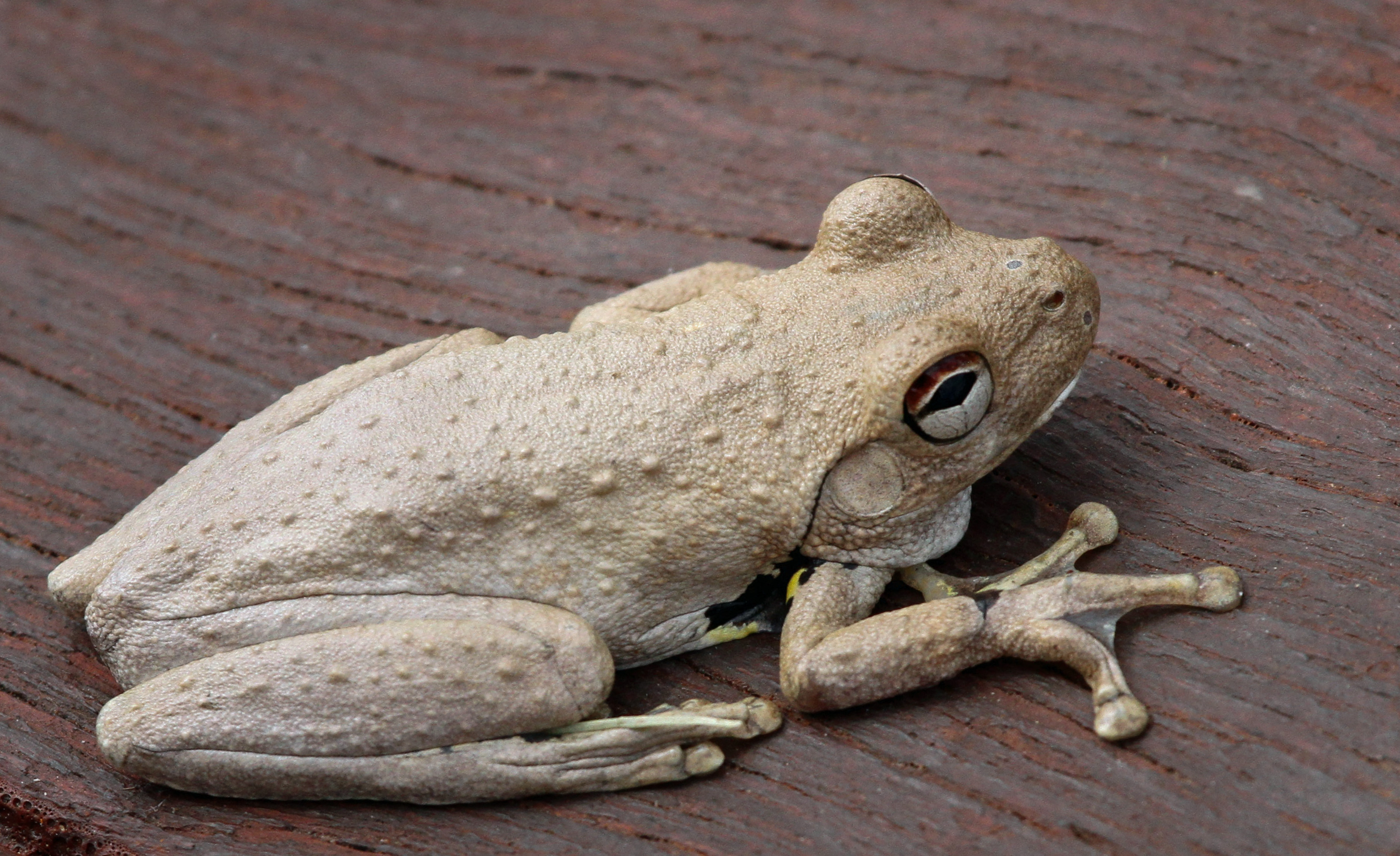

Roth's tree frog breeds during the wet season, from November to March. The call is seven to 9 loud, chuckling or cackling sounds that resemble laughter. Eggs are laid in temporary pools of water, and the tadpoles take a maximum of 65 days to metamorphose.

The colour of Roth's tree frog is extremely variable, and can change from pale grey to dark brown within hours. Typically, they are grey during the day whilst basking in the sun, and are brown at night.
