= Nematabramis borneensis =

Conservation status
- Least Concern (IUCN 3.1)

Scientific classification
- Kingdom: Animalia
- Phylum: Chordata
- Class: Actinopterygii
- Order: Cypriniformes
- Family: Danionidae
- Subfamily: Chedrinae
- Genus: Nematabramis
- Species: N. borneensis

Binomial name
- Nematabramis borneensis Inger & P. K. Chin, 1962

Synonyms
- Nematabramis alestes borneensis Inger & P. K. Chin, 1962

Species of fish

Nematabramis borneensis is a species of freshwater ray-finned fish belonging to the family Danionidae, the danionins or danios. This species is found in northern Borneo. It belongs to the genus Nematabramis. It reaches up to 10.2 cm (4.0 in) in length.
