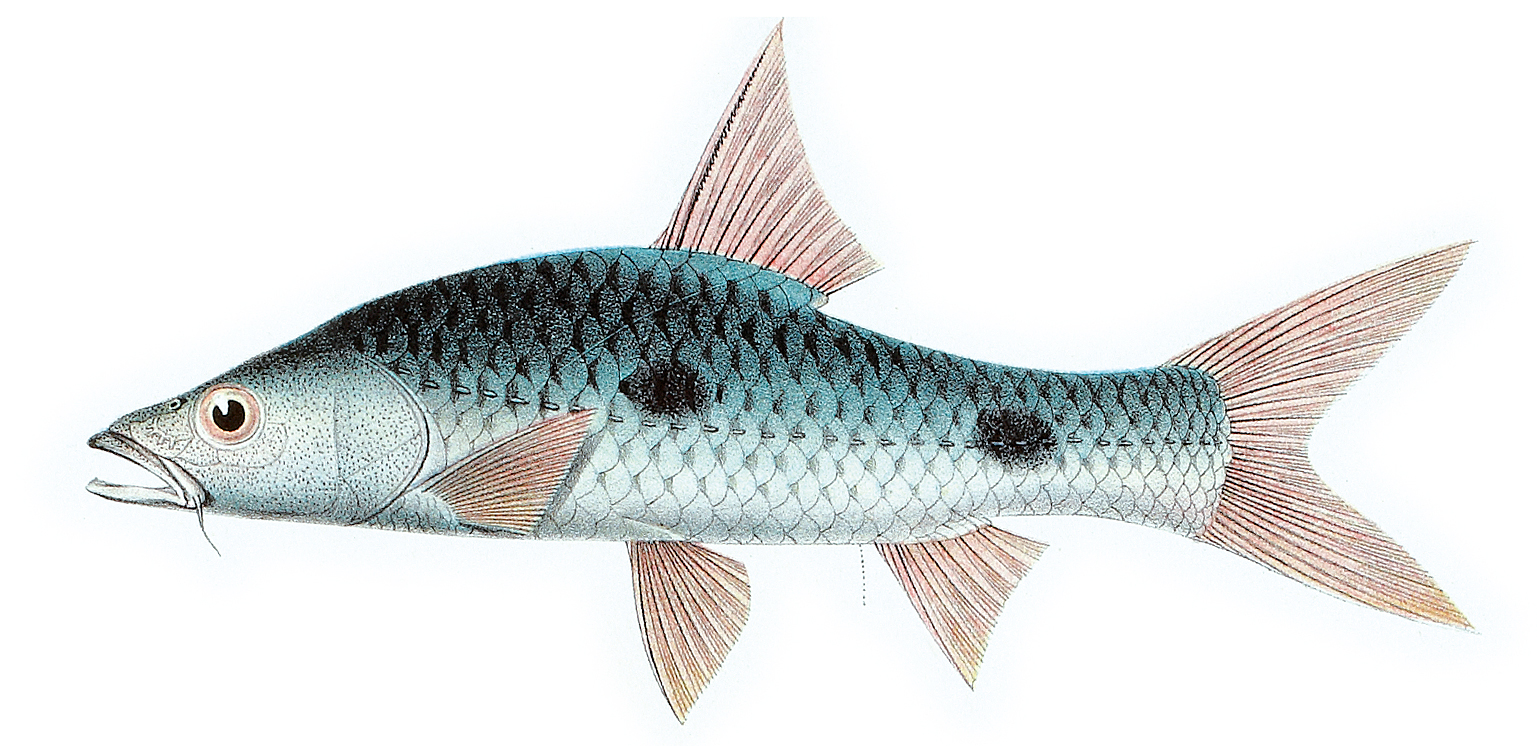

Conservation status
- Least Concern (IUCN 3.1)

Scientific classification
- Kingdom: Animalia
- Phylum: Chordata
- Class: Actinopterygii
- Order: Cypriniformes
- Family: Cyprinidae
- Genus: Hampala
- Species: H. ampalong

Binomial name
- Hampala ampalong (Bleeker, 1852)

Synonyms
- Capoeta ampalong Bleeker, 1852

= Hampala ampalong =

Species of fish

Hampala ampalong is a species of freshwater ray-finned fish belonging to the family Cyprinidae, the family which includes the carps, barbs and related fishes. This species is found in Sumatra and western Borneo, and has a maximum total length of 15.5 centimetres (6.1 in).
