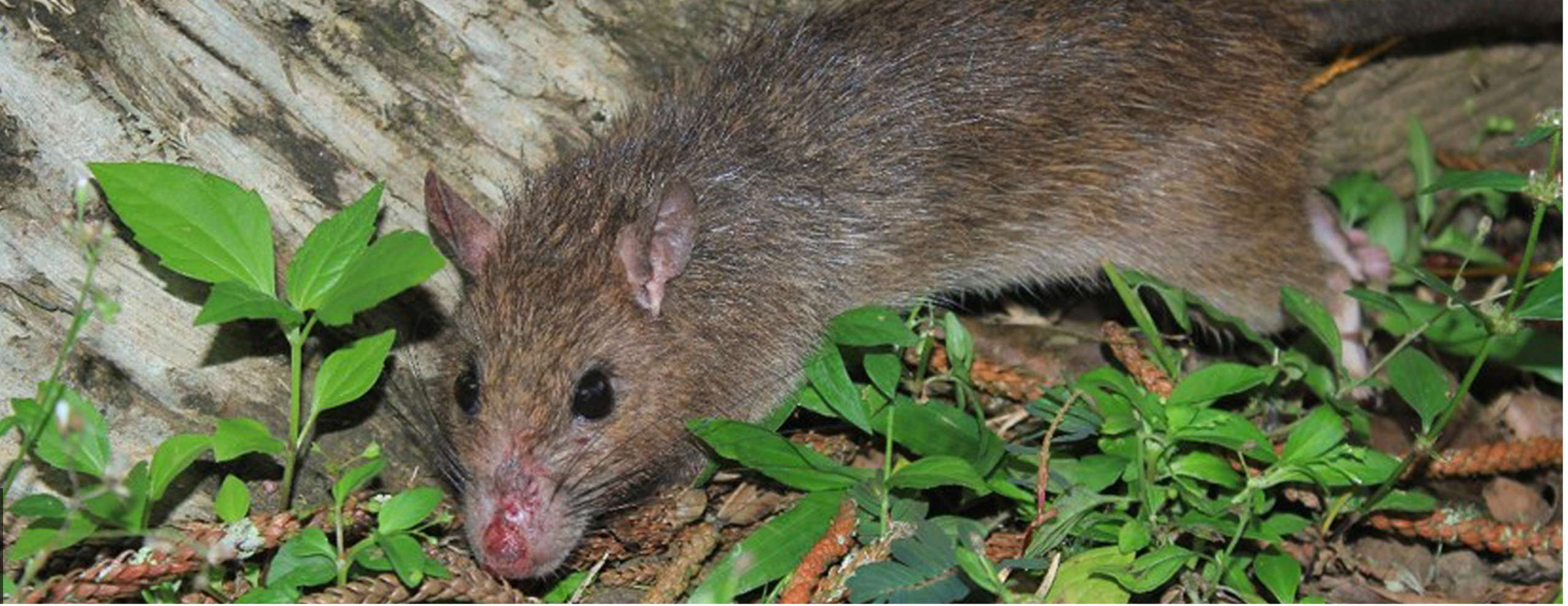

Conservation status
- Least Concern (IUCN 3.1)

Scientific classification
- Kingdom: Animalia
- Phylum: Chordata
- Class: Mammalia
- Order: Rodentia
- Family: Muridae
- Genus: Rattus
- Species: R. everetti

Binomial name
- Rattus everetti (Günther, 1879)
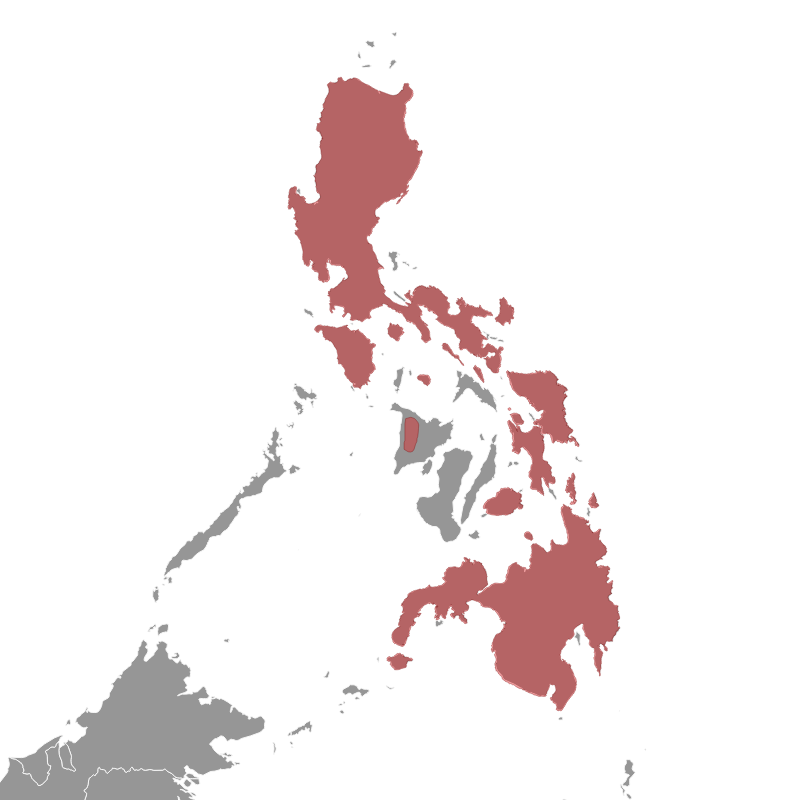

= Philippine forest rat =

Species of rodent

The Philippine forest rat (Rattus everetti) is a species of rodent in the family Muridae. It is found only in the Philippines, and is located throughout the archipelago. The scientific name commemorates British colonial administrator and zoological collector Alfred Hart Everett. R. everetti is widespread throughout its range and feeds on a diet of fruit, seeds, worms and insects. There are no major threats to the species, which has been found to be competitively superior to introduced Rattus species in disturbed and undisturbed forest habitat.
