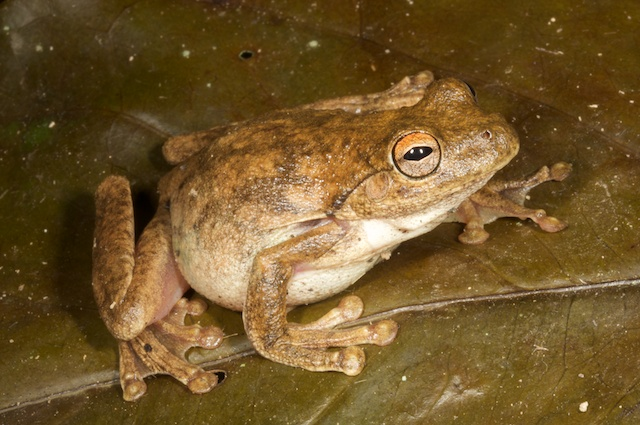

Conservation status
- Data Deficient (IUCN 3.1)

Scientific classification
- Kingdom: Animalia
- Phylum: Chordata
- Class: Amphibia
- Order: Anura
- Family: Pelodryadidae
- Genus: Pengilleyia
- Species: P. everetti

Binomial name
- Pengilleyia everetti (Boulenger, 1897)

Synonyms
- Litoria everetti (Boulenger, 1897)

= Everett's tree frog =

Species of amphibian

Everett's tree frog or the Timor tree frog (Pengilleyia everetti) is a species of frog in the subfamily Pelodryadinae. The scientific name commemorates the British colonial administrator and zoological collector Alfred Hart Everett. It is found in Indonesia and Timor-Leste.

== Distribution and habitat ==
It is found on the Indonesian islands of on Alor, Sumba, Sawu, and in both Indonesian West Timor and independent Timor-Leste. Its natural habitats are subtropical or tropical dry forests, subtropical or tropical dry shrubland, rivers, intermittent rivers, freshwater marshes, and intermittent freshwater marshes.
