= Hampala dispar =

Conservation status
- Least Concern (IUCN 3.1)

Scientific classification
- Kingdom: Animalia
- Phylum: Chordata
- Class: Actinopterygii
- Order: Cypriniformes
- Family: Cyprinidae
- Genus: Hampala
- Species: H. dispar

Binomial name
- Hampala dispar Smith, 1934

Species of fish

Hampala dispar, also known as the eye-spot barb or the spotted hampala barb, is a southeast Asian species of cyprinid, endemic to the basin of the Mekong. It is found in Thailand, Laos, Cambodia and Sông bé Việt Nam

== Anatomy and appearance ==
Hampala dispar has a slender and flat-sided appearance. It has a very big mouth with a pair of antennae beside them. Its most iconic feature is its black dot on each side of its body. Individuals may reach a length of 35 cm.

Hampala dispar is a predatory fish. It consumes fish and other smaller aquatic animals for food. It is consumed by fresh cooking, fermenting, and popularly raised as ornamental fish.
