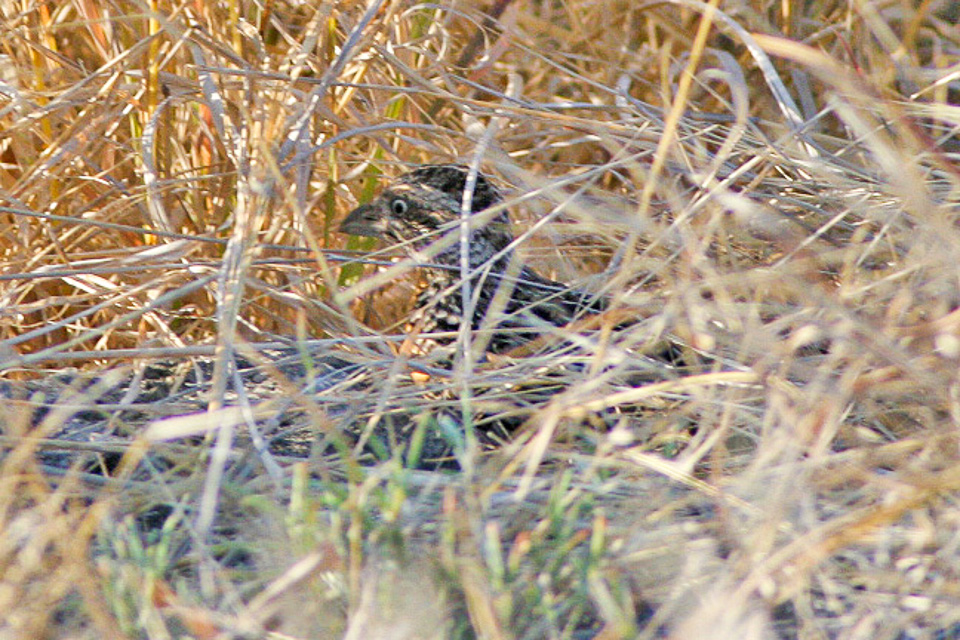

Conservation status
- Least Concern (IUCN 3.1)

Scientific classification
- Kingdom: Animalia
- Phylum: Chordata
- Class: Aves
- Order: Charadriiformes
- Family: Turnicidae
- Genus: Turnix
- Species: T. everetti

Binomial name
- Turnix everetti Hartert, 1898

= Sumba buttonquail =

Species of bird

The Sumba buttonquail (Turnix everetti) is a species of bird in the family Turnicidae. The scientific name commemorates British colonial administrator and zoological collector Alfred Hart Everett.

== Distribution and habitat ==
It is endemic to Sumba Island in the Lesser Sundas of Indonesia. Its natural habitats are dry savanna, subtropical or tropical moist shrubland, subtropical or tropical dry lowland grassland, and arable land. It is threatened by habitat loss.
