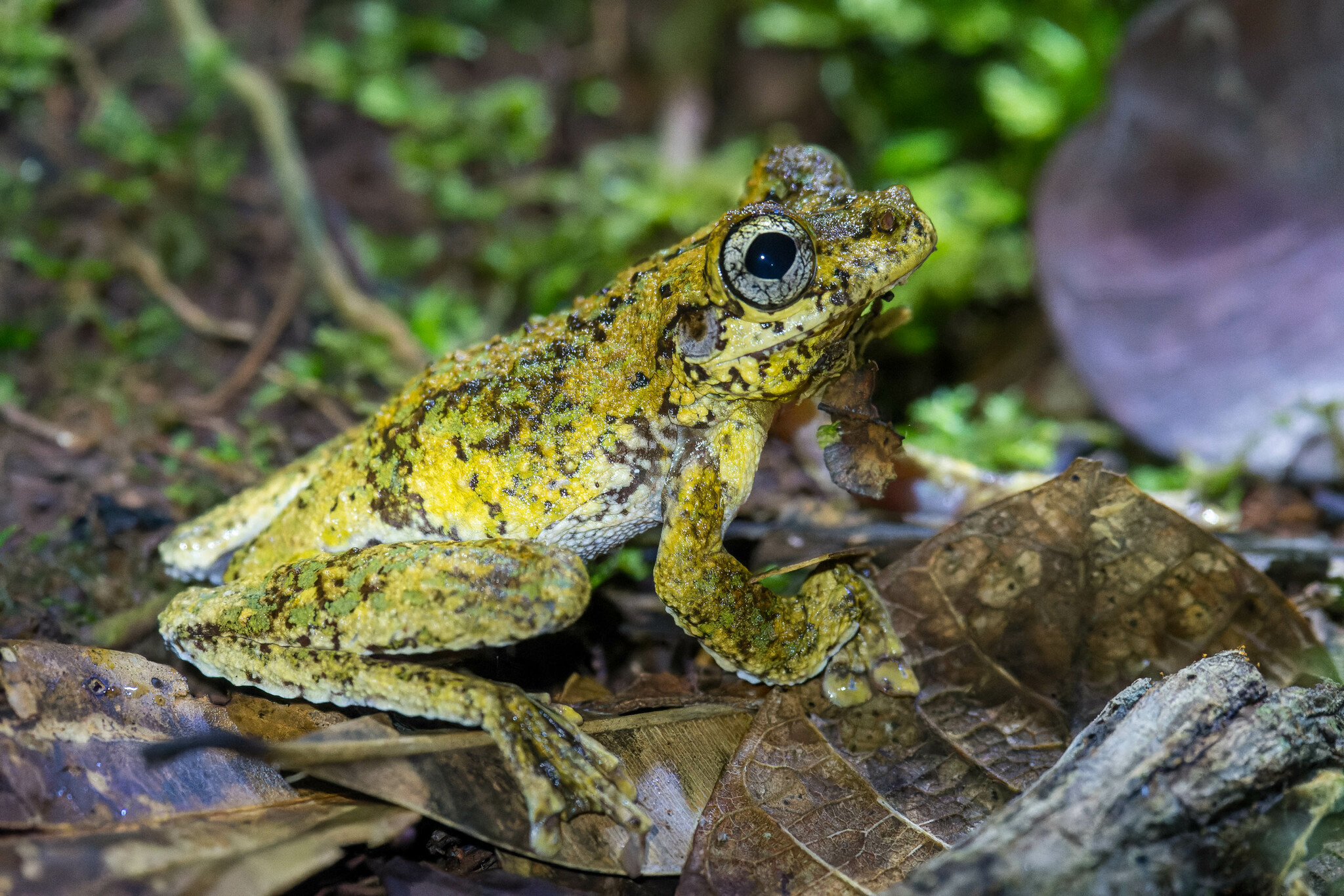

Conservation status
- Least Concern (IUCN 3.1)

Scientific classification
- Kingdom: Animalia
- Phylum: Chordata
- Class: Amphibia
- Order: Anura
- Family: Pelodryadidae
- Genus: Pengilleyia
- Species: P. amboinensis

Binomial name
- Pengilleyia amboinensis (Horst, 1883)

Synonyms
- Hyla amboinensis Horst, 1883; Hyla papuensis Werner, 1901; Hyla kampeni Barbour, 1908; Nyctimystes amboinensis (Horst, 1883); Hyla amboinensis Horst, 1883; Litoria amboinensis (Horst, 1883)

= Horst's tree frog =

Species of amphibian

Horst's tree frog (Pengilleyia amboinensis) is a species of frog in the family Pelodryadidae found in New Guinea. Its natural habitats are subtropical or tropical moist lowland forests, subtropical or tropical swamps, swamps, freshwater marshes, intermittent freshwater marshes, rural gardens, and heavily degraded former forests.
