= Darlington's Madang tree frog =

Conservation status
- Least Concern (IUCN 3.1)

Scientific classification
- Kingdom: Animalia
- Phylum: Chordata
- Class: Amphibia
- Order: Anura
- Family: Pelodryadidae
- Genus: Pengilleyia
- Species: P. darlingtoni

Binomial name
- Pengilleyia darlingtoni (Loveridge, 1945)

Synonyms
- Litoria darlingtoni (Loveridge, 1945)

Species of amphibian

Darlington's Madang tree frog (Pengilleyia darlingtoni) is a species of frog in the subfamily Pelodryadinae. It is endemic to Papua New Guinea. Its natural habitats are subtropical or tropical high-altitude shrubland, intermittent freshwater marshes, heavily degraded former forest, water storage areas, and aquaculture ponds.
