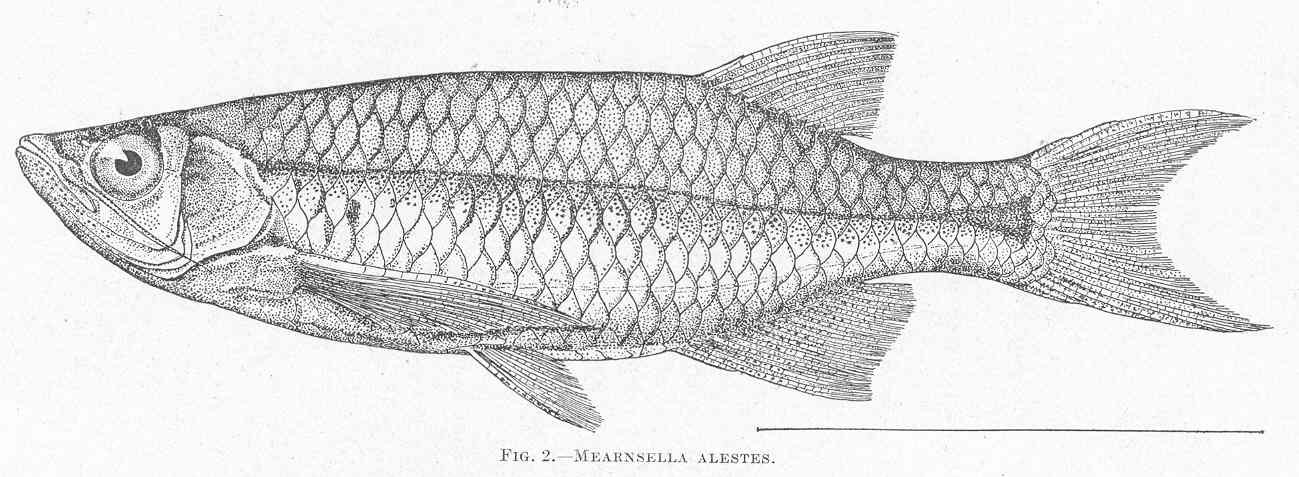
- Nematabramis alestes

Scientific classification
- Kingdom: Animalia
- Phylum: Chordata
- Class: Actinopterygii
- Order: Cypriniformes
- Family: Danionidae
- Subfamily: Chedrinae
- Genus: Nematabramis; Boulenger, 1894

Type species
- Nematabramis everetti Boulenger, 1894

Synonyms
- Mearnsella Seale & B. A. Bean, 1907

= Nematabramis =

Genus of fishes

Nematabramis is a genus of freshwater ray-finned fish belonging to the family Danionidae, the danionins or danios. These fishes occur in Borneo and the Philippines.

== Species ==
Nemtabramis contains the following species:

- Nematabramis alestes (Seale & B. A. Bean, 1907)
- Nematabramis borneensis Inger & P. K. Chin, 1962
- Nematabramis everetti Boulenger, 1894
- Nematabramis steindachnerii Popta, 1905
