= Sphenomorphus alfredi =

Conservation status
- Data Deficient (IUCN 3.1)

Scientific classification
- Kingdom: Animalia
- Phylum: Chordata
- Class: Reptilia
- Order: Squamata
- Family: Scincidae
- Genus: Sphenomorphus
- Species: S. alfredi

Binomial name
- Sphenomorphus alfredi (Boulenger, 1898)

Synonyms
- Lygosoma alfredi Boulenger, 1898; Sphenomorphus alfredi — Mittleman, 1952

Species of lizard

Sphenomorphus alfredi is a species of skink, a lizard in the family Scincidae. The species is endemic to Malaysia near Mount Kinabalu, Sabah, and Borneo.

== Etymology ==
The specific name, alfredi, is in honour of British naturalist Alfred Hart Everett.

== Habitat ==
The preferred natural habitat of S. alfredi is forest, generally in low hills.

== Reproduction ==
The mode of reproduction of S. alfredi is unknown.
