= Hampala salweenensis =

Conservation status
- Data Deficient (IUCN 3.1)

Scientific classification
- Kingdom: Animalia
- Phylum: Chordata
- Class: Actinopterygii
- Order: Cypriniformes
- Family: Cyprinidae
- Genus: Hampala
- Species: H. salweenensis

Binomial name
- Hampala salweenensis A. Doi & Y. Taki, 1994

Species of fish

Hampala salweenensis is a southeast Asian species of cyprinid, endemic to the basin of the Salween in Thailand and Myanmar. It reaches a length of 30 cm.
