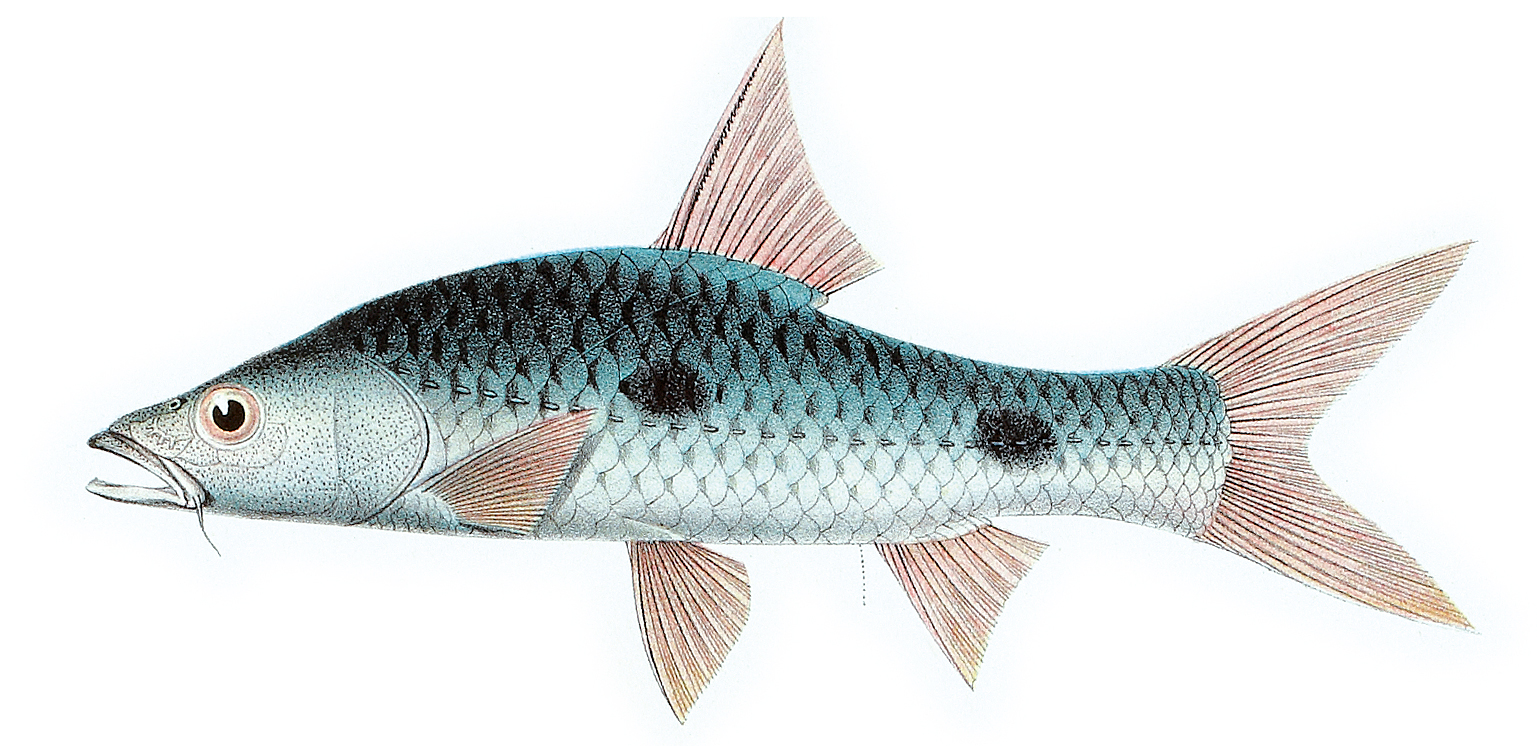
- Hampala ampalong

Scientific classification
- Kingdom: Animalia
- Phylum: Chordata
- Class: Actinopterygii
- Order: Cypriniformes
- Family: Cyprinidae
- Subfamily: Smiliogastrinae
- Genus: Hampala; Kuhl & van Hasselt in van Hasselt, 1823

Type species
- Hampala macrolepidota Kuhl & van Hasselt, 1823

Species
- See text

Synonyms
- Heteroleuciscus Sauvage, 1874

= Hampala =

Genus of fishes

Hampala is a genus of freshwater ray-finned fish belonging to the family Cyprinidae, the family which includes the carps, barbs and related fishes. The species in this genus are found in South-East Asia.

== Species ==
Hampala contains the following species:

- Hampala ampalong (Bleeker 1852)
- Hampala bimaculata (Popta 1905)
- Hampala dispar Smith, 1934
- Hampala katibas Tan & Grinang, 2025
- Hampala lopezi Herre, 1924
- Hampala lupar Tan & Grinang, 2025
- Hampala macrolepidota Kuhl & van Hasselt, 1823 (Hampala barb)
- Hampala sabana Inger & P. K. Chin, 1962
- Hampala salweenensis A. Doi & Y. Taki, 1994
- Hampala siamensis Panitvong & Tan, 2025
