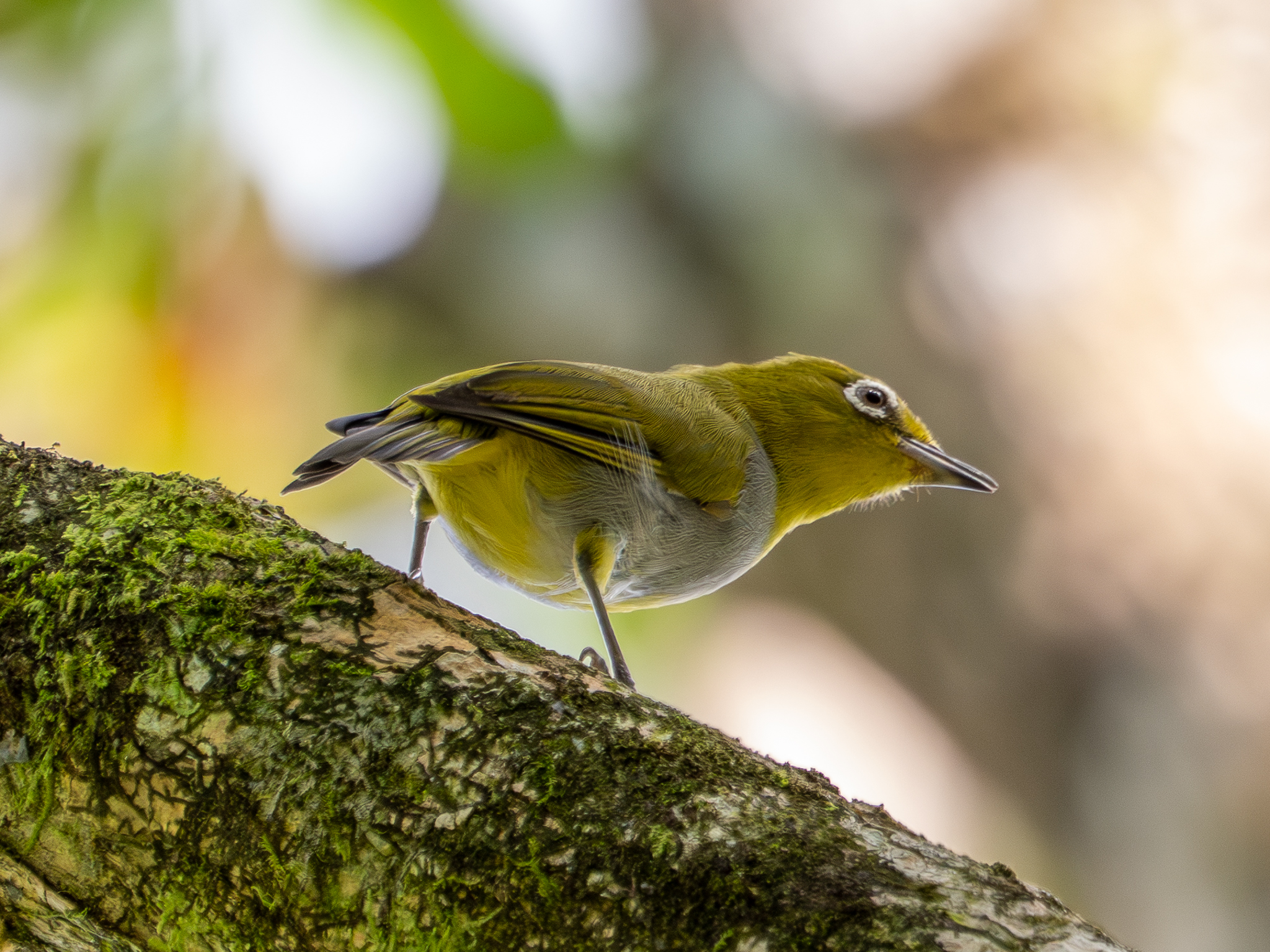
- ssp. basilanicus

Conservation status
- Least Concern (IUCN 3.1)

Scientific classification
- Kingdom: Animalia
- Phylum: Chordata
- Class: Aves
- Order: Passeriformes
- Family: Zosteropidae
- Genus: Zosterops
- Species: Z. everetti

Binomial name
- Zosterops everetti Tweeddale, 1878

= Everett's white-eye =

Species of bird

Everett's white-eye (Zosterops everetti) is a bird species in the disputed family Zosteropidae, which might belong with the Old World babblers (Timaliidae). The name commemorates British colonial administrator and zoological collector Alfred Hart Everett. It is only found on the Talaud Islands, Sulu Archipelago and the Philippines. Its natural habitats are tropical moist lowland forests and tropical moist montane forests.

== Description and taxonomy ==
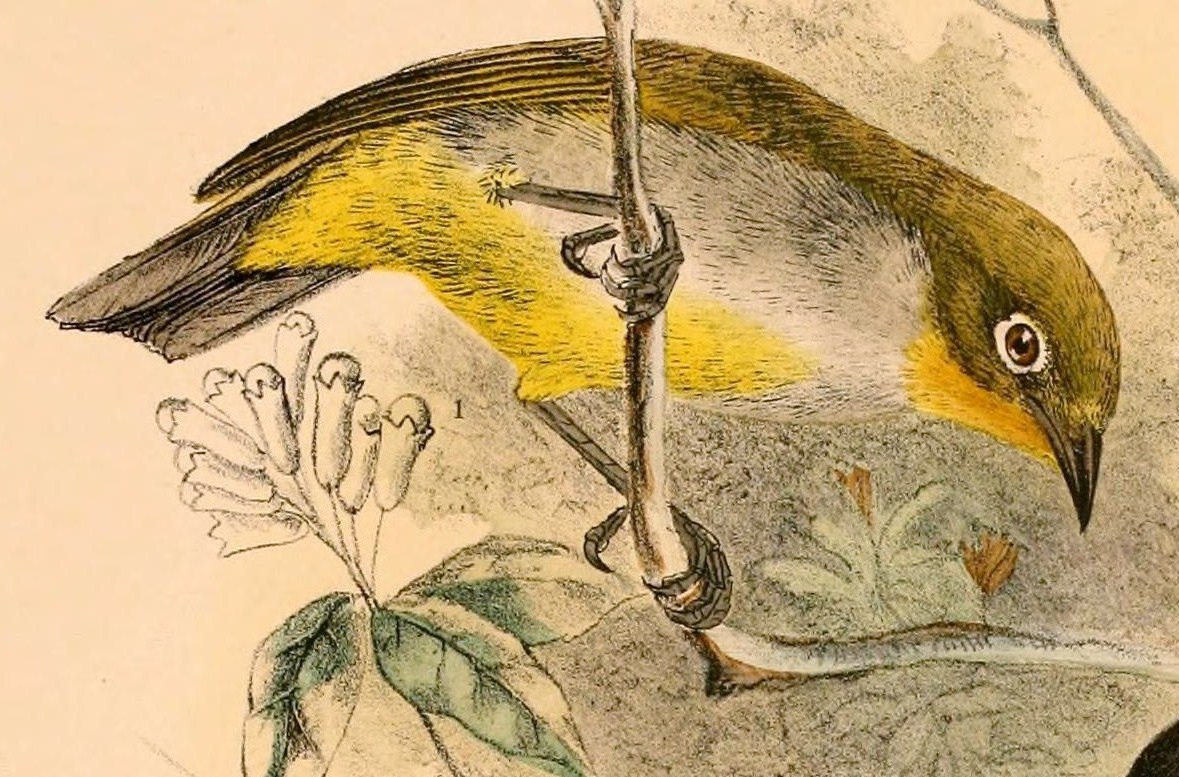
Illustration in Meyer & Wiglesworth (1898)

=== Subspecies ===
Six subspecies are recognized:

- Z. e. boholensis McGregor, RC, 1908 – Philippines (Bohol, Leyte, Samar, Calicoan, and Biliran)
- Z. e. everetti Tweeddale, A, 1878 – Philippines (Cebu)
- Z. e. basilanicus Steere, JB, 1890 – Philippines (Basilan, Dinagat Islands, Mindanao, Siargao, and Camiguin)
- Z. e. siquijorensis Bourns, FS & Worcester, DC, 1894 – Philippines (Siquijor)
- Z. e. mandibularis Stresemann, EFT, 1931 – Sulu Archipelago (Sulu, Tawitawi, Jolo, Bongao, and Sanga-Sanga)
- Z. e. babelo Meyer, AB & Wiglesworth, LW, 1895 – Talaud Islands (Karakelang and Salebabu) and northern Sulawesi

== Ecology and behavior ==
Likely a generalist that feeds on fruit, berries, small insects and nectar. Forages in the understory and often joins mixed-species flocks with other small birds. Breeding season believed to be April to August. Nest is a typical white-eye nest, a few meters above on a small tree. Clutch size 3-4.

== Habitat and conservation status ==
This bird's habitat is primary and secondary forest and scrubland up to 1,000 meters above sea level.

IUCN has assessed this bird as least-concern species as it has a wide range and is fairly adapatable to degraded habitats. However, the population is still believed to be declining due to deforestation in the Philippines continues throughout the country due to slash and burn farming, mining, illegal logging and habitat conversion.
