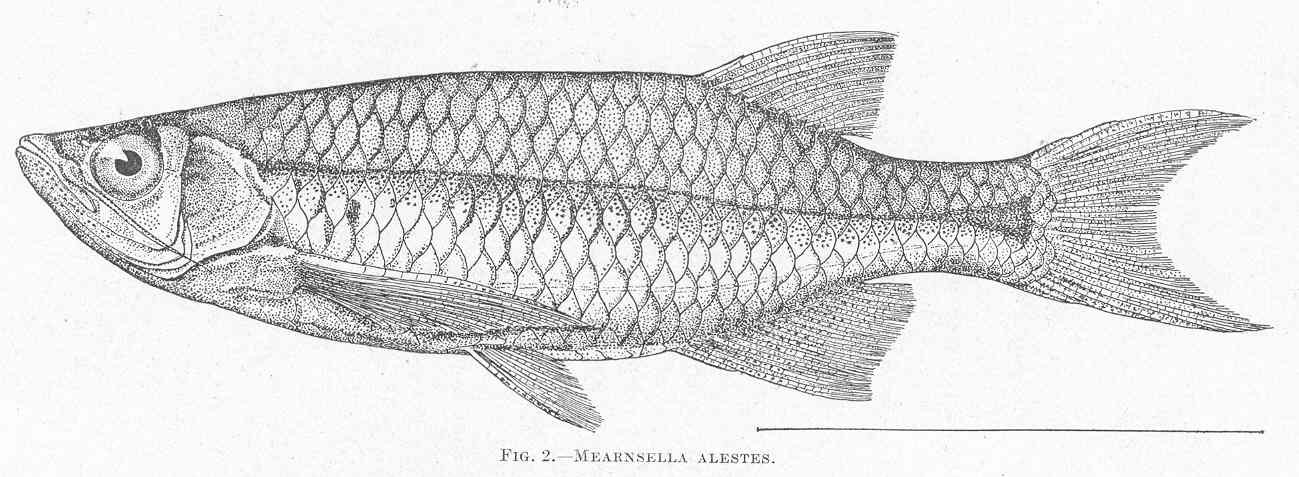

Conservation status
- Least Concern (IUCN 3.1)

Scientific classification
- Kingdom: Animalia
- Phylum: Chordata
- Class: Actinopterygii
- Order: Cypriniformes
- Family: Danionidae
- Subfamily: Chedrinae
- Genus: Nematabramis
- Species: N. alestes

Binomial name
- Nematabramis alestes (Seale & Bean, 1907)

Synonyms
- Mearnsella alestes Seale & Bean, 1907; Nematabramis verecundus Herre, 1924

= Nematabramis alestes =

Species of fish

Nematabramis alestes is a species of freshwater ray-finned fish belonging to the family Danionidae, the danionins or danios. This fish found in the Zamboanga Peninsula, Basilan, Palawan, and Busuanga Island of the Philippines. It belongs to the genus Nematabramis. It reaches up to 10.1 cm (4.0 in) in length.
