= Hampala bimaculata =

Conservation status
- Least Concern (IUCN 3.1)

Scientific classification
- Kingdom: Animalia
- Phylum: Chordata
- Class: Actinopterygii
- Order: Cypriniformes
- Family: Cyprinidae
- Genus: Hampala
- Species: H. bimaculata

Binomial name
- Hampala bimaculata (Popta, 1905)

Synonyms
- Barbus hampal var bimaculata Popta, 1905

Species of fish

Hampala bimaculata is a species of freshwater ray-finned fish belonging to the family Cyprinidae, the family which includes the carps, barbs and related fishes. This species is found in Borneo and has a maximum total length of 50 centimetres (20 in).
