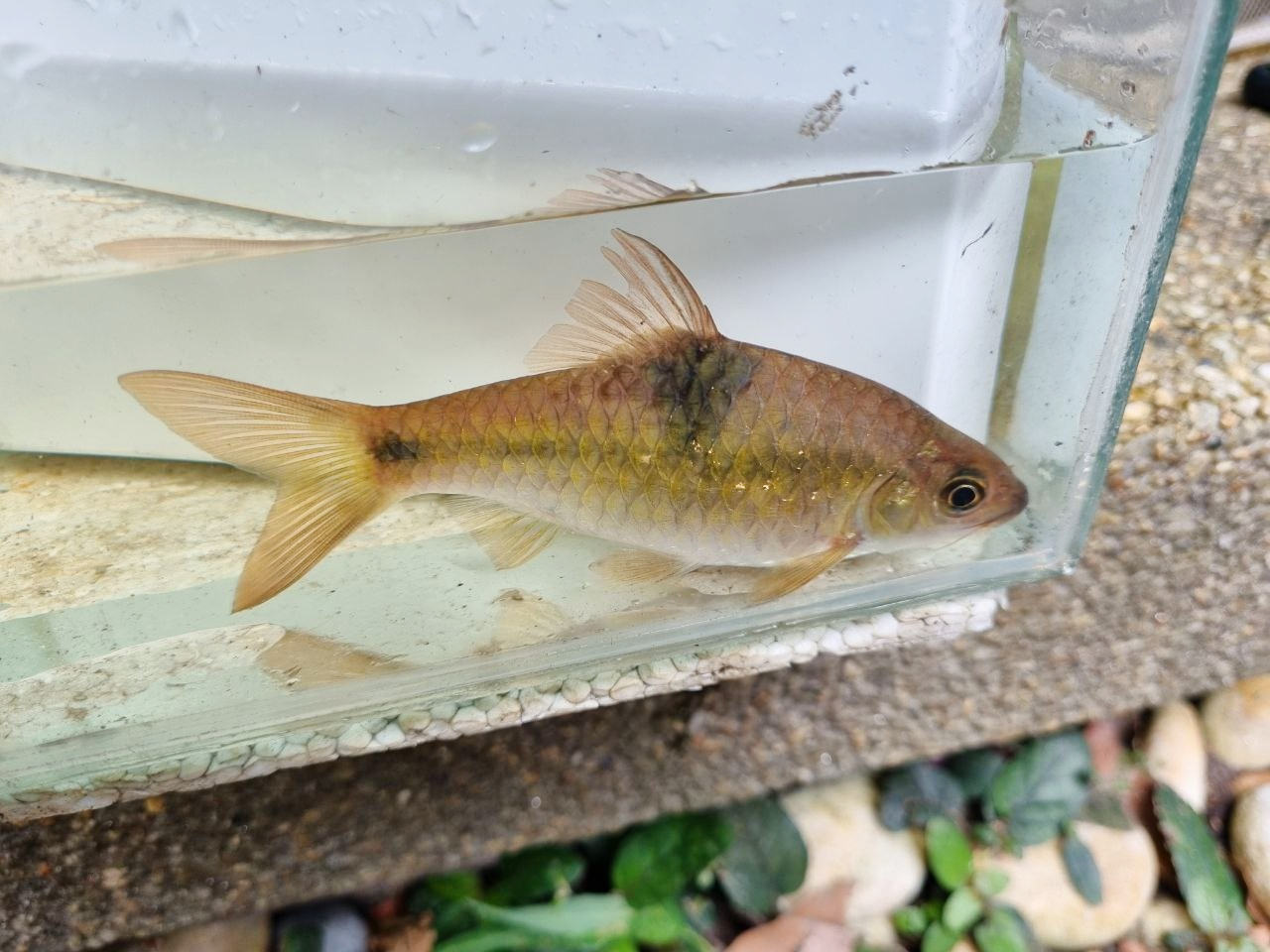

Scientific classification
- Kingdom: Animalia
- Phylum: Chordata
- Class: Actinopterygii
- Division: Teleostei
- Order: Cypriniformes
- Family: Cyprinidae
- Genus: Barbodes
- Species: B. sellifer

Binomial name
- Barbodes sellifer Kottelat & Lim 2021

= Barbodes sellifer =

Saddled barb

Species of fish

Barbodes sellifer, the saddled barb, is a species of cyprinid fish described in 2021. This species has not been reported sold in the aquarium trade, but where the species is present reports of them being kept by aquarists are abundant.

Previously thought to be a variant of Barbodes banksi, it and B. zakariaismaili were recently removed from B. banksi due to its unique color pattern and morphological differences that set it apart from other species of its genus.

== Etymology ==
Sellifer is a Latin adjective meaning 'bearing a saddle'.

== Description ==
Similar to other of its genus, the overall body coloration is dark yellowish brown, while the back of the fish is darker, and its underside paler. The feature that distinguishes the species is the 'saddle' on its back, a rectangular or triangular black blotch under the dorsal fin that occupies 4–6 scales and stretches down to the fourth lateral scale line. This black pattern can appear pale or darker depending on the environment.

== Distribution ==
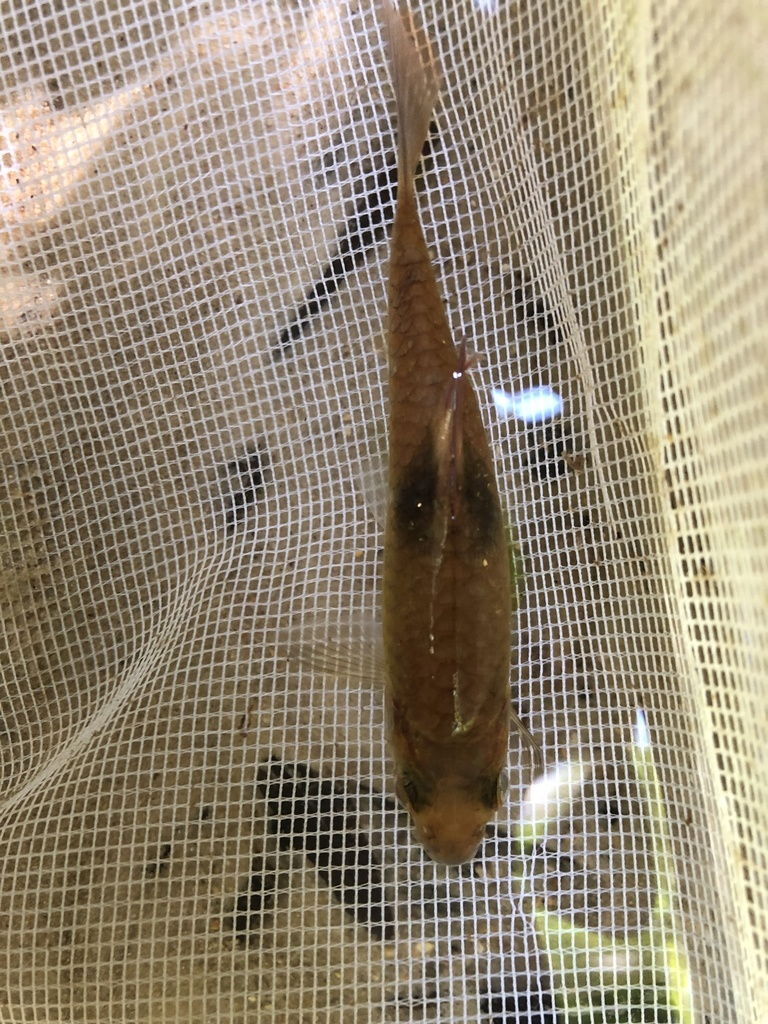
Top view of wild specimen from Selangor, Malaysia. Featuring its 'saddle'

It is found in Singapore, the Malay Peninsula, Indonesia, and parts of Sumatra. However, the population at Bangka Island is small, and there is an effort to breed them in captivity to increase the island population.

== Habitat ==
It prefers clear forest streams and pools, but is quite adaptable to other habitats like large rivers, lakes, and even swamps.

This species can sometimes be spotted intermingling with Barbodes lateristriga (spanner barb), Barbodes dunckeri (clown barb) and Rasbora elegans (two-spot rasbora).
