= Alfred Hart Everett =

British civil servant and naturalist (1848–1898)

Alfred Hart Everett (11 October 1848 – 18 June 1898) was a British civil servant and administrator in Borneo as well as being a naturalist and natural history collector.

== Career ==
Everett was born on Norfolk Island to British parents: George, the doctor at the penal colony, from Wiltshire, and Anna-Maria, from Jersey. They left in 1851 to return to England via Tasmania, so he was educated in England, including some time at the Royal School of Mines under Thomas Henry Huxley. In 1869 he went to Sarawak in north-western Borneo in order to collect natural history specimens. After two years there, he entered the service of the Kingdom of Sarawak, as a Resident in the Baram district, under the White Rajahs. In 1878 and 1879, he was engaged by the Royal Society and British Association to explore 'the Caves of Borneo' in search of the remains of ancient man. The explorations were made around Bau and Niah but were unsuccessful in their primary aim (although the orangutan jaw which later formed part of Piltdown Man may well have been one result). In 1885, he was appointed the Rajah’s Consul to the Court of the Sultan of Brunei. He later served in North Borneo in the administration of the British North Borneo Company.

The British Museum has a large collection of pottery donated to the museum in 1885 by Augustus Wollaston Franks mostly collected in 'Borneo' by A.H.Everett.

In 1891, Everett became a member of the British Ornithologists' Union. He never married. He died in London.

== Zoological collecting ==
Everett collected for the Marquess of Tweedale and Walter Rothschild, as well as others. He is best known for the collections he made of birds and mammals in Borneo and the Philippines.

== Legacy ==
Everett is commemorated in the names of several animals, including:

Birds

- Bornean spiderhunter (Arachnothera everetti)
- Brown-backed flowerpecker (Dicaeum everetti)
- Chestnut-crested yuhina (Staphida everetti)
- Everett's thrush (Zoothera everetti)
- Everett's white-eye (Zosterops everetti)
- Russet-capped tesia (Tesia everetti)
- Sumba buttonquail (Turnix everetti)
- Sumba hornbill (Rhyticeros everetti)
- Tanahjampea monarch (Monarcha everetti)
- Yellowish bulbul (Ixos everetti)

Mammals

- Bornean ferret-badger (Melogale everetti)
- Bornean mountain ground squirrel (Dremomys everetti)
- Mindanao treeshrew (Tupaia everetti)
- Philippine forest rat (Rattus everetti)

Snakes

- Everett's reedsnake (Calamaria everetti)
- Jewelled kukri snake (Oligodon everetti)
- Sabah striped coralsnake (Calliophis intestinalis everetti)

Lizards

- Sphenomorphus alfredi

Frogs

- Everett's treefrog (Litoria everetti)

Fish

- Clown barb (Puntius everetti)
- Nematabramis everetti Boulenger, 1894

Stick Insect (Phasmida)

- Lonchodes everetti (Kirby, 1896)

Cockroach (Blattodea)

- Rhabdoblatta everetti (Hanitsch, 1931)

Praying mantis (Mantodea)

- Hierodula everetti Kirby, 1903

Land snails (Dyakiidae)

- Everettia Godwin-Austen, 1891
