= Nematabramis steindachnerii =

Conservation status
- Least Concern (IUCN 3.1)

Scientific classification
- Kingdom: Animalia
- Phylum: Chordata
- Class: Actinopterygii
- Order: Cypriniformes
- Family: Danionidae
- Subfamily: Chedrinae
- Genus: Nematabramis
- Species: N. steindachnerii

Binomial name
- Nematabramis steindachnerii Popta, 1905

Species of fish

Nematabramis steindachnerii is a species of freshwater ray-finned fish belonging to the family Danionidae, the danionins or danios. This species is endemic to Borneo. It belongs to the genus Nematabramis. It reaches up to 11.2 cm (4.4 in) in length.

== Etymology ==
The fish is named in honor of Austrian ichthyologist Franz Steindachner (1834–1919).
