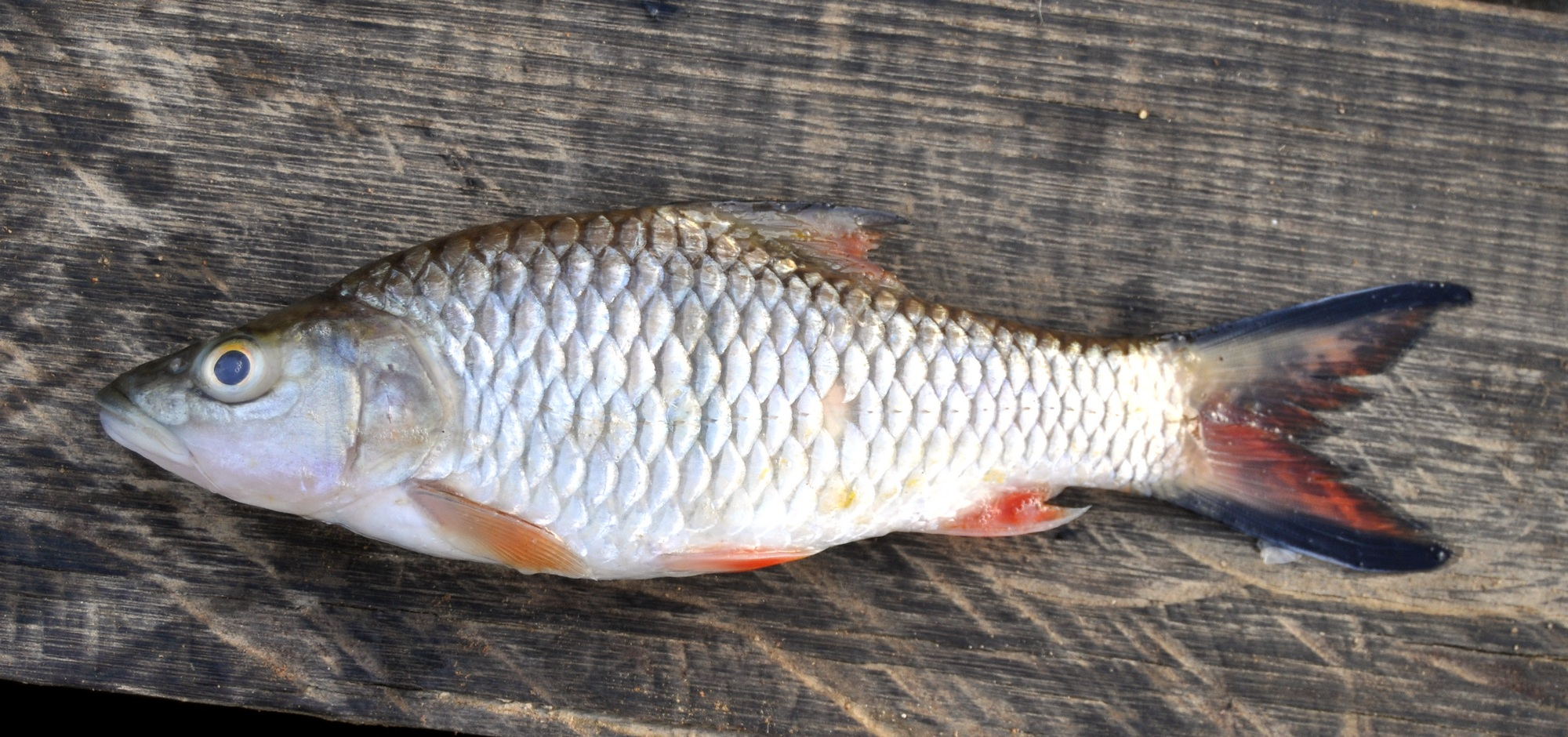

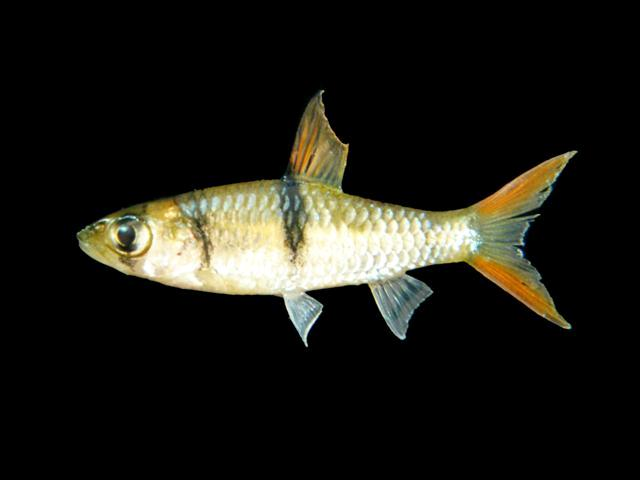
- Immature (18 cm or 7 in long) above, juvenile (3.5 cm or 1.5 in long) below

Conservation status
- Least Concern (IUCN 3.1)

Scientific classification
- Kingdom: Animalia
- Phylum: Chordata
- Class: Actinopterygii
- Order: Cypriniformes
- Family: Cyprinidae
- Genus: Hampala
- Species: H. macrolepidota

Binomial name
- Hampala macrolepidota Kuhl & van Hasselt, 1823

Synonyms
- Capoeta macrolepidota Valenciennes, 1842; Barbus macrolepidotus (Valenciennes, 1842); Hampala macrolepidota (Valenciennes, 1842); Barbus hampal Günther, 1868; Heteroleuciscus jullieni Sauvage, 1874

= Hampala macrolepidota =

Species of fish

Hampala macrolepidota, the hampala barb, is a relatively large southeast Asian species of cyprinid from the Mekong and Chao Phraya basins, as well as Peninsular Malaysia and the Greater Sundas (Borneo, Java and Sumatra). It prefers running rivers and streams, but can be seen in most freshwater habitats except torrents, small creeks and shallow swamps. This predatory species reaches up to 70 cm (2.3 ft) in length and it is common at half that size.

== As food ==
This fish is one of the fish species that has been used as food in Southeast Asia since ancient times.

Although it is an important food fish, it remains abundant in at least parts of its range, resulting in a Least Concern rating by the IUCN.
