= Nematabramis everetti =

Conservation status
- Least Concern (IUCN 3.1)

Scientific classification
- Kingdom: Animalia
- Phylum: Chordata
- Class: Actinopterygii
- Order: Cypriniformes
- Family: Danionidae
- Subfamily: Chedrinae
- Genus: Nematabramis
- Species: N. everetti

Binomial name
- Nematabramis everetti Boulenger, 1894

Species of fish

Nematabramis everetti is a species of freshwater ray-finned fish belonging to the family Danionidae, the danionins or danios. This fish is endemic to Sabah. It belongs to the genus Nematabramis. It reaches up to 10.5 cm (4.1 in) in length.

== Etymology ==
The fish is named in honor of Alfred Hart Everett (1848–1898), a naturalist, a British civil servant and an administrator in Borneo, who collected the holotype specimen.
