= Barbodes banksi =

Scientific classification
- Kingdom: Animalia
- Phylum: Chordata
- Class: Actinopterygii
- Order: Cypriniformes
- Family: Cyprinidae
- Genus: Barbodes
- Species: B. banksi

Binomial name
- Barbodes banksi (Herre, 1940)

Synonyms
- Puntius binotatus banksi Herre, 1940; Puntius banksi Herre, 1940; Systomus banksi (Herre, 1940)

Species of fish

Barbodes banksi is a species of cyprinid fish native to Malaysia and Indonesia where it can be found in foothill and lowland streams with clear water.
