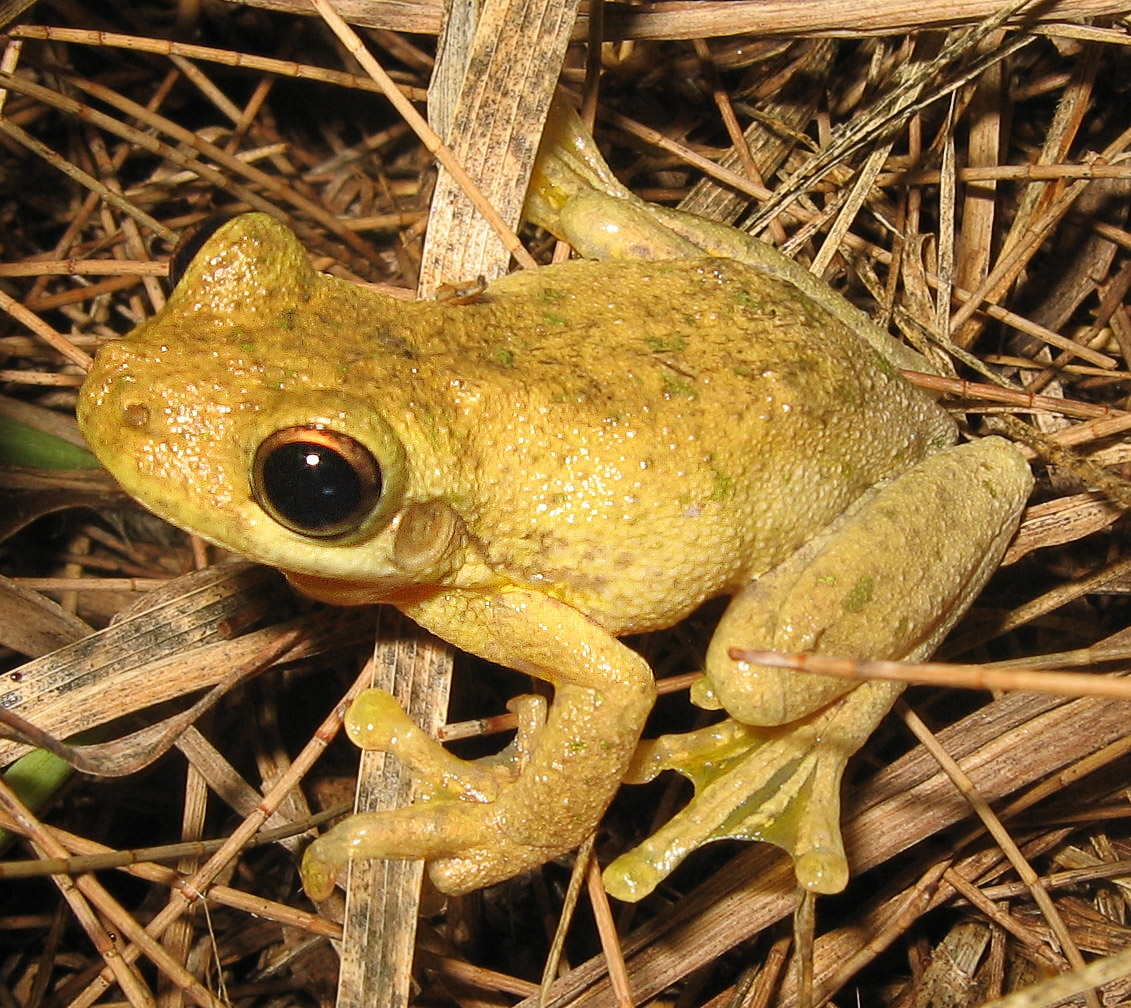

Conservation status
- Least Concern (IUCN 3.1)

Scientific classification
- Kingdom: Animalia
- Phylum: Chordata
- Class: Amphibia
- Order: Anura
- Family: Pelodryadidae
- Genus: Pengilleyia
- Species: P. tyleri

Binomial name
- Pengilleyia tyleri (Martin, Watson, Gartside, Littlejohn, and Loftus-Hills, 1979)
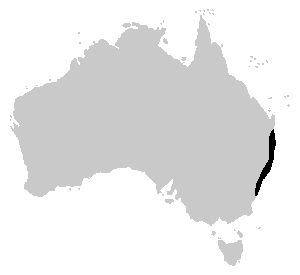
- Distribution of the Tyler's tree frog

Synonyms
- Litoria tyleri Wells and Wellington, 1985

= Tyler's tree frog =

Species of amphibian

Tyler's tree frog or the southern laughing tree frog (Pengilleyia tyleri) is an arboreal species of tree frog. It is native to eastern Australia where it occurs from south-eastern Queensland to the southern coast of New South Wales. It is generally a coastal species and is not found inland.

== Etymology ==
The specific name tyleri honours Michael J. Tyler, an Australian herpetologist.

== Description ==
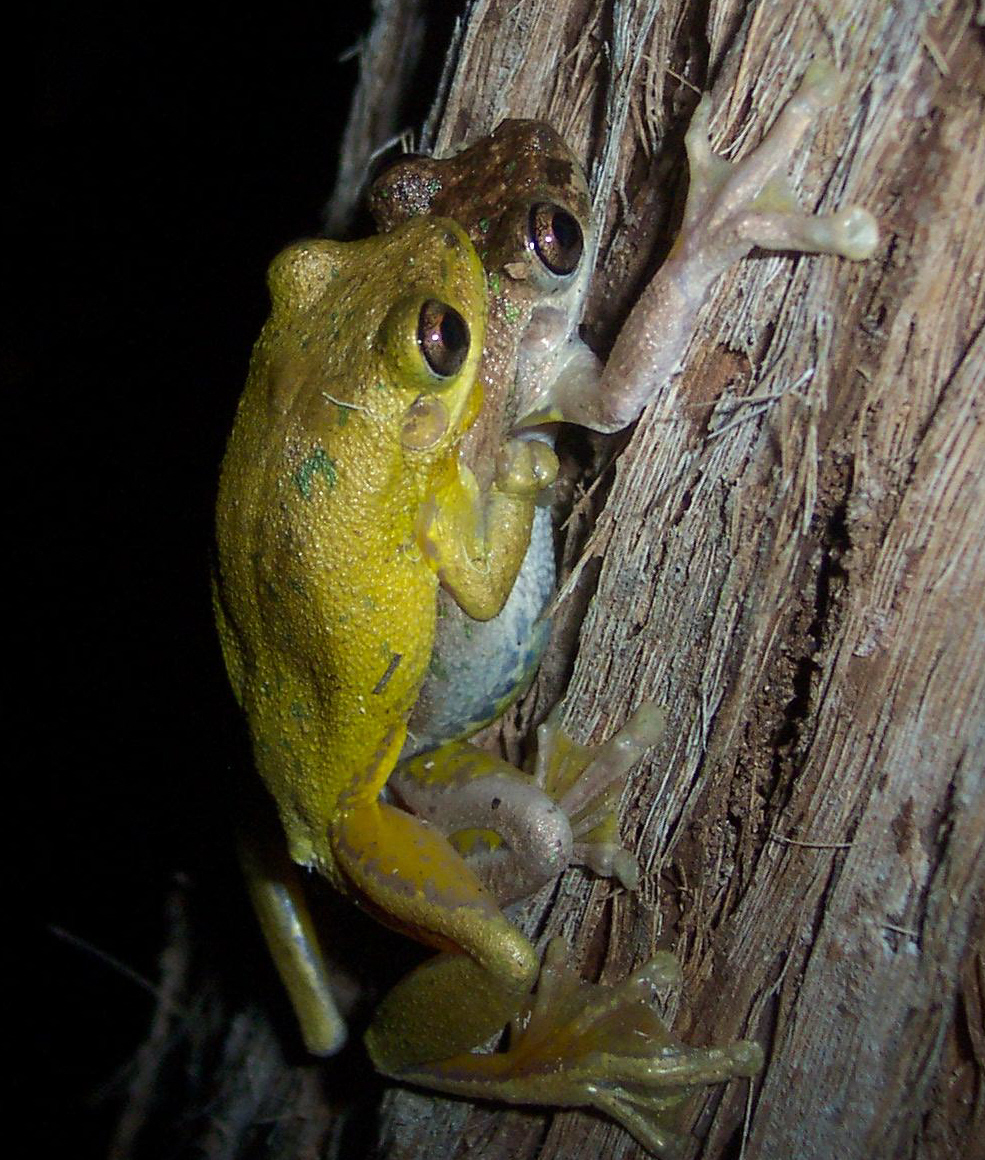
A pair of Tyler's tree frogs in amplexus: the male is in typical breeding yellow colouration.

This frog is grey-brown to fawn (of various shades) on its dorsal surface, and a whitish-yellow on its ventral surface. Females are larger than males and reach a maximum size of about 50 mm. It has green flecks on the back. The iris is golden in colour and it has cross-shaped pupils. This species is very similar to the Peron's tree frog, (Pengilleyia peronii). The easiest way to tell them apart is by call, but P. peronii has strong black and yellow marbling in the thighs, armpits, hands and feet. P. tyleri has only faint yellow and brown marbling in the legs and armpits, lacking marbling in the hands and feet. This species lacks a strong black line above the tympanum, this line is present in P. peronii. As it is an arboreal frog, the toe pads are larger than its toes and fingers, allowing it to grip well on branches. Its hands are partially webbed, its toes are completely webbed, and the tympanum is visible. During breeding, males can turn a very strong yellow colour.

== Ecology and behaviour ==
This species inhabits coastal forest and cleared land. It is normally found around permanent dams, swamps, and ponds. Males call from vegetation around the water body during spring and summer, often after rain. The call of this species resembles a short laughing noise, similar to that of the Peron's tree frog, but without a downward inflection.

== As a pet ==
In Queensland and New South Wales, this animal may be kept in captivity with the appropriate permit.
