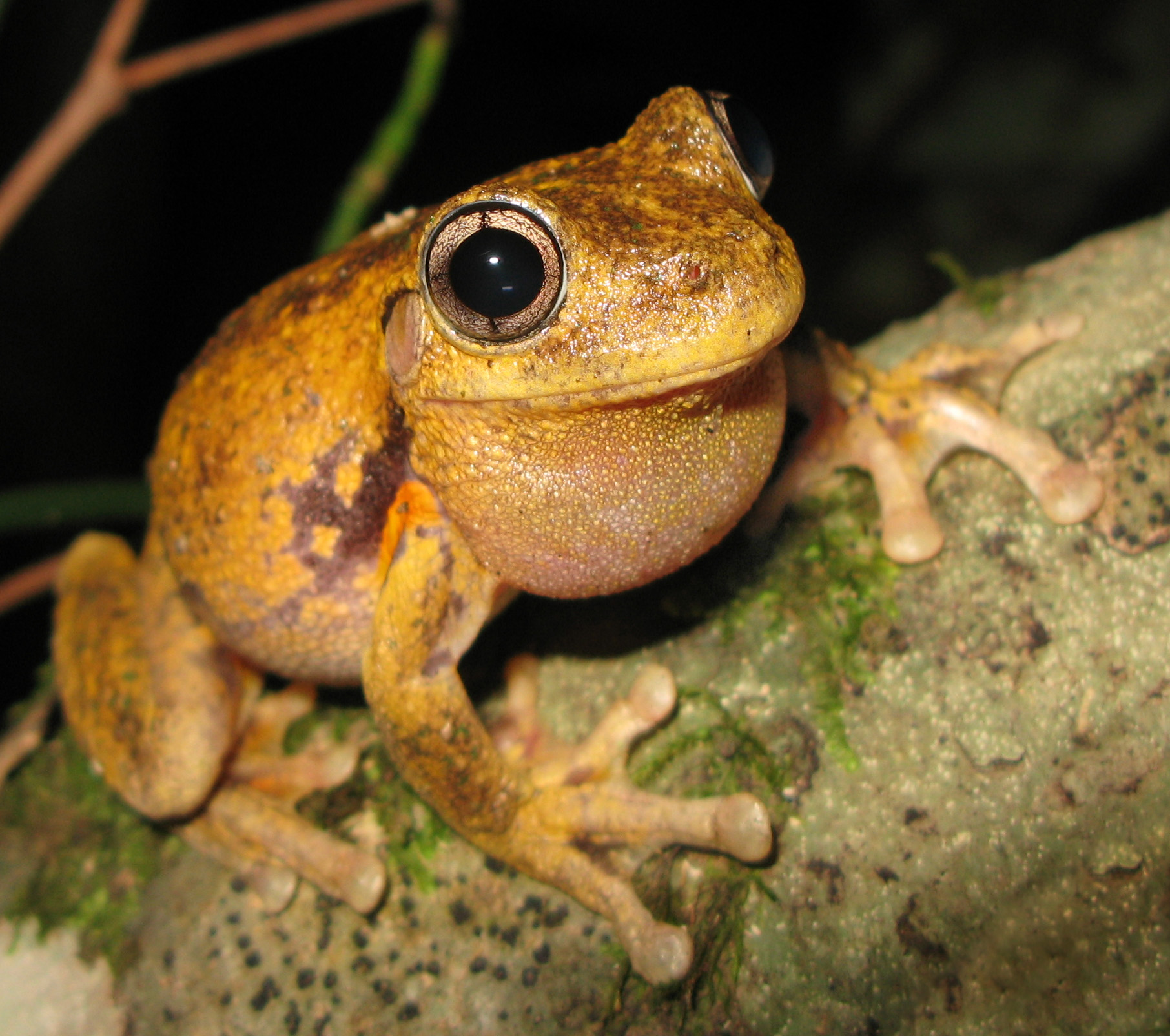
- Male with partially inflated vocal sac

Conservation status
- Least Concern (IUCN 3.1)

Scientific classification
- Kingdom: Animalia
- Phylum: Chordata
- Class: Amphibia
- Order: Anura
- Family: Pelodryadidae
- Genus: Pengilleyia
- Species: P. peronii

Binomial name
- Pengilleyia peronii (Tschudi, 1838)
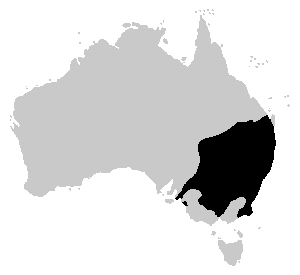
- Peron's tree frog, geographic distribution (in black)

Synonyms
- Litoria peronii Tschudi, 1838

= Peron's tree frog =

Species of amphibian

Peron's tree frog (Pengilleyia peronii), also known as the emerald-spotted tree frog, emerald-speckled tree frog, laughing tree frog, and maniacal cackle frog, is a species of tree frog in the family Pelodryadidae. The species is endemic to Australia, where it is common.

== Etymology ==
The specific name, peronii, is in honour of François Péron, a French naturalist and explorer.

== Description ==
Peron's tree frog is one of the most variably coloured frogs in Australia, with the ability to change colour in less than one hour. Itvaries in shades of grey and brown, with the lightest being almost white. It has mottled yellow and black thighs, armpits, and groin. Occasionally, emerald spots are found on the back, which increase in number with age. A characteristic uncommon in the family Pelodryadidae is pupils which appear cross-shaped. Within the genus Pengilleyia, this characteristic is only shared with Tyler's tree frog (Pengilleyia tyleri). The male Peron's tree frog has a head + body length of about 44–53 mm (1.7–2.1 in), while females are 46–65 mm (1.8–2.6 in).

== Ecology and behaviour ==
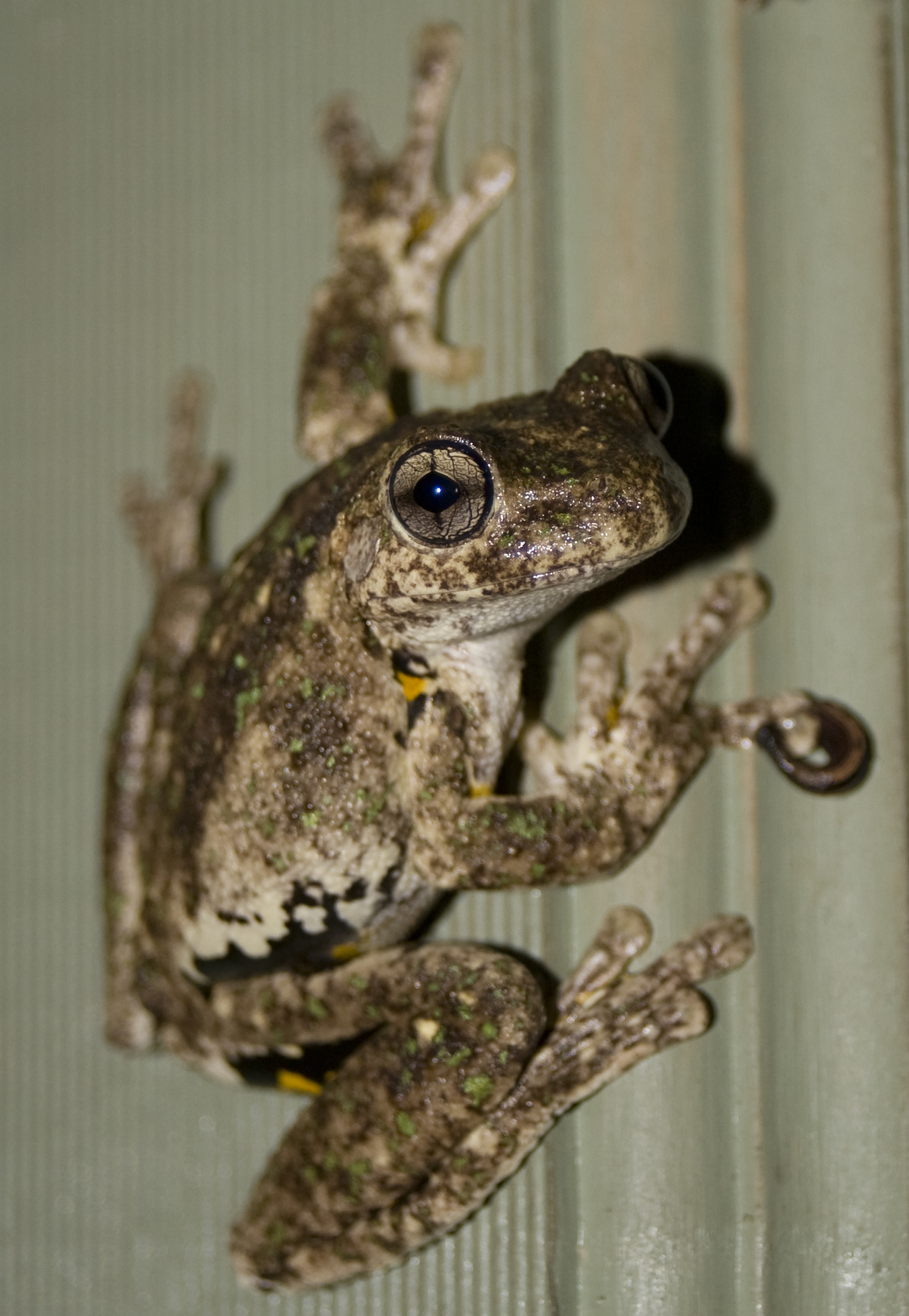
Peron's tree frog with a leech attached to the front foot

The call of Peron's tree frog is a high-pitched cackle, giving it the common names: the "laughing tree frog" and the "maniacal cackle frog". It is found in forests, woodlands, shrublands, and open areas, often far from a water source. It inhabits a variety of niches, predominantly arboreal, such as tree hollows, cracks, and beneath flaking bark. It is commonly found near civilisation (such as suburban Sydney), using ponds as its breeding-water source. It can often be seen on windows or near lights at night, hunting the insects attracted to these light sources. I can often be found at dusk on houseboat windows and beneath street lamps along the Murray River in South Australia.

== As a pet ==
In Australia, Peron's tree frog may be kept in captivity/zoo with the appropriate permit. It prefers living in a place full of climbing materials (stones and sticks), and may remain in water for long periods of time. It doesn't like to be handled for long periods of time.
