= List of recently extinct arthropods =

- Extinct in the wild (EW): 2 species
- Critically endangered (CR): 850 species
- Endangered (EN): 1,531 species
- Vulnerable (VU): 1,574 species
- Near threatened (NT, LR/cd): 1,118 species
- Least concern (LC): 8,632 species
- Data deficient (DD): 4,643 species
Arthropod species (IUCN, 2025-2)
- 18431 extant species have been evaluated
- 13788 of those are fully assessed (Note: excludes data deficient evaluations.)
- 9750 are not threatened at present
- 4223 to 8866 are threatened (Note: Threatened comprises CR, EN and VU. Upper estimate additionally includes DD.)
- 83 to 261 are extinct or extinct in the wild:
  - 81 extinct (EX) species (Note: Chart omits extinct (EX) species)
  - 2 extinct in the wild (EW)
  - 171 possibly extinct [CR(PE)]
  - 1 possibly extinct in the wild [CR(PEW)]

As of September 2016, the International Union for Conservation of Nature (IUCN) lists 81 extinct species, 86 possibly extinct species, and two extinct in the wild species of arthropod.

== Centipedes ==
Possibly extinct species

- Mecistocephalus cyclops
- Mecistocephalus sechellarum

== Seed shrimps ==
Extinct species

- Liocypris grandis

== Arachnids ==
Extinct species

- Centrobunus braueri
- Gardiner's giant mite (Dicrogonatus gardineri)
- Caribbean monk seal nasal mite (Halarachne americana)
- Hirstienus nanus
- Metazalmoxis ferruginea
- Peromona erinacea
- Pleorotus braueri
- Sitalcicus gardineri
- Stipax triangulifer
- Thomasettia seychellana

Possibly extinct species

- Afrogarypus seychellesensis
- Biantes parvulus
- Euso muehlenbergi
- Gamasomorpha austera
- Holozoster ovalis
- Ibalonius lomani
- Idioctis intertidalis
- Mitraceras crassipalpum
- Moneta coercervea
- Nesiergus gardineri
- Nesiergus halophilus
- Paccius quadridentatus
- Seychellia lodoiceae
- Sitalcicus incertus
- Steriphopus lacertosus
- Voraptus tenellus

== Millipedes ==
Extinct species

- Eucarlia alluaudi
- Orthomorpha crinita
- Spirobolellus praslinus

Possibly extinct species

- Diglossosternoides curiosus
- Rhinotus albifrons
- Spirobolellus simplex

== Entognatha ==
Possibly extinct species

- Ceratophysella sp. 'HC'
- Delamarephorura tami

== Maxillopoda ==
Extinct species

- Afrocyclops pauliani
- Tropodiaptomus ctenopus

== Malacostracans ==
Includes crabs, lobsters, crayfish, shrimp, krill, woodlice, and many others.

Extinct species

- Cambarellus alvarezi
- Macrobrachium leptodactylus
- Sooty crayfish (Pacifastacus nigrescens)
- Sandhills crayfish (Procambarus angustatus)
- Rubious cave amphipod (Stygobromus lucifugus)
- Pasadena freshwater shrimp (Syncaris pasadenae)

Possibly extinct species

- Atya brachyrhinus
- Cambarellus areolatus
- White spring cave crayfish (Cambarus veitchorum)
- Caridina apodosis
- Caridina yilong
- Cryphiops luscus
- Macrobrachium denticulatum
- Macrobrachium oxyphilus
- Macrobrachium purpureamanus
- Macrobrachium scorteccii
- Florida cave shrimp (Palaemonetes cummingi)
- Perbrinckia gabadagei
- Big-cheeked cave crayfish (Procambarus delicatus)
- Procambarus paradoxus
- Sinodina acutipoda
- Strengeriana antioquensis
- Tehuana veracruzana

Extinct in the wild species

- Socorro isopod (Thermosphaeroma thermophilum)

== Insects ==
Extinct species

- Pecatonica river mayfly (Acanthametropus pecatonica)
- Poko noctuid moth (Agrotis crinigera)
- Midway noctuid moth (Agrotis fasciata)
- Kerr's noctuid moth (Agrotis kerri)
- Laysan noctuid moth (Agrotis laysanensis)
- Agrotis photophila
- Procellaris grotis noctuid moth (Agrotis procellaris)
- Robert's stonefly (Alloperla roberti)
- Chestnut ermine moth (Argyresthia castaneela)
- Campsicnemus mirabilis
- Clavicoccus erinaceus
- Coleophora leucochrysella
- Central Valley grasshopper (Conozoa hyalina)
- Deloneura immaculata
- Drosophila lanaiensis
- Dryophthorus distinguendus
- American chestnut moth (Ectodemia castaneae)
- Phleophagan chestnut moth (Ectodemia phleophaga)
- Genophantis leahi
- Xerces blue (Glaucopsyche xerces)
- Confused moth (Helicoverpa confusa)
- Minute noctuid moth (Helicoverpa minuta)
- Tobias' caddisfly (Hydropsyche tobiasi)
- Mono Lake diving beetle (Hygrotus artus)
- Laysan dropseed noctuid moth (Hypena laysanensis)
- Hilo noctuid moth (Hypena newelli)
- Lovegrass noctuid moth (Hypena plagiota)
- Kaholuamano noctuid moth (Hypena senicula)
- Saint Helena earwig (Labidura herculeana)
- Lepidochrysops hypopolia
- Levuana moth (Levuana iridescens)
- Libythea cinyras
- Margatteoidea amoena
- Mecodema punctellum
- Megadytes ducalis
- Maui upland damselfly (Megalagrion jugorum)
- Rocky Mountain locust (Melanoplus spretus)
- Antioch dunes shieldback katydid (Neduba extincta)
- Oeobia sp.
- Laysan weevil (Oodemas laysanensis)
- Robust burrowing mayfly (Pentagenia robusta)
- Phyllococcus oahuensis
- Ridley's stick insect (Pseudobactricia ridleyi)
- Rhantus novacaledoniae
- Rhantus orbignyi
- Rhantus papuanus
- Castle Lake caddisfly (Rhyacophila amabilis)
- Rhyncogonus bryani
- Kona giant looper moth (Scotorythra megalophylla)
- Ko'olau giant looper moth (Scotorythra nesiotes)
- Perrin's cave beetle (Siettitia balsetensis)
- Stonemyia velutina
- Chestnut clearwing moth (Tischeria perplexa)
- Athens caddisfly (Triaenodes phalacris)
- Three-tooth caddisfly (Triaenodes tridonata)
- Fort ross weevil (Trigonoscuta rossi)
- Yorba linda weevil (Trigonoscuta yorbalindae)
- Ola'a peppered looper moth (Tritocleis microphylla)
- California Condor Louse (Colpocephalum californici)

Possibly extinct species

- Morogoro pretty grasshopper (Acanthothericles bicoloripes)
- Zanzibar giant forest grasshopper (Allaga ambigua)
- Spined dwarf mantis (Ameles fasciipennis)
- Andrena labiatula
- Usambara splendid grasshopper (Anischnansis burtti)
- Anisogomphus solitaris
- Balta crassivenosa
- Bombus rubriventris
- Togo red jewel (Chlorocypha jejuna)
- Morogoro monkey grasshopper (Chromomastax movogovodia)
- Mpwapwa silent grasshopper (Chromousambilla burtti)
- Maspalomas bow-legged grasshopper (Dericorys minutus)
- Disparoneura ramajana
- Drepanosticta adami
- Drepanosticta austeni
- Drepanosticta montana
- Drepanosticta submontana
- Enallagma maldivensis
- Kilosa noble grasshopper (Eupropacris abbreviata)
- Mlingano monkey grasshopper (Euschmidtia bidens)
- Burtt's monkey grasshopper (Euschmidtia burtti)
- Dirsh's monkey grasshopper (Euschmidtia dirshi)
- Phipps' monkey grasshopper (Euschmidtia phippsi)
- Dar-es-salaam monkey grasshopper (Euschmidtia viridifasciata)
- Gran Canaria bush-cricket (Evergoderes cabrerai)
- Heliogomphus lyratus
- Heliogomphus nietneri
- Heteragrion peregrinum
- Holocompsa pusilla
- Macromia flinti
- Megachile cypricola
- Molokai damselfly (Megalagrion molokaiense)
- Metaleptobasis gibbosa
- Nomada siciliensis
- Elusive skimmer (Orthetrum rubens)
- Palaemnema edmondi
- Zulu ambush katydid (Peringueyella zulu)
- Perissolestes remus
- Pieris wollastoni
- Seychelles wingless groundhopper (Procytettix fusiformis)
- Three-lobed bush-cricket (Rhacocleis trilobata)
- Sliferia similis
- Theganopteryx grisea
- Theganopteryx liturata
- Theganopteryx scotti
- Peringuey's seedpod shieldback (Thoracistus peringueyi)

Extinct in the wild species

- Oahu deceptor bush cricket (Leptogryllus deceptor)

== See also ==
- List of least concern arthropods
- List of near threatened arthropods
- List of vulnerable arthropods
- List of endangered arthropods
- List of critically endangered arthropods
- List of data deficient arthropods
