= List of recently extinct insects =

- Extinct in the wild (EW): 1 species
- Critically endangered (CR): 520 species
- Endangered (EN): 1,132 species
- Vulnerable (VU): 1,082 species
- Near threatened (NT, LR/cd): 897 species
- Least concern (LC): 6,802 species
- Data deficient (DD): 3,255 species
Insect species (IUCN, 2025-2)
- 13,696 extant species have been evaluated
- 10,441 of those are fully assessed (Note: excludes data deficient evaluations.)
- 7,699 are not threatened at present
- 2,742 to 5,997 are threatened (Note: Threatened comprises CR, EN and VU. Upper estimate additionally includes DD.)
- 59 to 175 are extinct or extinct in the wild:
  - 58 extinct (EX) species (Note: Chart omits extinct (EX) species)
  - 1 extinct in the wild (EW)
  - 116 possibly extinct [CR(PE)]
  - 0 possibly extinct in the wild [CR(PEW)]

As of July 2016, the International Union for Conservation of Nature (IUCN) lists 58 extinct species, 46 possibly extinct species, and one species of insect which is extinct in the wild.

== Caddisflies ==
Extinct species

- Tobias' caddisfly (Hydropsyche tobiasi)
- Castle Lake caddisfly (Rhyacophila amabilis)
- Athens caddisfly (Triaenodes phalacris)
- Three-tooth caddisfly (Triaenodes tridonata)

== Mayflies ==
Extinct species

- Pecatonica river mayfly (Acanthametropus pecatonica)
- Robust burrowing mayfly (Pentagenia robusta)

== Flies ==
Extinct species

- Campsicnemus mirabilis
- Drosophila lanaiensis

== Earwigs ==
Extinct species

- Saint Helena earwig (Labidura herculeana)

== Lice ==
Extinct species

- California Condor Louse (Colpocephalum californici)

== Plecoptera ==
Extinct species

- Robert's stonefly (Alloperla roberti)

== Hemiptera ==
Extinct species

- Clavicoccus erinaceus
- Phyllococcus oahuensis

== Blattodea ==
Extinct species

- Margatteoidea amoena

Possibly extinct species

- Balta crassivenosa
- Holocompsa pusilla
- Sliferia similis
- Theganopteryx grisea
- Theganopteryx liturata
- Theganopteryx scotti

Extinct in the wild

- Simandoa conserfariam

== Phasmatodea ==
Extinct species

- Ridley's stick insect (Pseudobactricia ridleyi)

== Orthoptera ==
Extinct species

- Central Valley grasshopper (Conozoa hyalina)
- Rocky Mountain locust (Melanoplus spretus)
- Antioch dunes shieldback katydid (Neduba extincta)

Possibly extinct species

- Morogoro pretty grasshopper (Acanthothericles bicoloripes)
- Zanzibar giant forest grasshopper (Allaga ambigua)
- Usambara splendid grasshopper (Anischnansis burtti)
- Morogoro monkey grasshopper (Chromomastax movogovodia)
- Mpwapwa silent grasshopper (Chromousambilla burtti)
- Maspalomas bow-legged grasshopper (Dericorys minutus)
- Kilosa noble grasshopper (Eupropacris abbreviata)
- Mlingano monkey grasshopper (Euschmidtia bidens)
- Burtt's monkey grasshopper (Euschmidtia burtti)
- Dirsh's monkey grasshopper (Euschmidtia dirshi)
- Phipps' monkey grasshopper (Euschmidtia phippsi)
- Dar-es-salaam monkey grasshopper (Euschmidtia viridifasciata)
- Gran Canaria bush-cricket (Evergoderes cabrerai)
- Zulu ambush katydid (Peringueyella zulu)
- Seychelles shortwinged groundhopper (Procytettix fusiformis)
- Three-lobed bush-cricket (Rhacocleis trilobata)
- Peringuey's seedpod shieldback (Thoracistus peringueyi)

Extinct in the wild species

- Oahu deceptor bush cricket (Leptogryllus deceptor)

== Hymenopterans ==
Possibly extinct species

- Andrena labiatula
- Bombus franklini
- Bombus rubriventris
- Nomada siciliensis

== Mantodeans ==
Possibly extinct species

- Spined dwarf mantis (Ameles fasciipennis)

== Lepidoptera ==
Moths and butterflies

Extinct species

- Poko noctuid moth (Agrotis crinigera)
- Midway noctuid moth (Agrotis fasciata)
- Kerr's noctuid moth (Agrotis kerri)
- Laysan noctuid moth (Agrotis laysanensis)
- Agrotis photophila
- Procellaris grotis noctuid moth (Agrotis procellaris)
- Chestnut ermine moth (Argyresthia castaneela)
- Coleophora leucochrysella
- Deloneura immaculata
- Phleophagan chestnut moth (Ectodemia phleophaga)
- Genophantis leahi
- Xerces blue (Glaucopsyche xerces)
- Confused moth (Helicoverpa confusa)
- Minute noctuid moth (Helicoverpa minuta)
- Laysan dropseed noctuid moth (Hypena laysanensis)
- Hilo noctuid moth (Hypena newelli)
- Lovegrass noctuid moth (Hypena plagiota)
- Kaholuamano noctuid moth (Hypena senicula)
- Lepidochrysops hypopolia
- Levuana moth (Levuana iridescens)
- Libythea cinyras
- Kona giant looper moth (Scotorythra megalophylla)
- Ko'olau giant looper moth (Scotorythra nesiotes)
- Chestnut clearwing moth (Tischeria perplexa)
- Ola'a peppered looper moth (Tritocleis microphylla)
- Sloane's urania (Urania sloanus)

Possibly extinct species

- Pieris wollastoni

== Beetles ==
Extinct species

- Apteroessa grossa
- Dryophthorus distinguendus
- Mono Lake diving beetle (Hygrotus artus)
- Mecodema punctellum
- Megadytes ducalis
- Laysan weevil (Oodemas laysanensis)
- Rhantus novacaledoniae
- Rhantus orbignyi
- Rhantus papuanus
- Rhyncogonus bryani
- Perrin's cave beetle (Siettitia balsetensis)
- Fort Ross weevil (Trigonoscuta rossi)
- Yorba linda weevil (Trigonoscuta yorbalindae)

Possibly extinct species

- Xylotrechus gemellus
- Zamodes obscurus

== Odonata ==
Includes dragonflies and damselflies.

Extinct species

- Maui upland damselfly (Megalagrion jugorum)

Possibly extinct species

- Anisogomphus solitaris
- Togo red jewel (Chlorocypha jejuna)
- Disparoneura ramajana
- Drepanosticta adami
- Drepanosticta austeni
- Drepanosticta montana
- Drepanosticta submontana
- Enallagma maldivensis
- Heliogomphus lyratus
- Heliogomphus nietneri
- Heteragrion peregrinum
- Macromia flinti
- Molokai damselfly (Megalagrion molokaiense)
- Metaleptobasis gibbosa
- Elusive skimmer (Orthetrum rubens)
- Palaemnema edmondi
- Perissolestes remus

== See also ==
- List of least concern insects
- List of near threatened insects
- List of vulnerable insects
- List of endangered insects
- List of critically endangered insects
- List of data deficient insects
