= List of critically endangered insects =

- Extinct in the wild (EW): 1 species
- Critically endangered (CR): 520 species
- Endangered (EN): 1,132 species
- Vulnerable (VU): 1,082 species
- Near threatened (NT, LR/cd): 897 species
- Least concern (LC): 6,802 species
- Data deficient (DD): 3,255 species
Insect species (IUCN, 2025-2)
- 13,696 extant species have been evaluated
- 10,441 of those are fully assessed (Note: excludes data deficient evaluations.)
- 7,699 are not threatened at present
- 2,742 to 5,997 are threatened (Note: Threatened comprises CR, EN and VU. Upper estimate additionally includes DD.)
- 59 to 175 are extinct or extinct in the wild:
  - 58 extinct (EX) species (Note: Chart omits extinct (EX) species)
  - 1 extinct in the wild (EW)
  - 116 possibly extinct [CR(PE)]
  - 0 possibly extinct in the wild [CR(PEW)]

Critically endangered (CR) species face an extremely high risk of extinction in the wild.

As of July 2016, the International Union for Conservation of Nature (IUCN) listed 195 critically endangered insect species, including 46 which are tagged as possibly extinct. Of all evaluated insect species, 3.2% are listed as critically endangered. The IUCN also lists two insect subspecies as critically endangered.

No subpopulations of insects have been evaluated by the IUCN.

Additionally 1702 insect species (28% of those evaluated) are listed as data deficient, meaning there is insufficient information for a full assessment of conservation status. As these species typically have small distributions and/or populations, they are intrinsically likely to be threatened, according to the IUCN. While the category data deficient indicates that no assessment of extinction risk has been made for the taxa, the IUCN notes that it may be appropriate to give them "the same degree of attention as threatened taxa, at least until their status can be assessed".

This is a complete list of critically endangered insect species and subspecies as evaluated by the IUCN. Species considered possibly extinct by the IUCN are marked as such.

== Earwigs ==
- Antisolabis seychellensis
- Chaetolabia fryeri
- Chaetospania gardineri

== Hemiptera ==
- Vesk's plant-louse (Acizzia veski)
- Banksia montana mealybug (Pseudococcus markharveyi)
- Barrett's plant-louse (Trioza barrettae)

== Blattodea ==
- Balta crassivenosa (possibly extinct)
- Desroches cockroach (Delosia ornata)
- Holocompsa pusilla (possibly extinct)
- Hololeptoblatta pandanicola
- Sliferia similis (possibly extinct)
- Theganopteryx grisea (possibly extinct)
- Theganopteryx liturata (possibly extinct)
- Theganopteryx scotti (possibly extinct)

== Orthoptera ==
There are 72 species in the order Orthoptera assessed as critically endangered.

=== Euschmidtiids ===
- Morogoro monkey grasshopper (Chromomastax movogovodia) (possibly extinct)
- Mlingano monkey grasshopper (Euschmidtia bidens) (possibly extinct)
- Burtt's monkey grasshopper (Euschmidtia burtti) (possibly extinct)
- Dirsh's monkey grasshopper (Euschmidtia dirshi) (possibly extinct)
- Phipps' monkey grasshopper (Euschmidtia phippsi) (possibly extinct)
- Usambara monkey grasshopper (Euschmidtia uvarovi)
- Dar-es-salaam monkey grasshopper (Euschmidtia viridifasciata) (possibly extinct)

=== Crickets ===
- Gryllapterus tomentosus
- Metioche payendeei
- Metioche superbus
- Mahé boulder cricket (Phalangacris alluaudi)
- Seychellesia nitidula

=== Acridids ===
- Zanzibar giant forest grasshopper (Allaga ambigua) (possibly extinct)
- Usambara splendid grasshopper (Anischnansis burtti) (possibly extinct)
- Uluguru forest grasshopper (Burttia sylvatica)
- Adana grasshopper (Chorthippus antecessor)
- Bozdagh grasshopper (Chorthippus bozdaghi)
- Ilgaz mountain grasshopper (Chorthippus ilkazi)
- Epirus dancing grasshopper (Chorthippus lacustris)
- Uluguru mountain grasshopper (Cyphocerastis uluguruensis)
- Maspalomas bow-legged grasshopper (Dericorys minutus) (possibly extinct)
- Kilosa noble grasshopper (Eupropacris abbreviata) (possibly extinct)
- Gastrimargus immaculatus
- Myrmeleotettix ethicus
- Triandafilia mountain grasshopper (Oropodisma lagrecai)
- Willemse's mountain grasshopper (Oropodisma willemsei)
- East Usambara speckled grasshopper (Physocrobylus tessa)
- Schayera baiulus

=== Tettigoniids ===
- Mount Coke false shieldback (Acilacris furcatus)
- Kristin's false shieldback (Acilacris kristinae)
- Santa Monica shieldback katydid (Aglaothorax longipennis)
- Black-spotted false shieldback (Aroegas nigroornatus)
- Pondo flat-necked shieldback (Arytropteris pondo)
- Fer's marbled bush-cricket (Eupholidoptera feri)
- Gran Canaria bush-cricket (Evergoderes cabrerai) (possibly extinct)
- Hemisaga elongata
- Middlekauf's shieldback katydid (Idiostatus middlekaufi)
- Ixalodectes flectocercus
- Nanodectes bulbicercus
- Pachysaga strobila
- Imperiled grass false shieldback (Paracilacris periclitatus)
- Paradecolya briseferi
- Giona Greek bush-cricket (Parnassiana gionica)
- Menalon Greek bush-cricket (Parnassiana menalon)
- Akarnanika Greek bush-cricket (Parnassiana nigromarginata)
- Panaitoliko Greek bush-cricket (Parnassiana panaetolikon)
- Parnassos Greek bush-cricket (Parnassiana parnassica)
- Zulu ambush katydid (Peringueyella zulu) (possibly extinct)
- Cyprian grey bush-cricket (Platycleis kibris)
- Calbali bush-cricket (Psorodonotus ebneri)
- Three-lobed bush-cricket (Rhacocleis trilobata) (possibly extinct)
- Rodriguesiophisis spinifera
- Sardinian grey bush-cricket (Sardoplatycleis galvagnii)
- Arboreal seedpod shieldback (Thoracistus arboreus)
- Peringuey's seedpod shieldback (Thoracistus peringueyi) (possibly extinct)
- Transkei shieldback (Transkeidectes multidentis)

=== Other Orthoptera species ===
- Morogoro pretty grasshopper (Acanthothericles bicoloripes) (possibly extinct)
- Palma stick grasshopper (Acrostira euphorbiae)
- Tenerife stick grasshopper (Acrostira tenerifae)
- Arachnocephalus medvedevi
- Castleton's flightless katydid (Austrodontura castletoni)
- Cave katydid (Cedarbergeniana imperfecta)
- Mpwapwa silent grasshopper (Chromousambilla burtti) (possibly extinct)
- Seychelles crested groundhopper (Coptottigia cristata)
- Duplessis' agile katydid (Griffiniana duplessisae)
- Crau plain grasshopper (Prionotropis rhodanica)
- Seychelles shortwinged groundhopper (Procytettix fusiformis) (possibly extinct)
- Marais' lace-winged katydid (Pseudosaga maraisi)
- Pyrgacris descampsi
- Pyrgacris relictus
- Torreya pygmy grasshopper (Tettigidea empedonepia)
- San Torini cave-cricket (Troglophilus marinae)

== Hymenoptera ==
- Adetomyrma venatrix
- Ammobates dusmeti
- Andrena labiatula (possibly extinct)
- Sri Lankan relict ant (Aneuretus simoni)
- Rusty patched bumble bee (Bombus affinis)
- Franklin's bumblebee (Bombus franklini)
- Bombus rubriventris (possibly extinct)
- Suckley cuckoo bumble bee (Bombus suckleyi)
- Variable cuckoo bumblebee (Bombus variabilis)
- Megachile cypricola (possibly extinct)
- Nomada siciliensis (possibly extinct)
- Australian ant (Nothomyrmecia macrops)

== Lepidoptera ==
Moths and butterflies

- Actinote zikani
- Marion's plume moth (Agdistis marionae)
- Cotrell's daisy copper (Chrysoritis cotrelli)
- Prairie sphinx moth (Euproserpinus wiesti)
- Natterer's Longwing (Heliconius nattereri)
- David's tiger (Parantica davidi)
- Pieris wollastoni (possibly extinct)
- Bolland's blue (Polyommatus bollandi)
- Macedonian grayling (Pseudochazara cingovskii)
- Sinai baton blue (Pseudophilotes sinaicus)

== Beetles ==
- Coral pink sand dunes tiger beetle (Cicindela albissima)
- Colophon berrisfordi
- Colophon cassoni
- Colophon montisatris
- Colophon primosi
- Delta green ground beetle (Elaphrus viridis)
- Glaphyra bassettii
- Canterbury knobbled weevil (Hadramphus tuberculatus)
- Edith's fungus weevil (Homoeodera edithia)
- Click beetle-like fungus weevil (Homoeodera elateroides)
- Greater fungus weevil (Homoeodera major)
- Bark beetle-like fungus weevil (Homoeodera scolytoides)
- Hydrotarsus compunctus
- Meladema imbricata
- American burying beetle (Nicrophorus americanus)
- Cromwell chafer beetle (Prodontria lewisi)
- Propomacrus cypriacus
- Thorectes coloni

== Odonata ==
Includes dragonflies and damselflies.

Species

- Acanthagrion taxaense
- Allocnemis maccleeryi
- Amanipodagrion gilliesi
- Anisogomphus solitaris (possibly extinct)
- Sydney hawk (Austrocordulia leonardi)
- Boninagrion ezoin
- Boninthemis insularis
- Togo red jewel (Chlorocypha jejuna) (possibly extinct)
- Coenagriocnemis insularis
- Cryptophaea saukra
- Disparoneura ramajana (possibly extinct)
- Drepanosticta adami (possibly extinct)
- Drepanosticta austeni (possibly extinct)
- Merry shadowdamsel (Drepanosticta hilaris)
- Drepanosticta montana (possibly extinct)
- Drepanosticta submontana (possibly extinct)
- Echo maxima
- Smoky-winged threadtail (Elattoneura leucostigma)
- Elattoneura pluotae
- Elga newtonsantosi
- Enallagma maldivensis (possibly extinct)
- Erythrodiplax acantha
- Erythrodiplax nivea
- Sri Lanka grappletail (Heliogomphus ceylonicus)
- Heliogomphus lyratus (possibly extinct)
- Heliogomphus nietneri (possibly extinct)
- Heteragrion peregrinum (possibly extinct)
- Indolestes boninensis
- Libellula angelina
- Macromia flinti (possibly extinct)
- Atlantic helicopter (Mecistogaster pronoti)
- Crimson Hawaiian damselfly (Megalagrion leptodemas)
- Molokai damselfly (Megalagrion molokaiense) (possibly extinct)
- Flying earwig Hawaiian damselfly (Megalagrion nesiotes)
- Metaleptobasis gibbosa (possibly extinct)
- Micrathyria kleerekoperi
- Micromacromia miraculosa
- Minagrion ribeiroi
- Bizarre junglewatcher (Neodythemis takamandensis)
- Nesolestes nigeriensis
- Onychogomphus boudoti
- Mulanje damsel (Oreocnemis phoenix)
- Elusive skimmer (Orthetrum rubens) (possibly extinct)
- Palaemnema croceicauda
- Palaemnema edmondi (possibly extinct)
- Gambles's relic (Pentaphlebia gamblesi)
- Perissolestes remus (possibly extinct)
- Kenya jewel (Platycypha amboniensis)
- Proischnura polychromatica
- Proplatycnemis pembipes
- Protosticta gracilis
- Protosticta plicata
- Protosticta rozendalorum
- Pseudagrion mascagnii
- Greek red damsel (Pyrrhosoma elisabethae)
- Rhinocypha ogasawarensis
- Risiocnemis seidenschwarzi
- Emerald Sri Lanka spreadwing (Sinhalestes orientalis)
- Sympetrum evanescens
- Principe dropwing (Trithemis nigra)
- Streamertail (Zygonychidium gracile)

Subspecies

- Chlorogomphus brunneus keramensis
- Delphi cordulegaster (Cordulegaster helladica kastalia)

== Other insect species ==
- Scott's stick insect (Carausius scotti)
- Lord Howe Island stick insect (Dryococelus australis)
- Glyptotermes scotti
- Pygmy hog-sucking louse (Haematopinus oliveri)
- Procryptotermes fryeri
- Mount Donna Buang wingless stonefly (Riekoperla darlingtoni)

== See also ==
- Lists of IUCN Red List critically endangered species
- List of least concern insects
- List of near threatened insects
- List of vulnerable insects
- List of endangered insects
- List of recently extinct insects
- List of data deficient insects
