= List of damselflies of the world (Platystictidae) =

- Ceylonosticta alwisi
- Ceylonosticta anamia
- Ceylonosticta bine
- Ceylonosticta mirifica
- Ceylonosticta mojca
- Ceylonosticta nancyae
- Ceylonosticta rupasinghe
- Ceylonosticta venusta
- Drepanosticta actaeon
- Drepanosticta adami
- Drepanosticta amboinensis
- Drepanosticta anascephala
- Drepanosticta annandalei
- Drepanosticta annulata
- Drepanosticta arcuata
- Drepanosticta aries
- Drepanosticta attala
- Drepanosticta auriculata
- Drepanosticta austeni
- Drepanosticta barbatula
- Drepanosticta bartelsi
- Drepanosticta belyshevi
- Drepanosticta berinchangensis
- Drepanosticta berlandi
- Drepanosticta bicolor
- Drepanosticta bicornuta
- Drepanosticta bifida
- Drepanosticta bispana
- Drepanosticta brincki
- Drepanosticta brownelli
- Drepanosticta carmichaeli
- Drepanosticta ceratophora
- Drepanosticta claaseni
- Drepanosticta clavata
- Drepanosticta conica
- Drepanosticta crenitis
- Drepanosticta dendrolagina
- Drepanosticta dentifera
- Drepanosticta digna
- Drepanosticta doisuthepensis
- Drepanosticta dorcadion
- Drepanosticta drusilla
- Drepanosticta dulitensis
- Drepanosticta dupophila
- Drepanosticta elongata
- Drepanosticta ephippiata
- Drepanosticta eucera
- Drepanosticta exoleta
- Drepanosticta floresiana
- Drepanosticta fontinalis
- Drepanosticta forficula
- Drepanosticta fraseri
- Drepanosticta gazella
- Drepanosticta halmachera
- Drepanosticta halterata
- Drepanosticta hamadryas
- Drepanosticta hamulifera
- Drepanosticta hilaris
- Drepanosticta hongkongensis
- Drepanosticta inconspicua
- Drepanosticta inversa
- Drepanosticta jurzitzai
- Drepanosticta khaochongensis
- Drepanosticta kruegeri
- Drepanosticta lankanensis
- Drepanosticta lepyricollis
- Drepanosticta lestoides
- Drepanosticta lymetta
- Drepanosticta magna
- Drepanosticta marsyas
- Drepanosticta megametta
- Drepanosticta misoolensis
- Drepanosticta moluccana
- Drepanosticta monoceros
- Drepanosticta montana
- Drepanosticta moorei
- Drepanosticta mylitta
- Drepanosticta nietneri
- Drepanosticta obiensis
- Drepanosticta palauensis
- Drepanosticta pan
- Drepanosticta penicillata
- Drepanosticta philippa
- Drepanosticta polychromatica
- Drepanosticta psygma
- Drepanosticta quadrata
- Drepanosticta robusta
- Drepanosticta rudicula
- Drepanosticta rufostigma
- Drepanosticta sembilanensis
- Drepanosticta septima
- Drepanosticta sharpi
- Drepanosticta siebersi
- Drepanosticta silenus
- Drepanosticta sinhalensis
- Drepanosticta siu
- Drepanosticta spatulifera
- Drepanosticta starmuehlneri
- Drepanosticta submontana
- Drepanosticta subtropica
- Drepanosticta sundana
- Drepanosticta taurus
- Drepanosticta tenella
- Drepanosticta trimaculata
- Drepanosticta tropica
- Drepanosticta versicolor
- Drepanosticta vietnamica
- Drepanosticta viridis
- Drepanosticta walli
- Drepanosticta watuwilensis
- Drepanosticta zhoui
- Palaemnaea abbreviata
- Palaemnema apicalis
- Palaemnema azupizui
- Palaemnema baltodanoi
- Palaemnema bilobulata
- Palaemnema brevignoni
- Palaemnema brucei
- Palaemnema brucelli
- Palaemnema carmelita
- Palaemnema chiriquita
- Palaemnema clementia
- Palaemnema collaris
- Palaemnema croceicauda
- Palaemnema cyclohamulata
- Palaemnema dentata
- Palaemnema desiderata
- Palaemnema distadens
- Palaemnema domina
- Palaemnema edmondi
- Palaemnema gigantula
- Palaemnema joanetta
- Palaemnema lorena
- Palaemnema martini
- Palaemnema melanocauda
- Palaemnema melanostigma
- Palaemnema melanota
- Palaemnema melanura
- Palaemnema mutans
- Palaemnema nathalia
- Palaemnema orientalis
- Palaemnema paulicaxa
- Palaemnema paulicoba
- Palaemnema paulina
- Palaemnema paulirica
- Palaemnema paulitaba
- Palaemnema paulitoyaca
- Palaemnema peruviana
- Palaemnema picicaudata
- Palaemnema reventazoni
- Palaemnema spinulata
- Palaemnema tepuica
- Platysticta apicalis
- Platysticta deccanensis
- Platysticta maculata
- Platysticta secreta
- Platysticta serendibica
- Protosticta antelopoides
- Protosticta beaumonti
- Protosticta bivittata
- Protosticta coomansi
- Protosticta curiosa
- Protosticta damacornu
- Protosticta davenporti
- Protosticta feronia
- Protosticta foersteri
- Protosticta fraseri
- Protosticta geijskesi
- Protosticta gracilis
- Protosticta grandis
- Protosticta gravelyi
- Protosticta hearseyi
- Protosticta himalaica
- Protosticta khaosoidaoensis
- Protosticta kiautai
- Protosticta kinabaluensis
- Protosticta linduensis
- Protosticta marenae
- Protosticta maurenbrecheri
- Protosticta medusa
- Protosticta mortoni
- Protosticta pariwonoi
- Protosticta reslae
- Protosticta robusta
- Protosticta rozendalorum
- Protosticta rufostigma
- Protosticta sanguinostigma
- Protosticta simplicinervis
- Protosticta taipokauensis
- Protosticta trilobata
- Protosticta uncata
- Protosticta vanderstarrei
- Sinosticta hainanense
- Sinosticta ogatai
