= Drepanosticta fraseri =

Fraser's shadowdamsel

Scientific classification
- Kingdom: Animalia
- Phylum: Arthropoda
- Clade: Pancrustacea
- Class: Insecta
- Order: Odonata
- Suborder: Zygoptera
- Family: Platystictidae
- Genus: Drepanosticta
- Species: D. fraseri

Binomial name
- Drepanosticta fraseri Lieftinck, 1955

Species of damselfly

Drepanosticta fraseri (Fraser's shadowdamsel) is a species of damselfly in the family Platystictidae. It is endemic to Sri Lanka. it is sometimes known as a synonym of Drepanosticta submontana.
