= Drepanosticta =

Scientific classification
- Kingdom: Animalia
- Phylum: Arthropoda
- Clade: Pancrustacea
- Class: Insecta
- Order: Odonata
- Suborder: Zygoptera
- Family: Platystictidae
- Subfamily: Protostictinae
- Genus: Drepanosticta; Laidlaw, 1917

Species
- See text

Genus of damselflies

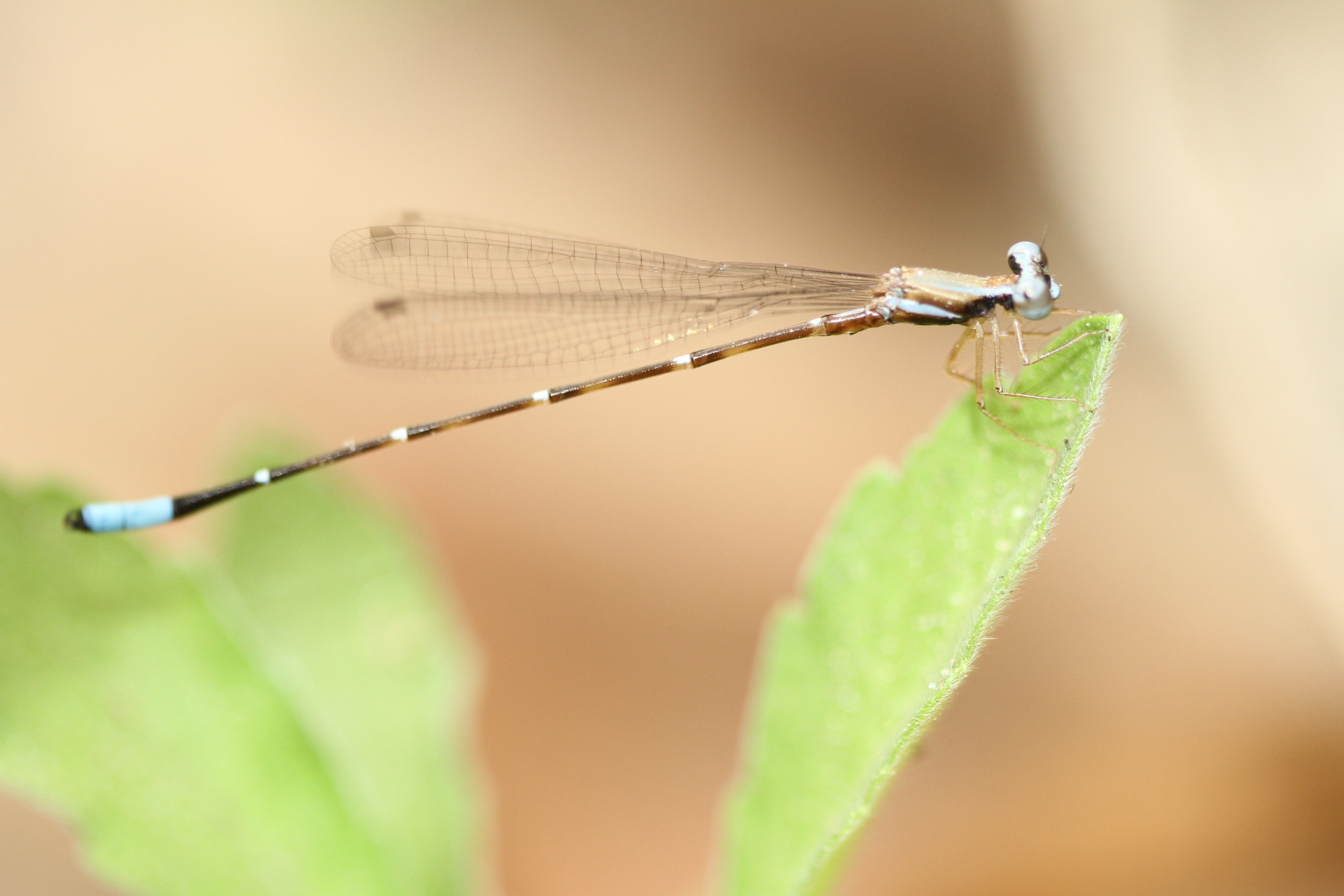

Drepanosticta is a genus of damselfly in the family Platystictidae, and subfamily Protostictinae. Some authors consider some species to be in the genus Ceylonosticta.

== Species ==
The genus includes the following species:

- Drepanosticta actaeon
- Drepanosticta adami
- Drepanosticta amboinensis
- Drepanosticta anascephala
- Drepanosticta annandalei
- Drepanosticta annulata
- Drepanosticta arcuata
- Drepanosticta aries
- Drepanosticta attala
- Drepanosticta auricuata
- Drepanosticta austeni
- Drepanosticta barbatula
- Drepanosticta bartelsi
- Drepanosticta belyshevi
- Drepanosticta berinchangensis
- Drepanosticta berlandi
- Drepanosticta bicolor
- Drepanosticta bicornuta
- Drepanosticta bifida
- Drepanosticta bispana
- Drepanosticta brincki
- Drepanosticta brownelli
- Drepanosticta carmichaeli
- Drepanosticta ceratophora
- Drepanosticta claaseni
- Drepanosticta clavata
- Drepanosticta conica
- Drepanosticta crenitis
- Drepanosticta dendrolagina
- Drepanosticta dentifera
- Drepanosticta digna
- Drepanosticta doisuthepensis
- Drepanosticta dorcadion
- Drepanosticta drusilla
- Drepanosticta dulitensis
- Drepanosticta dupophila
- Drepanosticta elongata
- Drepanosticta emtrai
- Drepanosticta ephippiata
- Drepanosticta eucera
- Drepanosticta exoleta
- Drepanosticta floresiana
- Drepanosticta fontinalis
- Drepanosticta forficula
- Drepanosticta fraseri
- Drepanosticta gazella
- Drepanosticta halmachera
- Drepanosticta halterata
- Drepanosticta hamadryas
- Drepanosticta hamulifera
- Drepanosticta hilaris
- Drepanosticta hongkongensis
- Drepanosticta inconspicua
- Drepanosticta inversa
- Drepanosticta jurzitzai
- Drepanosticta khaochongensis
- Drepanosticta kruegeri
- Drepanosticta lankanensis
- Drepanosticta lepyricollis
- Drepanosticta lestoides
- Drepanosticta lymetta
- Drepanosticta machadoi Theischinger & Richards, 2014
- Drepanosticta magna
- Drepanosticta marsyas
- Drepanosticta megametta
- Drepanosticta misoolensis
- Drepanosticta moluccana
- Drepanosticta monoceros
- Drepanosticta montana
- Drepanosticta moorei
- Drepanosticta mylitta
- Drepanosticta nietneri
- Drepanosticta obiensis
- Drepanosticta palauensis
- Drepanosticta pan
- Drepanosticta penicillata
- Drepanosticta philippa
- Drepanosticta polychromatica
- Drepanosticta psygma
- Drepanosticta quadrata
- Drepanosticta robusta
- Drepanosticta rudicula
- Drepanosticta rufostigma
- Drepanosticta sembilanensis
- Drepanosticta septima
- Drepanosticta sharpi
- Drepanosticta siebersi
- Drepanosticta silenus
- Drepanosticta sinhalensis
- Drepanosticta siu
- Drepanosticta spatulifera
- Drepanosticta starmuehlneri
- Drepanosticta submontana
- Drepanosticta subtropica
- Drepanosticta sundana
- Drepanosticta taurus
- Drepanosticta tenella
- Drepanosticta trimaculata
- Drepanosticta tropica
- Drepanosticta versicolor
- Drepanosticta vietnamica
- Drepanosticta viridis
- Drepanosticta walli
- Drepanosticta watuwilensis
- Drepanosticta wildermuthi Villanueva & Schorr, 2011
- Drepanosticta zhoui
