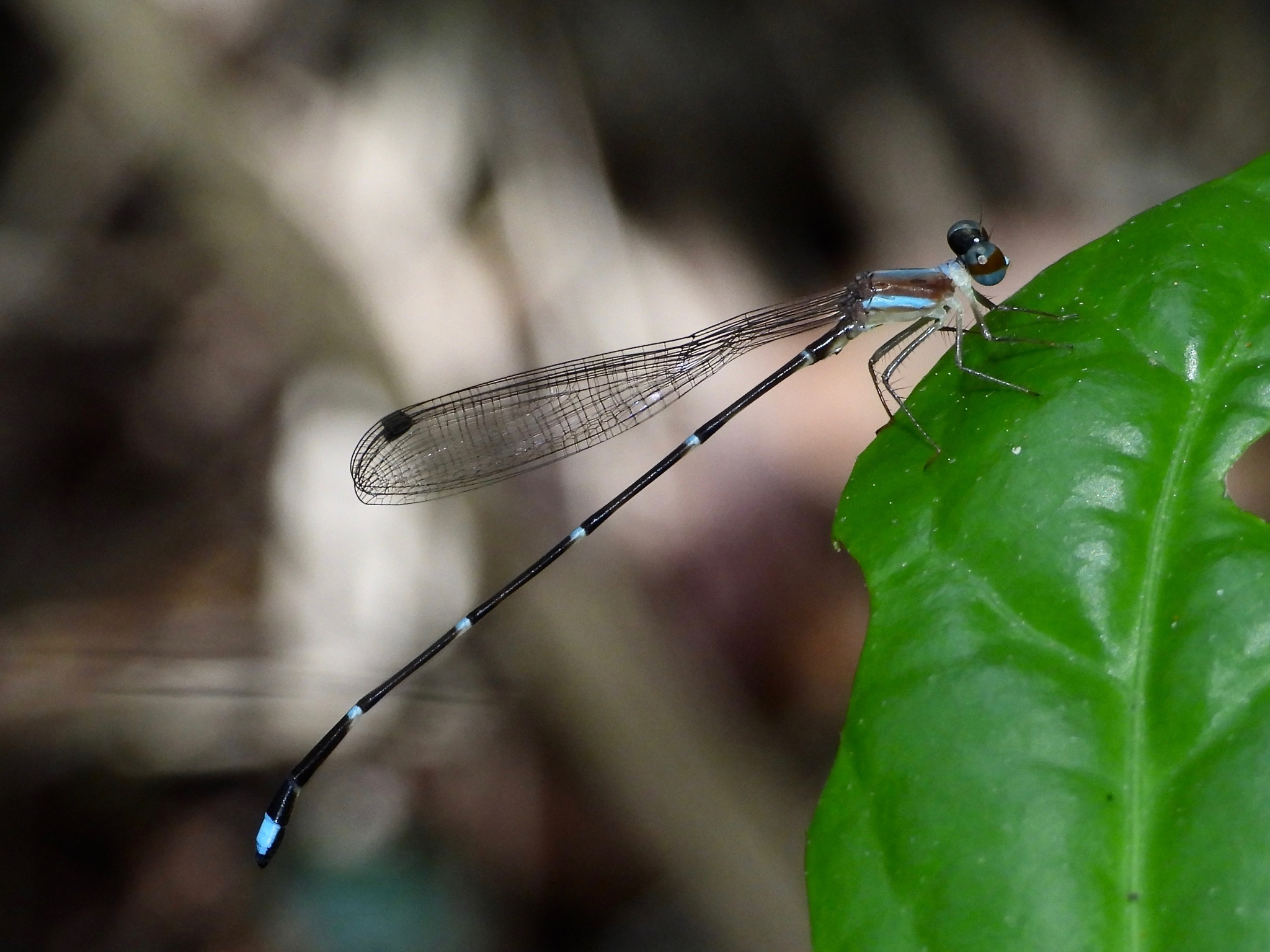

Scientific classification
- Kingdom: Animalia
- Phylum: Arthropoda
- Clade: Pancrustacea
- Class: Insecta
- Order: Odonata
- Suborder: Zygoptera
- Family: Platystictidae
- Genus: Drepanosticta
- Species: D. brincki

Binomial name
- Drepanosticta brincki Lieftinck, 1970

= Drepanosticta brincki =

Brinck's shadowdamsel

Species of damselfly

Drepanosticta brincki (Brinck's shadowdamsel) is a species of damselfly in the family Platystictidae. It is endemic to Sri Lanka.

== Sources ==
- Biodiversity of Sri Lanka
- Animal diversity web
- List of odonates of Sri Lanka
