= Drepanosticta sinhalensis =

Sinhalese shadowdamsel

Scientific classification
- Kingdom: Animalia
- Phylum: Arthropoda
- Clade: Pancrustacea
- Class: Insecta
- Order: Odonata
- Suborder: Zygoptera
- Family: Platystictidae
- Genus: Drepanosticta
- Species: D. sinhalensis

Binomial name
- Drepanosticta sinhalensis Lieftinck, 1971

Species of damselfly

Drepanosticta sinhalensis (Sinhalese shadowdamsel) is a species of damselfly in the family Platystictidae. It is endemic to Sri Lanka.
