= Drepanosticta digna =

Nobel shadowdamsel

Scientific classification
- Kingdom: Animalia
- Phylum: Arthropoda
- Clade: Pancrustacea
- Class: Insecta
- Order: Odonata
- Suborder: Zygoptera
- Family: Platystictidae
- Genus: Drepanosticta
- Species: D. digna

Binomial name
- Drepanosticta digna (Hagen in Selys, 1860)

Species of damselfly

Drepanosticta digna (Nobel shadowdamsel) is a species of damselfly in the family Platystictidae. It is endemic to Sri Lanka.

== Sources ==
- Wildreach
- Animal diversity web
- Sri Lanka Endemics
- List of odonates of Sri Lanka
