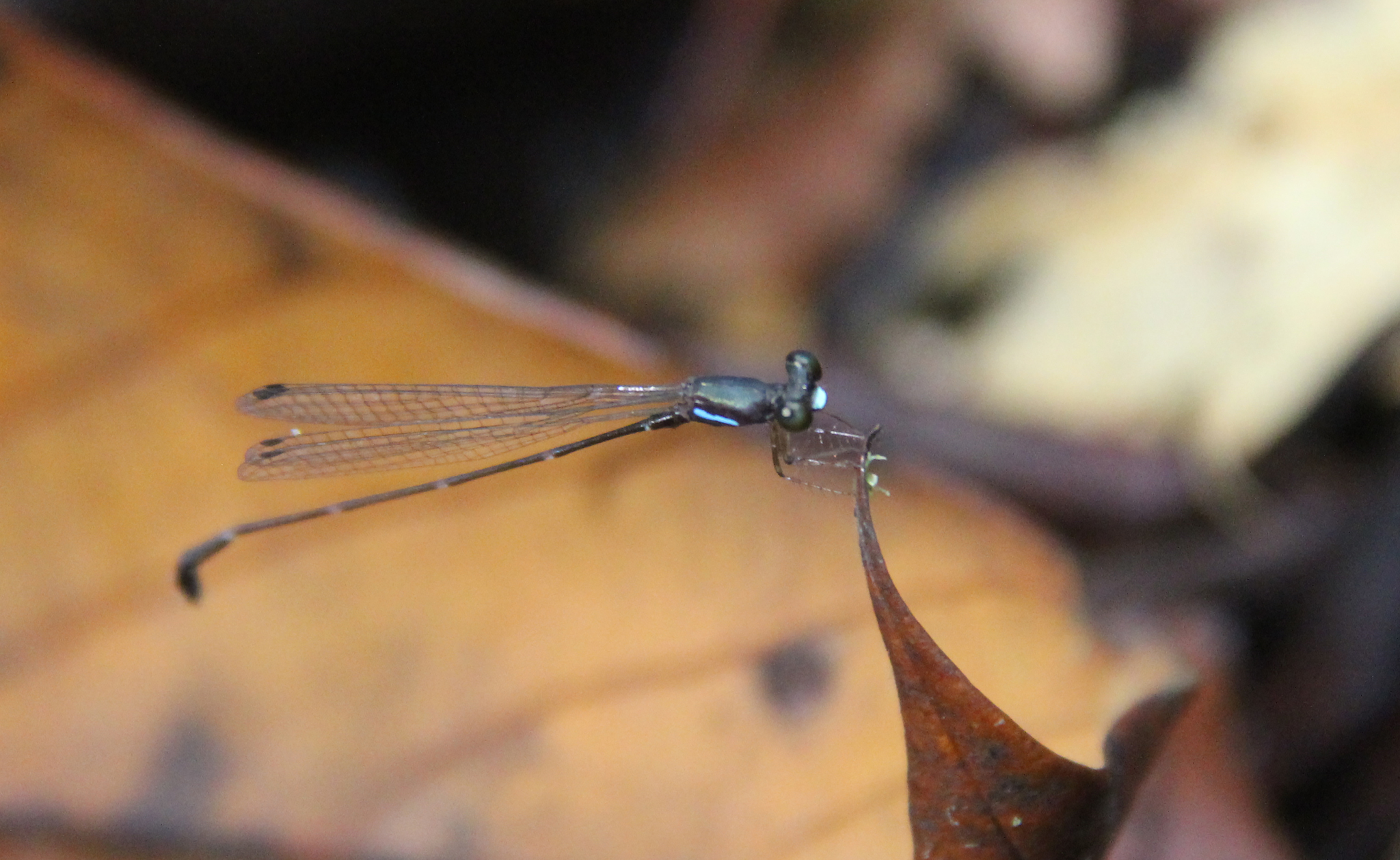

Scientific classification
- Kingdom: Animalia
- Phylum: Arthropoda
- Class: Insecta
- Order: Odonata
- Suborder: Zygoptera
- Family: Platystictidae
- Genus: Drepanosticta
- Species: D. lankanensis

Binomial name
- Drepanosticta lankanensis (Fraser, 1931)

= Drepanosticta lankanensis =

Species of damselfly

Drepanosticta lankanensis, the drooping shadowdamsel, is a species of damselfly in the family Platystictidae. It is endemic to Sri Lanka.
