= Drepanosticta tropica =

Dark-shouldered cornuted shadowdamsel

Scientific classification
- Domain: Eukaryota
- Kingdom: Animalia
- Phylum: Arthropoda
- Class: Insecta
- Order: Odonata
- Suborder: Zygoptera
- Family: Platystictidae
- Genus: Drepanosticta
- Species: D. tropica

Binomial name
- Drepanosticta tropica (Hagen in Selys, 1860)

Species of damselfly

Drepanosticta tropica (dark-shouldered cornuted shadowdamsel) is a species of damselfly in the family Platystictidae. It is endemic to Sri Lanka.
