= Genophantis =

Scientific classification
- Kingdom: Animalia
- Phylum: Arthropoda
- Clade: Pancrustacea
- Class: Insecta
- Order: Lepidoptera
- Family: Pyralidae
- Genus: Genophantis; Meyrick, 1888

Genus of moths

Genophantis is a genus of moths belonging to the family Pyralidae. All species are endemic to Hawaii.

== Species ==
- Genophantis iodora Meyrick, 1888
- Genophantis leahi Swezey, 1910
