= Drepanosticta starmuehlneri =

Starmuehlner's shadowdamsel

Scientific classification
- Domain: Eukaryota
- Kingdom: Animalia
- Phylum: Arthropoda
- Class: Insecta
- Order: Odonata
- Suborder: Zygoptera
- Family: Platystictidae
- Genus: Drepanosticta
- Species: D. starmuehlneri

Binomial name
- Drepanosticta starmuehlneri St. Quentin, 1972

Species of damselfly

Drepanosticta starmuehlneri (Starmuehlner's shadowdamsel) is a species of damselfly in the family Platystictidae. It is endemic to Sri Lanka.
