= Drepanosticta nietneri =

Nietner's shadowdamsel

Scientific classification
- Domain: Eukaryota
- Kingdom: Animalia
- Phylum: Arthropoda
- Class: Insecta
- Order: Odonata
- Suborder: Zygoptera
- Family: Platystictidae
- Genus: Drepanosticta
- Species: D. nietneri

Binomial name
- Drepanosticta nietneri (Fraser, 1931)

Species of damselfly

Drepanosticta nietneri (Nietner's shadowdamsel) is a species of damselfly in the family Platystictidae. It is endemic to Sri Lanka. It is named after the collector John Nietner.
