= Sinosticta =

Scientific classification
- Kingdom: Animalia
- Phylum: Arthropoda
- Clade: Pancrustacea
- Class: Insecta
- Order: Odonata
- Suborder: Zygoptera
- Family: Platystictidae
- Subfamily: Sinostictinae
- Genus: Sinosticta; Wilson, 1997

Genus of damselflies

Sinosticta is a genus of shadowdamsel in the damselfly family Platystictidae, and subfamily Sinostictinae. There are four described species in Sinosticta.

== Species ==
These four species belong to the genus Sinosticta:

- Sinosticta debra Wilson & Xu, 2007
- Sinosticta hainanense Wilson & Reels, 2001
- Sinosticta ogatai (Matsuki & Saito, 1996)
- Sinosticta sylvatica Yu & Bu, 2009
