= Sinostictinae =

Scientific classification
- Kingdom: Animalia
- Phylum: Arthropoda
- Clade: Pancrustacea
- Class: Insecta
- Order: Odonata
- Suborder: Zygoptera
- Family: Platystictidae
- Subfamily: Sinostictinae; Wilson, 1997

Genera
- Sinosticta; Yunnanosticta

Subfamily of damselflies

Sinostictinae is a subfamily of damselflies in the family Platystictidae. Its type genus is Sinosticta.
