= Genophantis iodora =

Scientific classification
- Kingdom: Animalia
- Phylum: Arthropoda
- Class: Insecta
- Order: Lepidoptera
- Family: Pyralidae
- Genus: Genophantis
- Species: G. iodora

Binomial name
- Genophantis iodora Meyrick, 1888

Species of moth

Genophantis iodora is a moth of the family Pyralidae described by Edward Meyrick in 1888. It is endemic to the Hawaiian islands of Kauai, Oahu, Molokai and Hawaii.

The wingspan is 22–27 mm.

The larvae feed on Euphorbia celastroides and Euphorbia clusiaefolia. They web together the leaves of their host plant.
