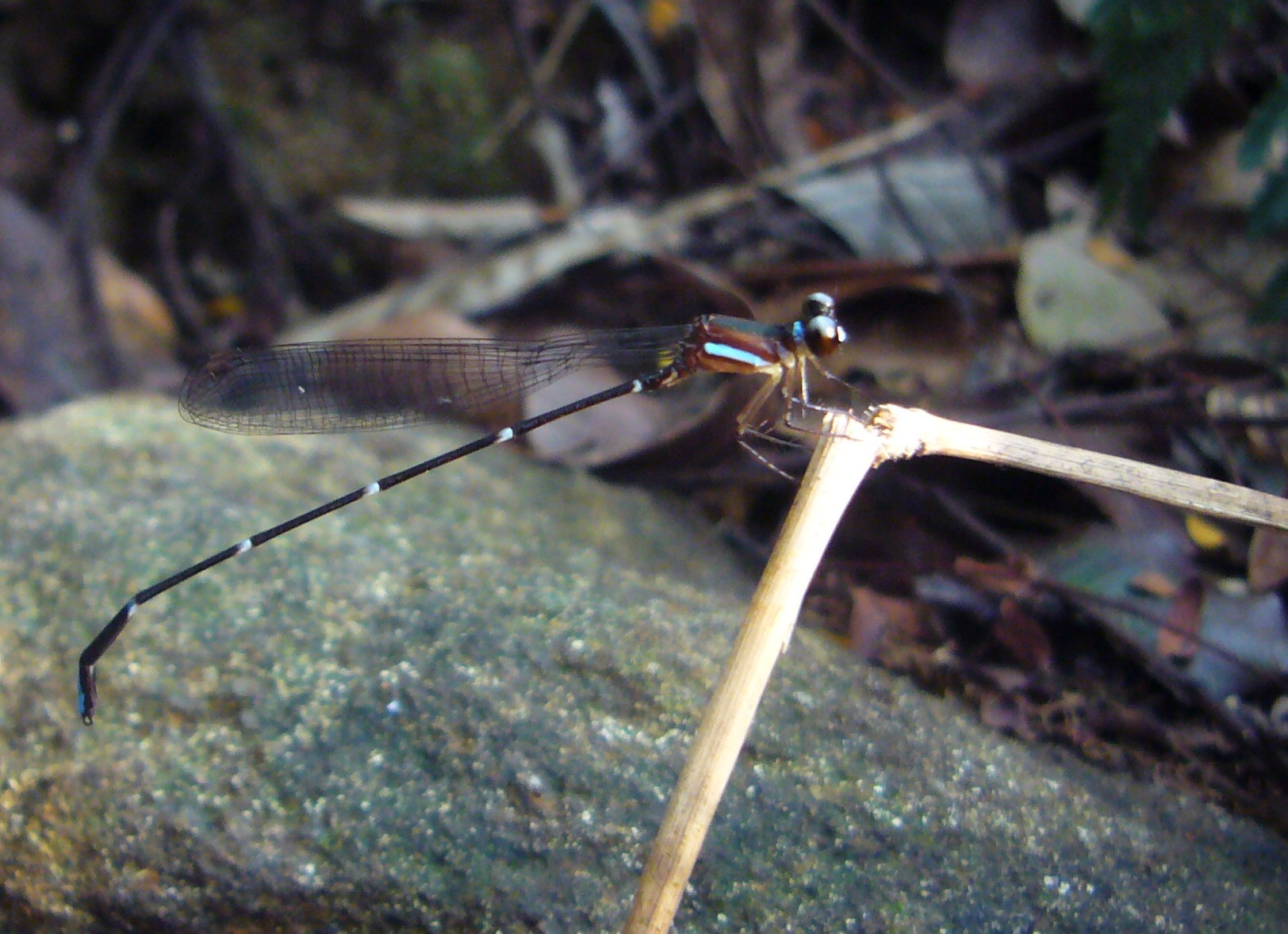

Conservation status
- Endangered (IUCN 3.1)

Scientific classification
- Kingdom: Animalia
- Phylum: Arthropoda
- Class: Insecta
- Order: Odonata
- Suborder: Zygoptera
- Family: Platystictidae
- Genus: Drepanosticta
- Species: D. walli

Binomial name
- Drepanosticta walli (Hagen in Selys, 1860)

Synonyms
- Ceylonosticta walli Fraser, 1931

= Drepanosticta walli =

Species of damselfly

Drepanosticta walli, or Wall's shadowdamsel, is a species of damselfly in the family Platystictidae. It is endemic to Sri Lanka.
