= Genophantis leahi =

Conservation status
- Extinct (IUCN 2.3)

Scientific classification
- Kingdom: Animalia
- Phylum: Arthropoda
- Class: Insecta
- Order: Lepidoptera
- Family: Pyralidae
- Genus: Genophantis
- Species: †G. leahi

Binomial name
- †Genophantis leahi Swezey, 1910

Species of moth

Genophantis leahi was a species of moth in the family Pyralidae described by Otto Herman Swezey in 1910. It was endemic to the Hawaiian islands of Maui, Oahu, Molokai and Hawaii.

== See also ==
- List of extinct animals of the Hawaiian Islands
- List of recently extinct insects

== Sources ==
- World Conservation Monitoring Centre (1996). "Genophantis leahi". IUCN Red List of Threatened Species. 1996 e.T9000A12948738. doi:10.2305/IUCN.UK.1996.RLTS.T9000A12948738.en.
- Zimmerman, Elwood C. (1958). Insects of Hawaii. Vol. 8 Lepidoptera: Pyraloidea. University of Hawaii Press. hdl:10125/7337.
