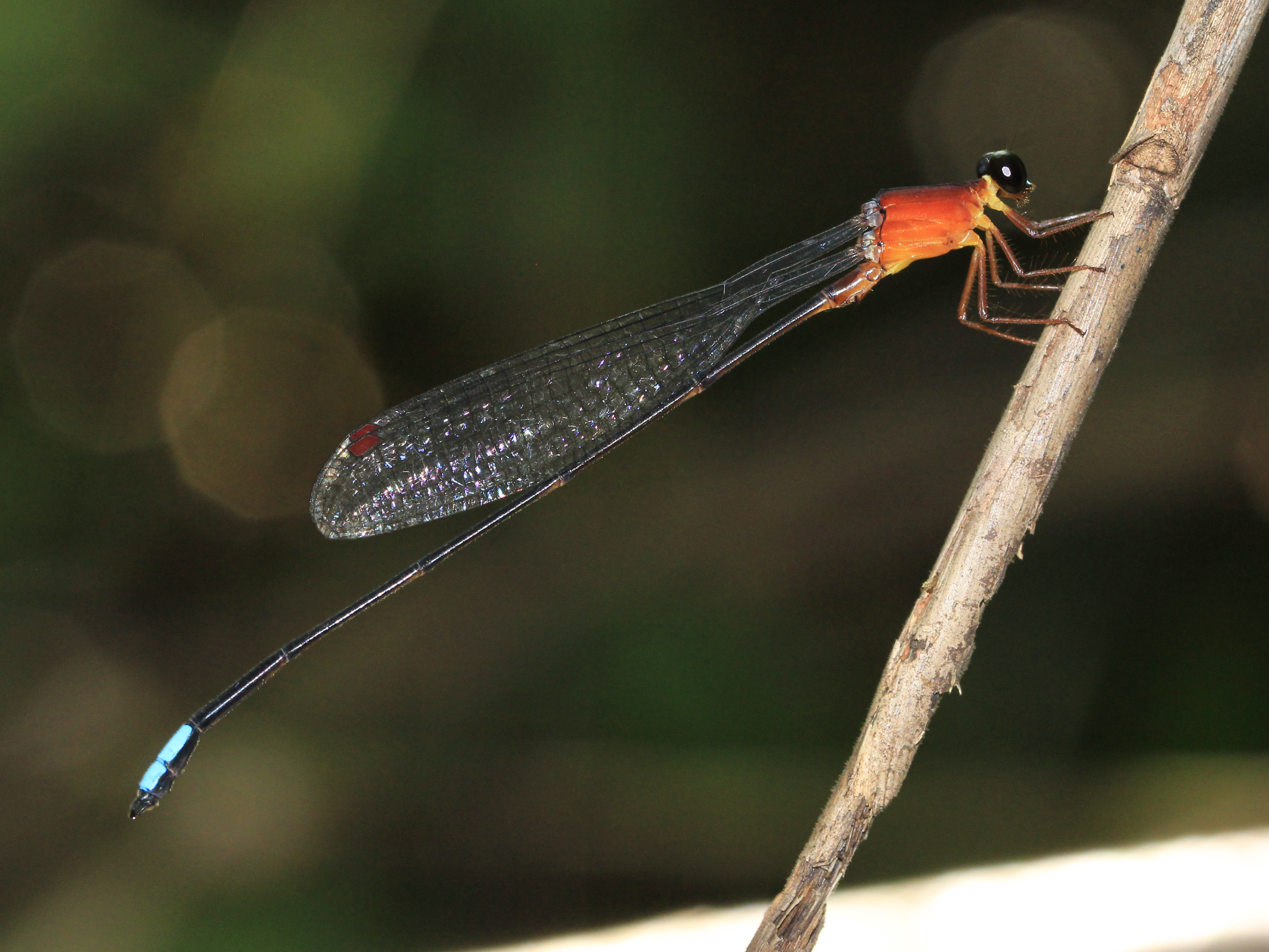
- Male
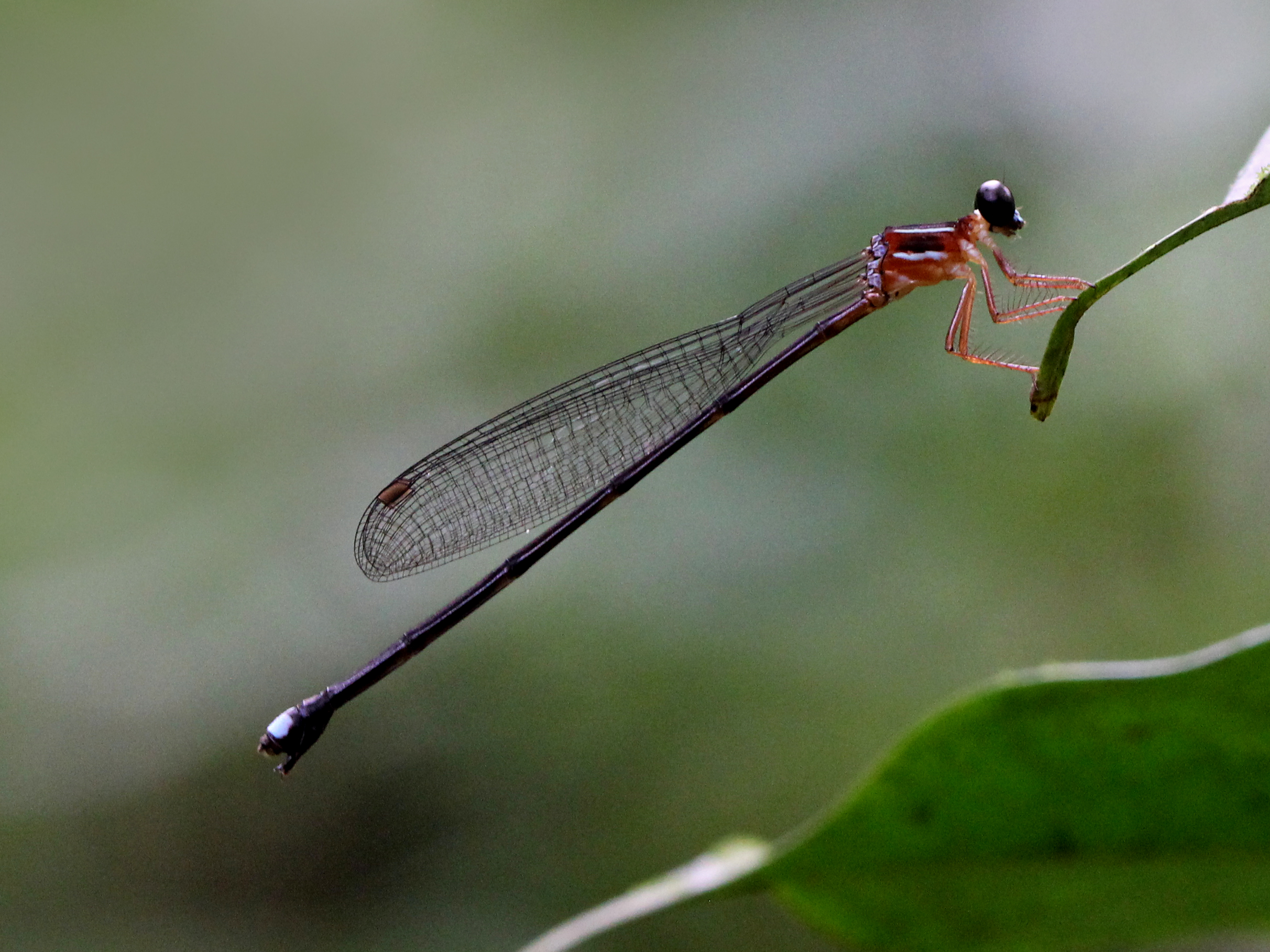
- Female

Conservation status
- Vulnerable (IUCN 3.1)

Scientific classification
- Kingdom: Animalia
- Phylum: Arthropoda
- Clade: Pancrustacea
- Class: Insecta
- Order: Odonata
- Suborder: Zygoptera
- Family: Platystictidae
- Genus: Indosticta; Bedjanic, 2016
- Species: I. deccanensis

Binomial name
- Indosticta deccanensis (Laidlaw, 1915)

Synonyms
- Platysticta deccanensis Laidlaw, 1915

= Indosticta =

Species of damselfly

Indosticta deccanensis, the saffron reedtail, is a damselfly species in the family Platystictidae. It is endemic to Western Ghats in India.

This species was previously placed in the genus Platysticta, but recent phylogenetic studies has revealed that the genus Platysticta is actually confined to Sri Lanka. For the South Indian species, formerly known as Platysticta deccanensis, morphological and molecular analyses demonstrated that it does not belong to the Sri Lankan clade and a new genus Indosticta is erected to accommodate it.

== Description and habitat ==
It is a medium-sized damselfly with bluish-white face and black-capped brown eyes. Its thorax is cinnamon brown with a black mid-dorsal carina. Its wings are transparent with yellowish-red pterostigma framed in black nervures. Abdomen is dark-brown up to segment 7 and segments 8 to 9 are azure blue bordered below with black. Segment 10 is blackish-brown. Anal appendages are black.

Female is similar to the male; but its thorax has a bit dark patches in the dorsum and the sides. There is a narrow ante-humeral pale blue stripe and another similar blue stripe bordering the black area of the mesepimeron. Abdomen is similar to the male; but segment 8 unmarked and segment 9 with a large oval pale blue dorso-lateral spot.

It is known to occur close to Myristica swamps and streams with dense riparian vegetation. Laidlaw described it from the Kingdom of Cochin. Recent studies have found populations of this species in Karnataka too. Commonly found resting on ferns in dark shady spots in forests.

== See also ==
- List of odonates of India
- List of odonata of Kerala
