= Triaenodes tridontus =

Conservation status
- Extinct (IUCN 2.3)

Scientific classification
- Kingdom: Animalia
- Phylum: Arthropoda
- Clade: Pancrustacea
- Class: Insecta
- Order: Trichoptera
- Family: Leptoceridae
- Genus: Triaenodes
- Species: †T. tridontus

Binomial name
- †Triaenodes tridontus Ross, 1938

Species of caddisfly

Triaenodes tridontus was a species of caddisfly in family Leptoceridae. It was endemic to the United States.
