= Ceylonosticta hilaris =

Conservation status
- Endangered (IUCN 3.1)

Scientific classification
- Kingdom: Animalia
- Phylum: Arthropoda
- Class: Insecta
- Order: Odonata
- Suborder: Zygoptera
- Family: Platystictidae
- Genus: Ceylonosticta
- Species: C. hilaris

Binomial name
- Ceylonosticta hilaris (Hagen, 1860)

Synonyms
- Agrion hilare Hagen, 1860; Drepanosticta hilaris (Hagen, 1860); Platysticta hilaris Hagen, 1860

Species of damselfly

Ceylonosticta hilaris, the merry shadowdamsel or cheerful forest damselfly, is a species of damselfly in the family Platystictidae. It is endemic to Sri Lanka. Its natural habitats are subtropical or tropical moist lowland forests and rivers. It is threatened by habitat loss.The species is listed as Endangered on the IUCN Red List due to habitat loss and its restricted range.

== Taxonomy ==
The species was first described by Hermann August Hagen in 1858. Over time, it has been placed in several genera before being assigned to its current placement in Ceylonosticta. Like other members of Platystictidae, it is part of a lineage of forest-dwelling damselflies largely restricted to South and Southeast Asia.

== Description ==
Ceylonosticta hilaris is a slender damselfly typical of the family Platystictidae. Adults have a narrow abdomen and relatively short wings that are held closed over the body when at rest. As with related species, identification relies on subtle morphological characters such as thoracic coloration, abdominal markings, and wing venation. Detailed diagnostic descriptions are available in classical odonatological literature, though modern redescriptions are limited.

== Distribution ==
The species is endemic to Sri Lanka, with confirmed records primarily from the central and southwestern parts of the island, including areas historically documented in the Nuwara Eliya and Ratnapura districts. Its distribution is highly localized and fragmented.

== Habitat ==
Ceylonosticta hilaris inhabits subtropical and tropical moist forest ecosystems, where it is associated with shaded, slow-flowing streams and forested riparian zones. These habitats are essential for both adult activity and larval development.

== Ecology and behavior ==
Adults are typically found in dense forest understory near streams, where they perch on low vegetation. Like other damselflies, they are predatory, feeding on small flying insects. The larval stage is aquatic and develops in clean, well-oxygenated forest streams. Specific details of its breeding behavior and life cycle remain poorly studied.

== Conservation status ==
The species is classified as Endangered by the IUCN. The main threats include deforestation, agricultural expansion, degradation of freshwater habitats, and fragmentation of forest cover. Because of its narrow ecological requirements and limited distribution, C. hilaris is considered particularly vulnerable to environmental change.

== Threats ==
Major threats affecting Ceylonosticta hilaris include:

- Loss of forest cover due to logging and land conversion
- Pollution and alteration of forest streams
- Decline in habitat quality within riparian zones
