= Kerr's noctuid moth =

Conservation status
- Critically Endangered (IUCN 3.1)

Scientific classification
- Kingdom: Animalia
- Phylum: Arthropoda
- Class: Insecta
- Order: Lepidoptera
- Superfamily: Noctuoidea
- Family: Noctuidae
- Genus: Agrotis
- Species: A. kerri

Binomial name
- Agrotis kerri Swezey, 1920
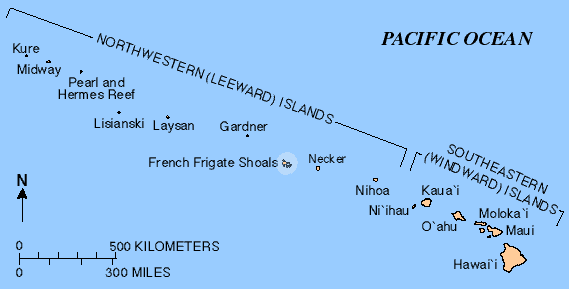
- Location of the French Frigate Shoals

Synonyms
- Euxoa kerri

Extinct species of moth

Kerr's noctuid moth (Agrotis kerri) is a species of moth in the family Noctuidae.

This moth is endemic to the French Frigate Shoals in the Northwestern Hawaiian Islands.
