= Trigonoscuta yorbalindae =

Conservation status
- Extinct (IUCN 3.1)

Scientific classification
- Kingdom: Animalia
- Phylum: Arthropoda
- Class: Insecta
- Order: Coleoptera
- Suborder: Polyphaga
- Infraorder: Cucujiformia
- Family: Curculionidae
- Genus: Trigonoscuta
- Species: †T. yorbalindae

Binomial name
- †Trigonoscuta yorbalindae Pierce, 1975

Species of beetle

Trigonoscuta yorbalindae was a species of beetle in family Curculionidae. It was endemic to the United States.
