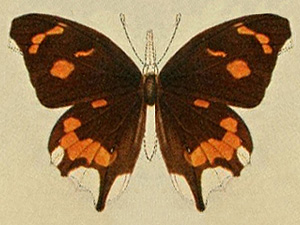

Conservation status
- Extinct (IUCN 2.3)

Scientific classification
- Kingdom: Animalia
- Phylum: Arthropoda
- Class: Insecta
- Order: Lepidoptera
- Family: Nymphalidae
- Genus: Libythea
- Species: †L. cinyras

Binomial name
- †Libythea cinyras Trimen, 1866

Synonyms
- Libythea labdaca cinyras

= Libythea cinyras =

Extinct species of butterfly

Libythea cinyras was a species of butterfly in the nymphalid subfamily Libytheinae. It is now thought to be extinct. It was endemic to Mauritius. The only known specimen is the holotype.
