= Agrotis crinigera =

Conservation status
- Critically endangered, possibly extinct (IUCN 3.1)

- Possibly Extinct (NatureServe)

Scientific classification
- Kingdom: Animalia
- Phylum: Arthropoda
- Clade: Pancrustacea
- Class: Insecta
- Order: Lepidoptera
- Superfamily: Noctuoidea
- Family: Noctuidae
- Genus: Agrotis
- Species: A. crinigera

Binomial name
- Agrotis crinigera (Butler, 1881)

Synonyms
- Spaelotis crinigera Butler, 1881

Species of moth

Agrotis crinigera is a species moth in the family Noctuidae. Endemic to the Hawaiian Islands, it has not been observed since 1926 and may be extinct. It is known as poko in Hawaiian and as the larger native cutworm in English.

In the late 1800s this species was reportedly abundant on the islands of Kauaʻi, Lānaʻi, Laysan, Hawaiʻi, Maui, Molokaʻi, and Oʻahu, though the population was reported to fluctuate significantly throughout the year. It was known to occur from sea level to elevations of up to 600 m (2,000 ft).

The larvae of A. crinigera were reported to feed on a range of native and non-native host plants. Native host plants include species of Vigna, Portulaca, and Sida, while non-native hosts include invasive Datura species and crop plants such as corn, legumes, peas, and sugarcane.

A. crinigera is listed as critically endangered (possibly extinct) on the IUCN Red List and as possibly extinct by NatureServe.
