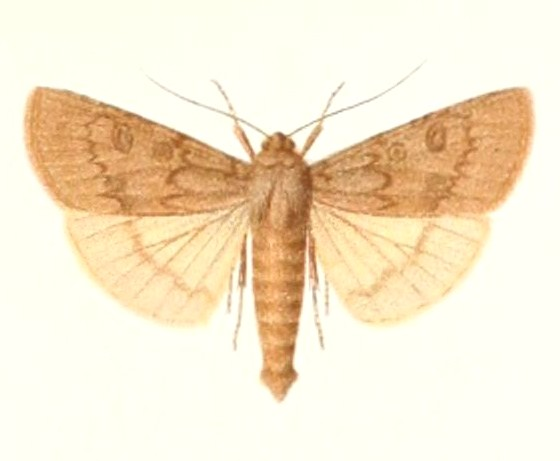

Conservation status
- Critically endangered, possibly extinct (IUCN 3.1)

Scientific classification
- Kingdom: Animalia
- Phylum: Arthropoda
- Class: Insecta
- Order: Lepidoptera
- Superfamily: Noctuoidea
- Family: Noctuidae
- Genus: Agrotis
- Species: A. fasciata

Binomial name
- Agrotis fasciata (Rothschild, 1894)
- Location of Midway Atoll

Synonyms
- Peridroma fasciata Rothschild, 1894

= Midway noctuid moth =

Species of moth

The Midway noctuid moth (Agrotis fasciata), also known as Midway mudworm, is a species of moth in the family Noctuidae. It is now possibly extinct and was endemic to Midway Atoll.
