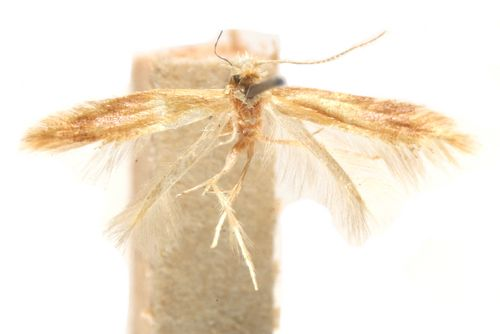
- Specimen from 1913.

Conservation status
- Extinct (IUCN 2.3)

Scientific classification
- Kingdom: Animalia
- Phylum: Arthropoda
- Clade: Pancrustacea
- Class: Insecta
- Order: Lepidoptera
- Family: Tischeriidae
- Genus: Coptotriche
- Species: †C. perplexa

Binomial name
- †Coptotriche perplexa (Braun, 1972)

Synonyms
- Tischeria perplexa Braun, 1972

= Chestnut clearwing moth =

Extinct species of moth

The chestnut clearwing moth (Coptotriche perplexa) was a species of moth in the family Tischeriidae. It was endemic to the United States. It is characterized by clear wings and a dark and metallic blue abdomen seemingly wrapped in a yellow band of color. By 1996 it had become extinct due to chestnut blight obliterating its primary food source, the American chestnut.
