= Minute noctuid moth =

Conservation status
- Extinct (IUCN 2.3)

Scientific classification
- Kingdom: Animalia
- Phylum: Arthropoda
- Class: Insecta
- Order: Lepidoptera
- Superfamily: Noctuoidea
- Family: Noctuidae
- Genus: Helicoverpa
- Species: †H. minuta

Binomial name
- †Helicoverpa minuta Hardwick, 1965

Extinct species of moth

The minute noctuid moth (Helicoverpa minuta) was a species of moth in the family Noctuidae.

It was endemic to the Hawaiian Islands.
