= Conozoa hyalina =

Conservation status
- Extinct (1977) (IUCN 2.3)

Scientific classification
- Kingdom: Animalia
- Phylum: Arthropoda
- Clade: Pancrustacea
- Class: Insecta
- Order: Orthoptera
- Suborder: Caelifera
- Family: Acrididae
- Genus: Conozoa
- Species: †C. hyalina

Binomial name
- †Conozoa hyalina (McNeil, 1901)

Extinct species of insect

Conozoa hyalina, the California Central Valley grasshopper or just Central Valley grasshopper, was a species of grasshopper in the family Acrididae, now extinct. It was endemic to the United States.
