= Kaholuamano noctuid moth =

Conservation status
- Extinct (IUCN 2.3)

Scientific classification
- Kingdom: Animalia
- Phylum: Arthropoda
- Class: Insecta
- Order: Lepidoptera
- Superfamily: Noctuoidea
- Family: Erebidae
- Genus: Hypena
- Species: †H. senicula

Binomial name
- †Hypena senicula (Meyrick, 1928)

Synonyms
- Nesamiptis senicula Meyrick, 1928

Extinct species of moth

The Kaholuamano noctuid moth (Hypena senicula) is an extinct moth belonging to the family Erebidae. The species was first described by Edward Meyrick in 1928. It was endemic to the Hawaiian island of Kauaʻi, but is now considered extinct.
