= Megachile cypricola =

Conservation status
- Critically Endangered (IUCN 3.1)

Scientific classification
- Kingdom: Animalia
- Phylum: Arthropoda
- Class: Insecta
- Order: Hymenoptera
- Family: Megachilidae
- Genus: Megachile
- Species: M. cypricola

Binomial name
- Megachile cypricola Mavromoustakis, 1938

Species of leafcutter bee (Megachile)

Megachile cypricola is a species of bee in the family Megachilidae native to Cyprus. It was described by Mavromoustakis in 1938.

== Conservation status ==
This species had not been observed since 1950, and was thought to perhaps be extinct, until research performed to update a list of the bees present in Cyprus found local populations of the bee. Later research revealed that while the species is rare on an island-level, it is relatively abundant locally.

== Ecology ==
All specimens collected during the re-discovery of the species were found on a native plant species, Onobrychis venosa.
