= Tritocleis =

ʻOlaʻa peppered looper moth

Conservation status
- Extinct (IUCN 2.3)

Scientific classification
- Kingdom: Animalia
- Phylum: Arthropoda
- Class: Insecta
- Order: Lepidoptera
- Family: Geometridae
- Genus: †Tritocleis; Meyrick, 1899
- Species: †T. microphylla

Binomial name
- †Tritocleis microphylla Meyrick, 1899

Single-species extinct genus of moths

Tritocleis is monotypic moth genus in the family Geometridae described by Edward Meyrick in 1899. Its only species, Tritocleis microphylla, the ʻOlaʻa peppered looper moth, described by the same author in the same year, is now extinct.

It was endemic to the Hawaiian Islands.

The wingspan was about 20 mm.
