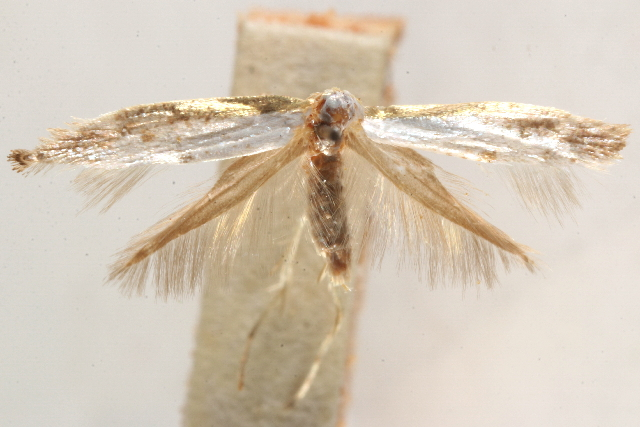

Conservation status
- Extinct (IUCN 2.3)

- Possibly Extinct (NatureServe)

Scientific classification
- Kingdom: Animalia
- Phylum: Arthropoda
- Clade: Pancrustacea
- Class: Insecta
- Order: Lepidoptera
- Family: Argyresthiidae
- Genus: Argyresthia
- Species: †A. castaneella

Binomial name
- †Argyresthia castaneella Busck, 1915

Synonyms
- Argyresthia castaneela (lapsus)

= Chestnut ermine moth =

Extinct species of moth

The chestnut ermine moth (Argyresthia castaneella) is an extinct species of moth in the subfamily Argyresthiinae. It was endemic to the United States. The species was only seen in two states, New Hampshire and Vermont. It became extinct due to chestnut blight obliterating its primary food source, the American chestnut.
