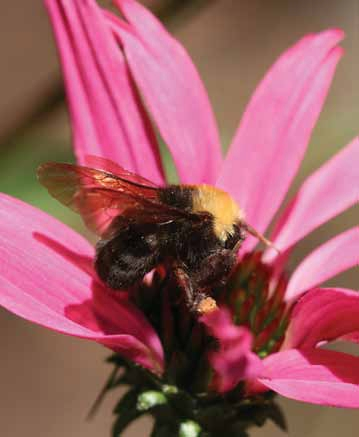

Conservation status
- Critically Endangered (IUCN 3.1)

- Critically Imperiled (NatureServe)

Scientific classification
- Kingdom: Animalia
- Phylum: Arthropoda
- Class: Insecta
- Order: Hymenoptera
- Family: Apidae
- Genus: Bombus
- Subgenus: Bombus
- Species: B. franklini

Binomial name
- Bombus franklini (Frison, 1921)

= Franklin's bumblebee =

Species of bee

Franklin's bumblebee (Bombus franklini) is one of the most narrowly distributed bumblebee species, making it a critically endangered bee in the western United States. It lives only in a 190-by-70-mile (310 by 110 km) area in southern Oregon and northern California, between the Coast and Sierra-Cascade mountain ranges. It was last seen in 2006. Franklin's bumblebee is a generalist forager which collects nectar and pollen from several wildflowers, such as lupine, California poppy, and horsemint.

== Description ==
Franklin's bumblebee is distinguished from other bumblebees by a solid black abdomen, with a yellow U-shaped pattern on the anterior thorax. Females have black hair on their faces and the vertices, with some light hairs mixed above and below their antennal bases, whereas most similar bumblebee species have yellow. Males of this species are similar except their malar spaces are as long as they are wide, the hair on their faces is yellow, and tergum 6 has some pale hairs laterally.

== Conservation ==
The population of this bumblebee species has decreased drastically since 1998, with last sighting in Oregon, in 2006. Some experts, such as professor Dave Goulson at the University of Sussex, say this species is already extinct, but until more concrete evidence is shown, it has been assigned a conservation status rank of G1 (critically imperiled) by NatureServe, and categorized as critically endangered by the IUCN Red List.

A petition was submitted by the Xerces Society, Defenders of Wildlife, and the Center for Food Safety to the California Fish and Game Commission in October 2018 to list Bombus franklini and three others as endangered under the California Endangered Species Act.

The California Department of Fish and Wildlife evaluated this petition in a report for the California Fish and Game Commission completed in April 2019. On June 12, 2019, the California Fish and Game Commission voted to add all four bumblebees, including Bombus franklini, to the list of protected species under the California Endangered Species Act. A subsequent legal challenge of the CESA's definition of a fish as "a wild fish, mollusk, crustacean, invertebrate, amphibian, or part, spawn, or ovum of any of those animals" was eventually overruled, because the explicit intent was for all invertebrates (therefore including insects) to be qualified for protection under this legal definition.
