= Agrotis photophila =

Light-loving noctuid moth

Conservation status
- Critically endangered, possibly extinct (IUCN 3.1)

Scientific classification
- Kingdom: Animalia
- Phylum: Arthropoda
- Clade: Pancrustacea
- Class: Insecta
- Order: Lepidoptera
- Superfamily: Noctuoidea
- Family: Noctuidae
- Genus: Agrotis
- Species: A. photophila

Binomial name
- Agrotis photophila (Butler, 1879)
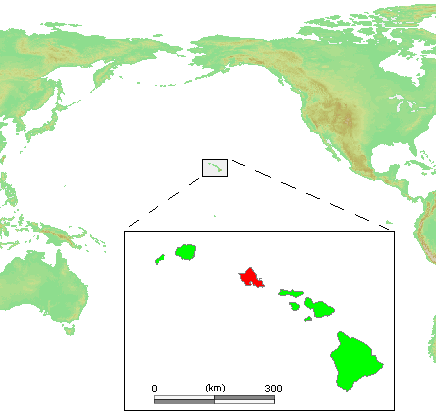
- Location of Oʻahu

Synonyms
- Agrotis lucicolens (Butler, 1880); Euxoa photophila (Butler, 1879); Leucania photophila Butler, 1879; Spaelotis lucicolens Butler, 1880

Species of moth

Agrotis photophila, the light-loving noctuid moth, is a species of moth in the family Noctuidae. It is endemic to Oʻahu, Hawaiʻi, United States.

This moth was last reported around 1900. Two dead specimens are preserved in the British Museum. These had been collected near Honolulu in the 19th century. At that time the species was already rare.

These dead specimens have been described thus:

35—40 mm. Antennae in ,? bidentate with long triangular processes. Forewings light greyish-ochreous sprinkled with fuscous; subbasal, first, and second lines indicated by more or less distinct blackish dots, first and second sometimes forming undefined waved lines; posterior edge of reniform sometimes indicated by black scales; traces of a darker praesubterminal shade; a terminal series of dark fuscous dots. Hindwings light greyish-ochreous, posteriorly infuscated.
