= Hygrotus artus =

Scientific classification
- Domain: Eukaryota
- Kingdom: Animalia
- Phylum: Arthropoda
- Class: Insecta
- Order: Coleoptera
- Suborder: Adephaga
- Family: Dytiscidae
- Genus: Hygrotus
- Species: H. artus

Binomial name
- Hygrotus artus Fall, 1919

Species of beetle

Hygrotus artus is a species of beetle in the family Dytiscidae. It is known to only occur in Inyo and Mono counties, California, United States. Its common name is the Mono Lake diving beetle.

It was previously thought to be extinct, but recent work has shown that it is neither "extinct nor living in the alkaline Mono Lake."
