= Rhantus papuanus =

Conservation status
- Extinct (IUCN 2.3)

Scientific classification
- Kingdom: Animalia
- Phylum: Arthropoda
- Class: Insecta
- Order: Coleoptera
- Suborder: Adephaga
- Family: Dytiscidae
- Genus: Rhantus
- Species: †R. papuanus

Binomial name
- †Rhantus papuanus Balfour-Browne, 1939

Species of beetle

Rhantus papuanus was a species of beetle in family Dytiscidae. It was endemic to Papua New Guinea.
