= Phleophagan chestnut moth =

Conservation status
- Extinct (IUCN 3.1)

Scientific classification
- Kingdom: Animalia
- Phylum: Arthropoda
- Clade: Pancrustacea
- Class: Insecta
- Order: Lepidoptera
- Family: Nepticulidae
- Genus: Ectoedemia
- Species: †E. phleophaga

Binomial name
- †Ectoedemia phleophaga Busck, 1914

Species of moth

The phleophagan chestnut moth (Ectoedemia phleophaga) was a species of moth in the Nepticulidae family. It was endemic to the United States, where it was known from Virginia.

The wingspan is 9–10 mm. Adults were on wing during September.
