= Agrotis procellaris =

Conservation status
- Critically Endangered (IUCN 3.1)

Scientific classification
- Kingdom: Animalia
- Phylum: Arthropoda
- Clade: Pancrustacea
- Class: Insecta
- Order: Lepidoptera
- Superfamily: Noctuoidea
- Family: Noctuidae
- Genus: Agrotis
- Species: A. procellaris

Binomial name
- Agrotis procellaris Meyrick 1900
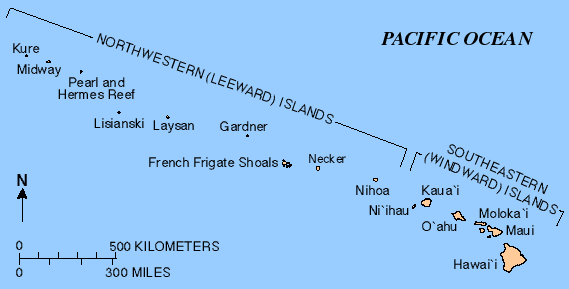
- Laysan in relation to the Northwestern Hawaiian Islands

Synonyms
- Euxoa procellaris

Species of moth

Agrotis procellaris is a species of moth in the family Noctuidae.

This moth is endemic to Laysan Island, in the Northwestern Hawaiian Islands.
