= Confused moth =

Conservation status
- Extinct (IUCN 2.3)

Scientific classification
- Kingdom: Animalia
- Phylum: Arthropoda
- Class: Insecta
- Order: Lepidoptera
- Superfamily: Noctuoidea
- Family: Noctuidae
- Genus: Helicoverpa
- Species: †H. confusa

Binomial name
- †Helicoverpa confusa Hardwick, 1965

Extinct species of moth

The confused moth (Helicoverpa confusa) is an extinct species of moth in the family Noctuidae.

It was endemic to Hawaii.

== Extinction ==
The IUCN lists the Confused moth as extinct. But, some sources say that it was rediscovered in 1997.

== Sources ==
- IUCN Red List of all current threatened species
