= Megalagrion jugorum =

Conservation status
- Critically endangered, possibly extinct (IUCN 3.1)

Scientific classification
- Kingdom: Animalia
- Phylum: Arthropoda
- Class: Insecta
- Order: Odonata
- Suborder: Zygoptera
- Family: Coenagrionidae
- Genus: Megalagrion
- Species: M. jugorum

Binomial name
- Megalagrion jugorum (Perkins, 1899)

Species of damselfly

Megalagrion jugorum (common name Maui Upland Damselfly) is a possibly extinct species of damselfly in the family Coenagrionidae that is endemic to the island of Maui in Hawaii.
