= Hydropsyche tobiasi =

Conservation status
- Extinct (1938) (IUCN 3.1)

Scientific classification
- Kingdom: Animalia
- Phylum: Arthropoda
- Clade: Pancrustacea
- Class: Insecta
- Order: Trichoptera
- Family: Hydropsychidae
- Genus: Hydropsyche
- Species: †H. tobiasi

Binomial name
- †Hydropsyche tobiasi Malicky, 1977

Extinct species of caddisfly

Hydropsyche tobiasi, or Tobias' caddisfly, is an extinct species of caddisfly which lived on the River Rhine between Mainz and Cologne.

== History ==
It was last seen in 1938 and was described in 1977 by Austrian entomologist Hans Malicky on the basis of material he found in earlier collections. Very little is known about the species and no larvae were ever found. The River Rhine has been a subject to urban and industrial pollution for several decades during the 20th century. This had led to the decline and disappearance of many caddisfly species on several riversides of the Rhine.
