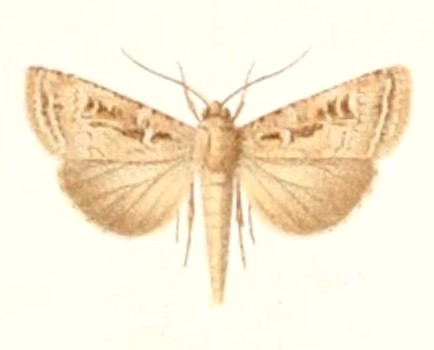

Conservation status
- Critically Endangered (IUCN 3.1)

Scientific classification
- Kingdom: Animalia
- Phylum: Arthropoda
- Class: Insecta
- Order: Lepidoptera
- Superfamily: Noctuoidea
- Family: Noctuidae
- Genus: Agrotis
- Species: A. laysanensis

Binomial name
- Agrotis laysanensis (Rothschild, 1894)
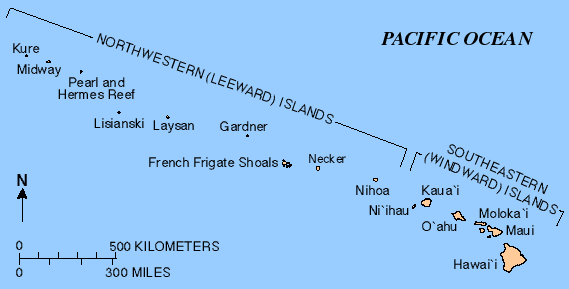
- Laysan in relation to the Northwestern Hawaiian Islands

Synonyms
- Prodenia laysanensis Rothschild, 1894

= Laysan noctuid moth =

Extinct species of moth

The Laysan noctuid moth (Agrotis laysanensis) is a species of moth in the family Noctuidae.

It is endemic to Laysan, in the Northwestern Hawaiian Islands.

This moth was one, if not the main species, eaten by the extinct Laysan millerbird. Agrotis moths are commonly known as "millers", and the bird was named after its favorite food.
