= Mecodema punctellum =

Conservation status
- Extinct (IUCN 3.1)

Scientific classification
- Kingdom: Animalia
- Phylum: Arthropoda
- Clade: Pancrustacea
- Class: Insecta
- Order: Coleoptera
- Suborder: Adephaga
- Family: Carabidae
- Genus: Mecodema
- Species: †M. punctellum

Binomial name
- †Mecodema punctellum Broun, 1921

Species of beetle

Mecodema punctellum is a presumed-extinct species of ground beetle of the family Carabidae, endemic to Stephens Island in New Zealand.

== Description ==
Mecodema punctellum was a large black flightless ground beetle which reached a length of 38.5 millimetres (1.52 in) and a width of 11.7 millimetres (0.46 in).

== Habitat and biology ==
Nothing is known about its habitat, but it is assumed that it occurred in wet forests and sought shelter under large logs. It was a predator of snails.

== Extinction ==
Mecodema punctellum was last seen in 1931, and after surveys in 1961, 1971, 1974/5, 1976, 1981, 1990, 1996 on Stephens Island, and 1997 on D'Urville Island failed, it is now considered to be extinct. The cause of its extinction was probably habitat destruction, because after the clearing of forest there were no large logs remaining on Stephens Island.

== References and external links ==
- Fauna of New Zealand Series: Mecodema punctellum
- Britton (1949) description and Image of Mecodema punctellum
