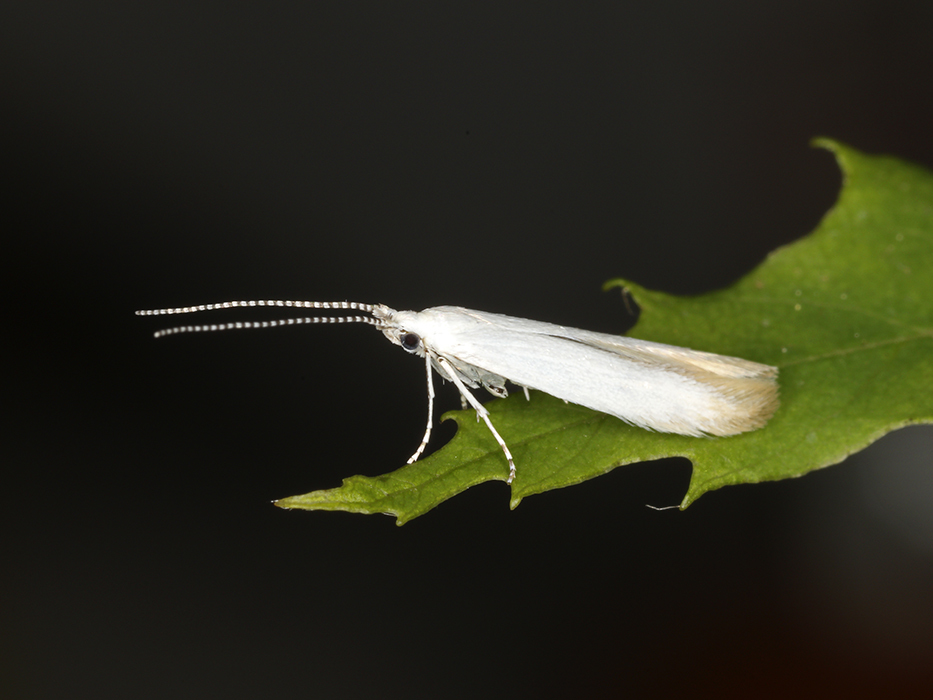

Scientific classification
- Kingdom: Animalia
- Phylum: Arthropoda
- Clade: Pancrustacea
- Class: Insecta
- Order: Lepidoptera
- Family: Coleophoridae
- Genus: Coleophora
- Species: C. leucochrysella

Binomial name
- Coleophora leucochrysella Clemens, 1863

= Coleophora leucochrysella =

Chestnut Casebearer Moth

Species of moth

The chestnut casebearer moth (Coleophora leucochrysella) is a species of moth in the family Coleophoridae. It is endemic to the United States, where it is found in Indiana, Massachusetts, Pennsylvania, and Virginia. It is a highly specialized species, its larvae feed specifically on the leaves of the American Chestnut. It was thought the species became extinct when many American chestnut trees died due to an infection of the fungus Cryphonectria parasitica, which was accidentally introduced from Asia around 1900. However, this species was rediscovered.

== Rediscovery ==
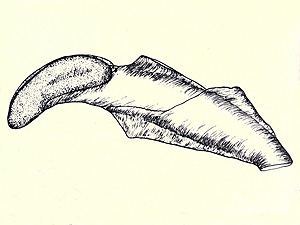
Larval case depicted by William T. M. Forbes (1920).

In June 2020, larval cases were found in Northfield, Massachusetts by Charley Eiseman. When it was searched for elsewhere, it was also found, including larval cases and living moths. The IUCN Red List of Threatened Species has not yet updated its conservation status from extinct.

== Sources ==
- World Conservation Monitoring Centre (1996). "Coleophora leucochrysella". IUCN Red List of Threatened Species. 1996 e.T5111A11115175. doi:10.2305/IUCN.UK.1996.RLTS.T5111A11115175.en.
