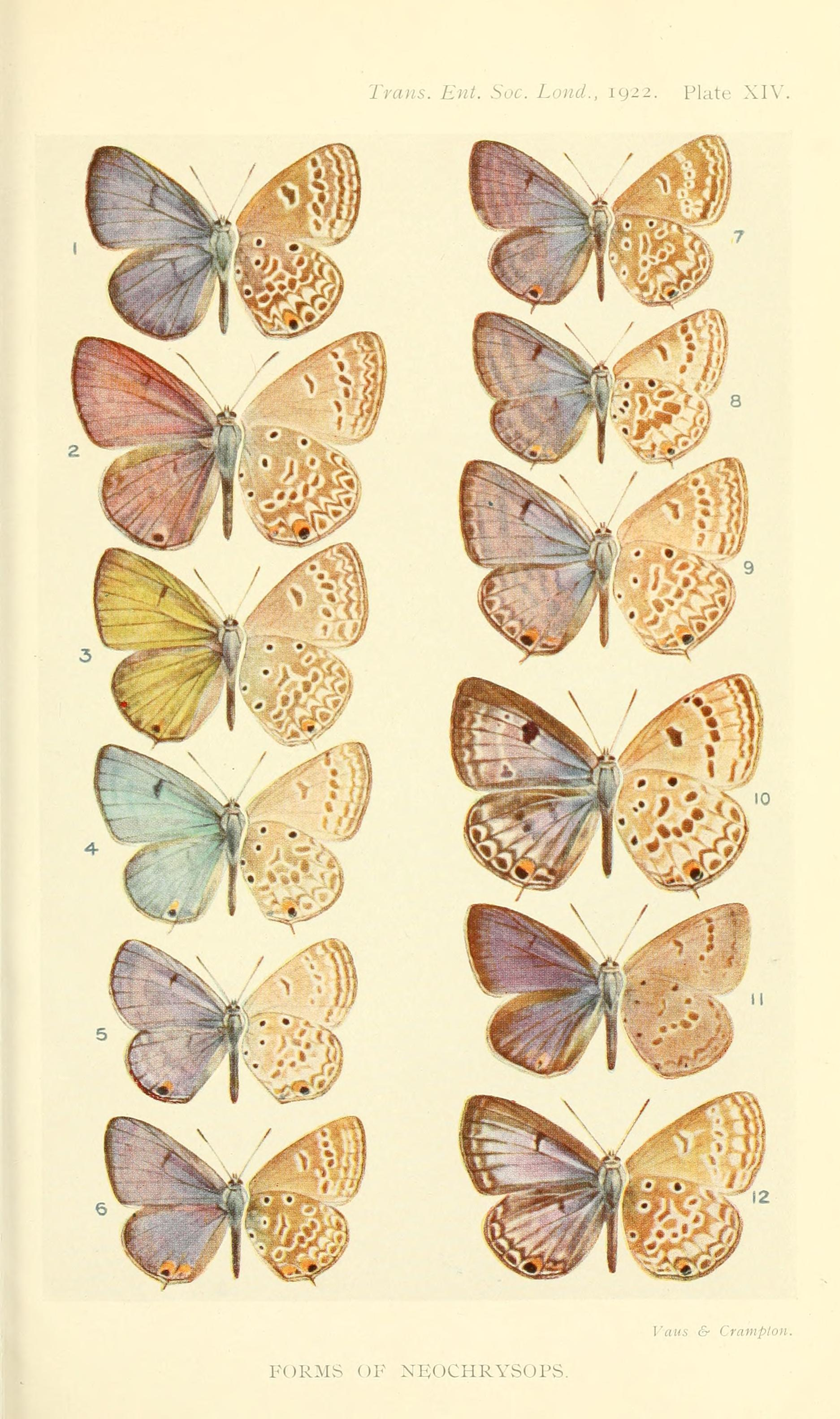
- figure 11

Conservation status
- Extinct (IUCN 3.1)

Scientific classification
- Kingdom: Animalia
- Phylum: Arthropoda
- Class: Insecta
- Order: Lepidoptera
- Family: Lycaenidae
- Genus: Lepidochrysops
- Species: †L. hypopolia

Binomial name
- †Lepidochrysops hypopolia (Trimen & Bowker, 1887)

Synonyms
- Lycaena hypopolia Trimen & Bowker, 1887; Cupido hypopolia; Neochrysops hypopolia

= Lepidochrysops hypopolia =

Extinct species of butterfly

Lepidochrysops hypopolia, the Morant's blue (Afrikaans: Morant-bloutjie), is an extinct species of butterfly in the family Lycaenidae. It was endemic to South Africa. The species is only known from two complete male specimens, and one partial male specimen (a leg). The species is named after Walter Morant, who caught the two complete male specimens.

The complete specimens were both caught in Blue Bank, near Ladysmith, KwaZulu-Natal on 21 September 1870 by Morant. The partial specimen was discovered by Thomas Ayres near Potchefstroom, North West Province (South Africa) in 1879.

This species was listed as extinct in S. F. Henning & G. A. Henning (1989) and G. A. Henning and S. F. Henning (1992b).

Morant's complete specimens are on display at Natural History Museum, London. Ayres' partial specimen is on display in the South African Museum, Cape Town.

== Habitat ==
Proposed habitats for this species are KwaZulu-Natal Highland Thornveld (Sub-Escarpment Grassland Bioregion) and Carletonville Dolomite Grassland (Dry Highvield Grassland Bioregion) in the Grassland Biome Unit. Exact localities are unknown.

Reports of a single putative female specimen, supposedly collected by C. W. Morrison near Estcourt, KwaZulu-Natal are unconfirmed.

== Rationale ==
There have been no verified specimens since 1879. The undersurfaces of the complete specimens are lighter and more hoary than the closely related (probable sister species) Lepidochrysops praeterita.

It has been speculated that the three known specimens were possibly chemically bleached examples of Lepidochrysops praeterita. If this is the case, then the two taxa are conspecific. However, the upper surfaces are not bleached, and the outer margins of the forewings of the male specimens are more convex than in Lepidochrysops praeterita.
