= Lovegrass noctuid moth =

Conservation status
- Extinct (IUCN 2.3)

Scientific classification
- Kingdom: Animalia
- Phylum: Arthropoda
- Class: Insecta
- Order: Lepidoptera
- Superfamily: Noctuoidea
- Family: Erebidae
- Genus: Hypena
- Species: †H. plagiota

Binomial name
- †Hypena plagiota (Meyrick, 1899)

Synonyms
- Nesamiptis plagiota Meyrick, 1899; Nesamiptis proterortha Meyrick, 1928

Species of moth

The lovegrass noctuid moth (Hypena plagiota) was a moth in the family Erebidae. The species was first described by Edward Meyrick in 1899. It was endemic to Kauaʻi, Oʻahu, and Maui but is now considered extinct.

Larvae have been recorded feeding on Eragrostis species.
