= Hilo noctuid moth =

Conservation status
- Extinct (IUCN 2.3)

Scientific classification
- Kingdom: Animalia
- Phylum: Arthropoda
- Class: Insecta
- Order: Lepidoptera
- Superfamily: Noctuoidea
- Family: Erebidae
- Genus: Hypena
- Species: †H. newelli

Binomial name
- †Hypena newelli (Swezey, 1912)

Synonyms
- Nesamiptis newelli Swezey, 1912

Species of moth

The Hilo noctuid moth (Hypena newelli) was a moth in the family Erebidae. The species was first described by Otto Herman Swezey in 1912. It was endemic to the island of Hawaii and is now extinct.
