= Neduba extincta =

Conservation status
- Extinct (IUCN 2.3)

- Presumed Extinct (NatureServe)

Scientific classification
- Kingdom: Animalia
- Phylum: Arthropoda
- Class: Insecta
- Order: Orthoptera
- Suborder: Ensifera
- Family: Tettigoniidae
- Genus: Neduba
- Species: †N. extincta

Binomial name
- †Neduba extincta Rentz, 1977

Extinct species of cricket-like animal

Neduba extincta, the Antioch Dunes shieldback katydid, is an extinct species of katydid (family Tettigoniidae) that was endemic to California, United States. It was not discovered until after its extinction.

== Description ==
The Antioch Dunes shield-back katydid is an orthopteran within the family Tettigoniidae (katydids and long-horned grasshoppers). It is considered large for a katydid species. Like all orthopterans, it has powerful hind legs that it uses for jumping and that help it to evade or confuse predators. Both the fore and hind legs are covered in small spines. The pronotum covers only the first tergite of the abdominal region. Connected at the base of the head, the pronotum lifts slightly off the body, hence the "shield-back". The abdomen has ten tergites or sections. They are light brown, with black mottling on the legs and antennae.

== Discovery ==
There is no record of when the initial specimen was found. Neduba extincta was captured but never fully described. In the 1960s, Dave Rentz found an example of the species in a specimen drawer, however it was not identified or detailed. Rentz noted the unique morphology of its genitalia and the size of the specimen. In his research, he traveled to the Antioch Sand Dunes in California, where the specimen was originally collected, but he found no other living specimens. It took several years of researching until he was finally able to identify the species as Neduba extincta. The Antioch Sand Dunes, the original environment of the Antioch Dunes shield-back katydid, once bordered the Mojave Desert. It is said that in prehistorical times climate alterations separated the dunes from the Mojave, thus isolating species living on the dunes. For this reason, these species' survival was contingent on the uninterrupted ecology of the dunes. As the development of the Western United States began, the dune dwellers such as Neduba extincta declined in population and in this specific case were driven to extinction.

== Location ==
The Antioch Dunes shield-back katydid was found in Antioch, California. It is described in the Antioch Sand Dunes, which formerly occupied a considerable acreage along the Sacramento-San Joaquin Rivers, but which are now restricted to a small, highly disturbed area under the threat of complete destruction.

== Behavior ==
The Antioch Dunes shield-back katydid's diet included flowers, leaves, small insects, and fungi.

== Extinction ==
The extinction of the Antioch Dunes shield-back katydid was due to the industrialization of California. When Europeans started moving into California, Neduba extincta were driven to the Antioch Dunes where they resided until their extinction, recorded to have been around 1996. There were approximately eight different species of insects that were endemic to the Antioch Dunes, three of which are now extinct. The other five are on the list of endangered species.

== Sources ==
- Eaton, Joe. "To Protect Invertebrates!" The Xerces Society » Column: Wild Neighbors: Antioch Dunes. The Berkeley Daily Planet, 1 Apr. 2008. Web. 22 Oct. 2014.
