= Rhantus novacaledoniae =

Conservation status
- Extinct (IUCN 2.3)

Scientific classification
- Kingdom: Animalia
- Phylum: Arthropoda
- Clade: Pancrustacea
- Class: Insecta
- Order: Coleoptera
- Suborder: Adephaga
- Family: Dytiscidae
- Genus: Rhantus
- Species: †R. novacaledoniae

Binomial name
- †Rhantus novacaledoniae Balfour-Browne, 1944

Species of beetle

Rhantus novacaledoniae is a now extinct species of beetle in the family Dytiscidae. It was endemic to New Caledonia.
