= Phyllococcus =

Conservation status
- Extinct (IUCN 3.1)

Scientific classification
- Kingdom: Animalia
- Phylum: Arthropoda
- Class: Insecta
- Order: Hemiptera
- Suborder: Sternorrhyncha
- Family: Pseudococcidae
- Genus: †Phyllococcus
- Species: †P. oahuensis

Binomial name
- †Phyllococcus oahuensis (Ehrhorn, 1912)

Synonyms
- Cissococcus oahuensis Ehrhorn, 1912

Genus of true bugs

Phyllococcus oahuensis is an extinct species of mealybug in the family Pseudococcidae, and the only species in the genus Phyllococcus. It was endemic to Hawaii.
