= Heliogomphus nietneri =

Conservation status
- Endangered (IUCN 3.1)

Scientific classification
- Kingdom: Animalia
- Phylum: Arthropoda
- Clade: Pancrustacea
- Class: Insecta
- Order: Odonata
- Suborder: Anisoptera
- Family: Gomphidae
- Genus: Heliogomphus
- Species: H. nietneri

Binomial name
- Heliogomphus nietneri (Selys, 1878)

Species of dragonfly

Heliogomphus nietneri is a species of dragonfly in the family Gomphidae. It is endemic to Sri Lanka. Its natural habitats are subtropical or tropical moist lowland forests and rivers. It is threatened by habitat loss.
