= Megalagrion molokaiense =

Conservation status
- Critically endangered, possibly extinct (IUCN 3.1)

Scientific classification
- Kingdom: Animalia
- Phylum: Arthropoda
- Class: Insecta
- Order: Odonata
- Suborder: Zygoptera
- Family: Coenagrionidae
- Genus: Megalagrion
- Species: M. molokaiense

Binomial name
- Megalagrion molokaiense (Perkins, 1899)

Species of damselfly

Megalagrion molokaiense, common name Molokai damselfly, is a species of damselfly in the family Coenagrionidae. It is endemic to Hawaii. Its natural habitat is subtropical or tropical moist montane forests. It is thought that it breeds on dripping wet embankments or in small streams in habitats that lack gambusia.
