= Enallagma maldivensis =

Conservation status
- Data Deficient (IUCN 3.1)

Scientific classification
- Kingdom: Animalia
- Phylum: Arthropoda
- Class: Insecta
- Order: Odonata
- Suborder: Zygoptera
- Family: Coenagrionidae
- Genus: Enallagma
- Species: E. maldivensis

Binomial name
- Enallagma maldivensis Laidlaw, 1902

Species of damselfly

Enallagma maldivensis is a species of damselfly in family Coenagrionidae. It is endemic to Maldives.
