= Eupropacris abbreviata =

Conservation status
- Critically endangered, possibly extinct (IUCN 3.1)

Scientific classification
- Domain: Eukaryota
- Kingdom: Animalia
- Phylum: Arthropoda
- Class: Insecta
- Order: Orthoptera
- Suborder: Caelifera
- Family: Acrididae
- Genus: Eupropacris
- Species: E. abbreviata

Binomial name
- Eupropacris abbreviata (Miller, 1929)

Species of grasshopper

Eupropacris abbreviata, commonly known as the Kilosa noble grasshopper, is a species of grasshopper of the family Acrididae. The species is endemic to Kilosa in Tanzania. It has not been seen since 1926 and it is considered critically endangered, possibly extinct, by the IUCN; the main threat is deforestation.
