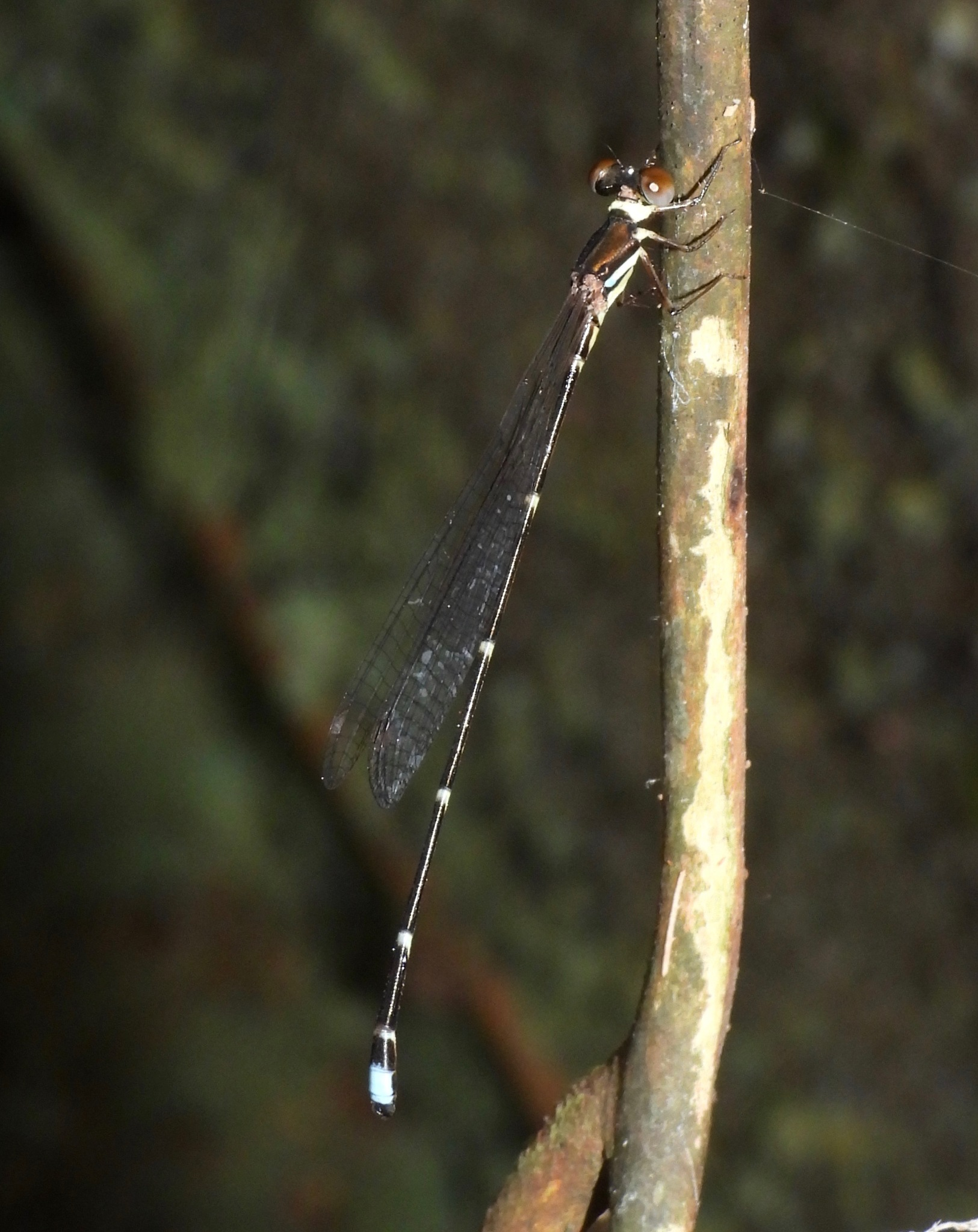

Conservation status
- Endangered (IUCN 3.1)

Scientific classification
- Kingdom: Animalia
- Phylum: Arthropoda
- Class: Insecta
- Order: Odonata
- Suborder: Zygoptera
- Family: Platystictidae
- Genus: Drepanosticta
- Species: D. adami

Binomial name
- Drepanosticta adami (Fraser, 1933)

= Drepanosticta adami =

Species of damselfly

Drepanosticta adami is a species of damselfly in the family Platystictidae. It is endemic to Sri Lanka. Its natural habitats are subtropical or tropical moist lowland forests and rivers. It is threatened by habitat loss.
