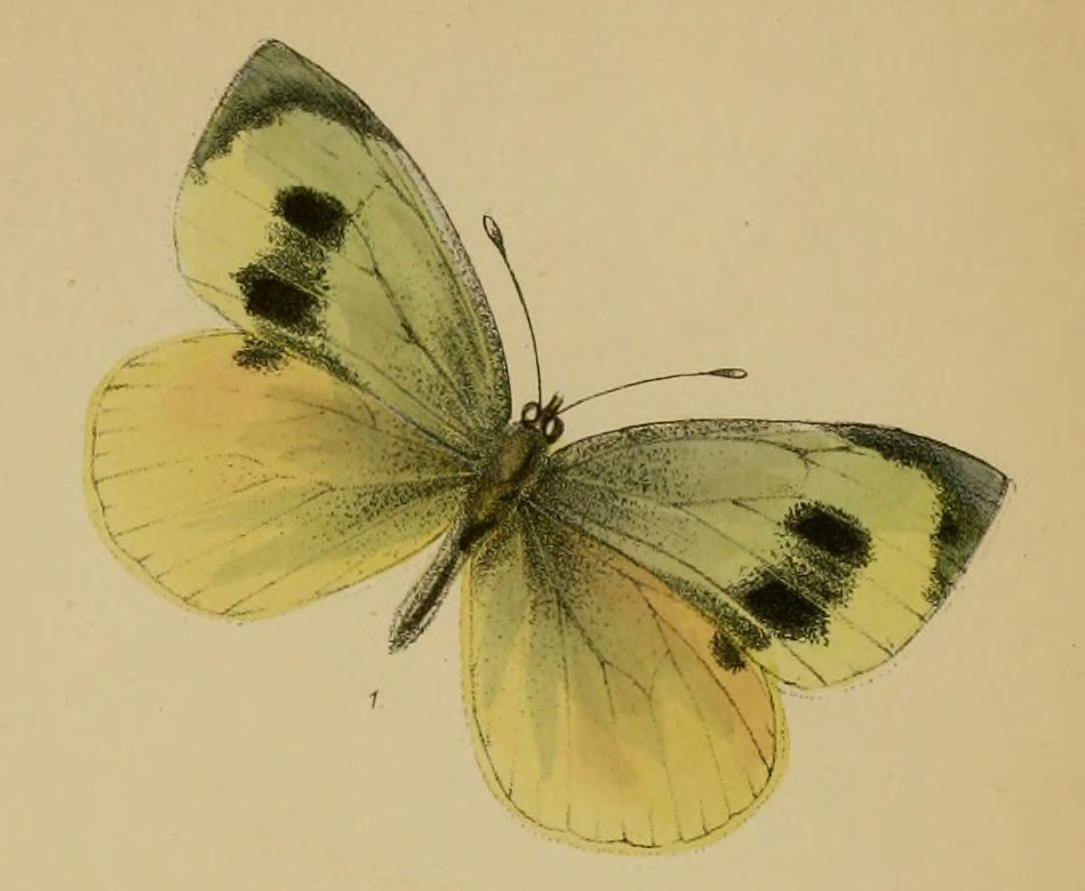
- Female

Conservation status
- Extinct (1994) (IUCN 3.1)

Scientific classification
- Kingdom: Animalia
- Phylum: Arthropoda
- Clade: Pancrustacea
- Class: Insecta
- Order: Lepidoptera
- Family: Pieridae
- Genus: Pieris
- Species: P. brassicae
- Subspecies: †P. b. wollastoni

Trinomial name
- †Pieris brassicae wollastoni (Butler, 1886)

Synonyms
- Ganoris wollastoni Butler, 1886; Pieris wollastoni; Pieris cheiranthi wollastoni

= Madeiran large white =

Madeiran large white butterfly

Possibly extinct subspecies of butterfly

The Madeiran large white (Pieris brassicae wollastoni) was a subspecies of the large white butterfly, endemic to Madeira. It was described by the English entomologist, Arthur Gardiner Butler in 1886.

== Description ==
They can reach a size of 55 to 65 millimeters (2 to 2.5 inches). The wings are pure white with a wide black tip on the apexes of the forewings. Its natural habitat is the laurisilva laurel forest.

Larvae have yellow stripes on the upper part of the green body and has black lumps. Known food plants are nasturtium (Tropaeolum majus) and cabbage (Brassica oleracea).

=== Decline ===
This butterfly was last collected in 1994, and has not been found since despite a 15-year survey during the 1990s and 2000s. It was officially declared extinct by the IUCN in 2023.

The disappearance of this species coincides with the introduction, in the 1950s, of the small white butterfly (Pieris rapae). The mechanisms involved are not fully understood but a viral infection may be involved with the small white introducing a different strain of the granulosis virus, for which the Madeiran large white had no resistance. Another reason may be the introduction of a widely introduced agricultural bioagent, the wasp parasitoid, Cotesia glomerata, which was found in the western Canary Islands in May 2006. It uses the Pieridae as a host and is commonly found where Pieridae species are in abundance.

== Distribution ==
Endemic to Madeira and found in the northern valleys of the laurel forest.

== Etymology ==
The scientific name commemorates Thomas Vernon Wollaston, an English entomologist who has discovered several insect taxa on Madeira.

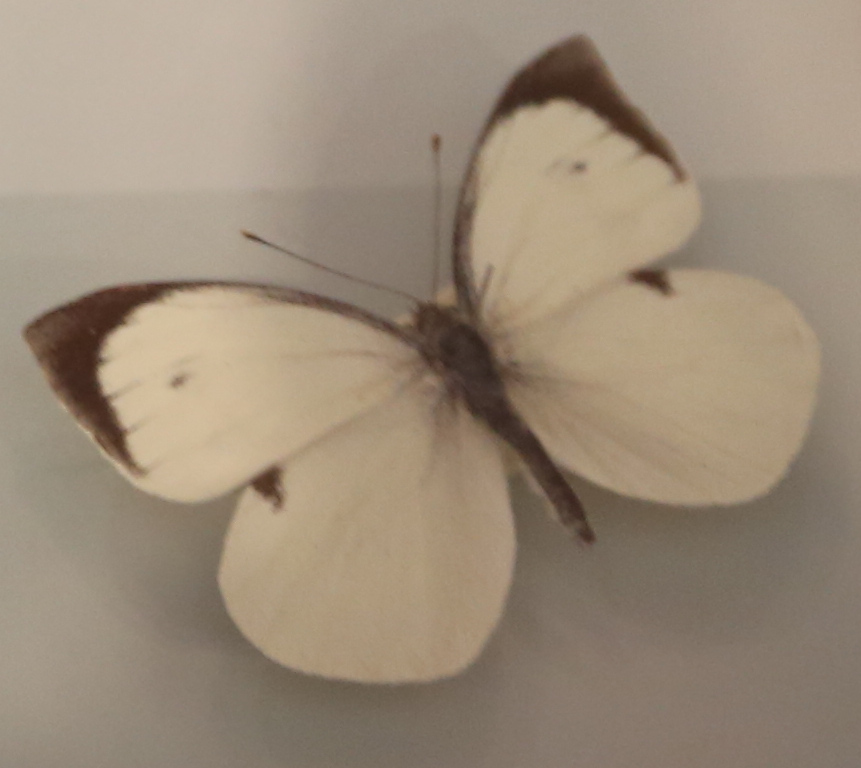
Madeiran Large White (male)
