= Elattoneura leucostigma =

Conservation status
- Endangered (IUCN 3.1)

Scientific classification
- Kingdom: Animalia
- Phylum: Arthropoda
- Class: Insecta
- Order: Odonata
- Suborder: Zygoptera
- Family: Platycnemididae
- Genus: Elattoneura
- Species: E. leucostigma

Binomial name
- Elattoneura leucostigma (Fraser, 1933)

Synonyms
- Disparoneura ramajana (Lieftinck, 1971)

Species of damselfly

Elattoneura leucostigma is a species of damselfly in the family Platycnemididae known commonly as the smoky-winged threadtail. It is endemic to Sri Lanka, where it is known from only one location. It has not been found in any recent surveys. It is known from streams in dense forest habitat, and the area has undergone habitat destruction and pollution of local waterways.
