= Drepanosticta montana =

Conservation status
- Endangered (IUCN 3.1)

Scientific classification
- Kingdom: Animalia
- Phylum: Arthropoda
- Class: Insecta
- Order: Odonata
- Suborder: Zygoptera
- Family: Platystictidae
- Genus: Drepanosticta
- Species: D. montana

Binomial name
- Drepanosticta montana (Hagen, 1860)

Species of damselfly

Drepanosticta montana, the dark knob-tipped shadowdamsel, is a species of damselfly in the family Platystictidae. It is endemic to Sri Lanka. Its natural habitats are subtropical or tropical moist lowland forests and rivers. It is threatened by habitat loss.
