= Thoracistus peringueyi =

Conservation status
- Critically endangered, possibly extinct (IUCN 3.1)

Scientific classification
- Domain: Eukaryota
- Kingdom: Animalia
- Phylum: Arthropoda
- Class: Insecta
- Order: Orthoptera
- Suborder: Ensifera
- Family: Tettigoniidae
- Genus: Thoracistus
- Species: T. peringueyi

Binomial name
- Thoracistus peringueyi (Pictet, 1888)

Species of cricket-like animal

Thoracistus peringueyi, the Peringuey's seedpod shieldback, is a species of katydid in the family Tettigoniidae. The species is endemic to South Africa, and is listed as critically endangered (possibly extinct). It is only known from a male and female specimen that were collected prior to 1879 from a location in Lydenburg district.
