= Anisogomphus solitaris =

Conservation status
- Critically endangered, possibly extinct (IUCN 3.1)

Scientific classification
- Kingdom: Animalia
- Phylum: Arthropoda
- Clade: Pancrustacea
- Class: Insecta
- Order: Odonata
- Infraorder: Anisoptera
- Family: Gomphidae
- Genus: Anisogomphus
- Species: A. solitaris

Binomial name
- Anisogomphus solitaris Lieftinck, 1971

Species of dragonfly

Anisogomphus solitaris is a species of dragonfly in the family Gomphidae. It is endemic to Sri Lanka. Its natural habitat is rivers. It is threatened by habitat loss.
