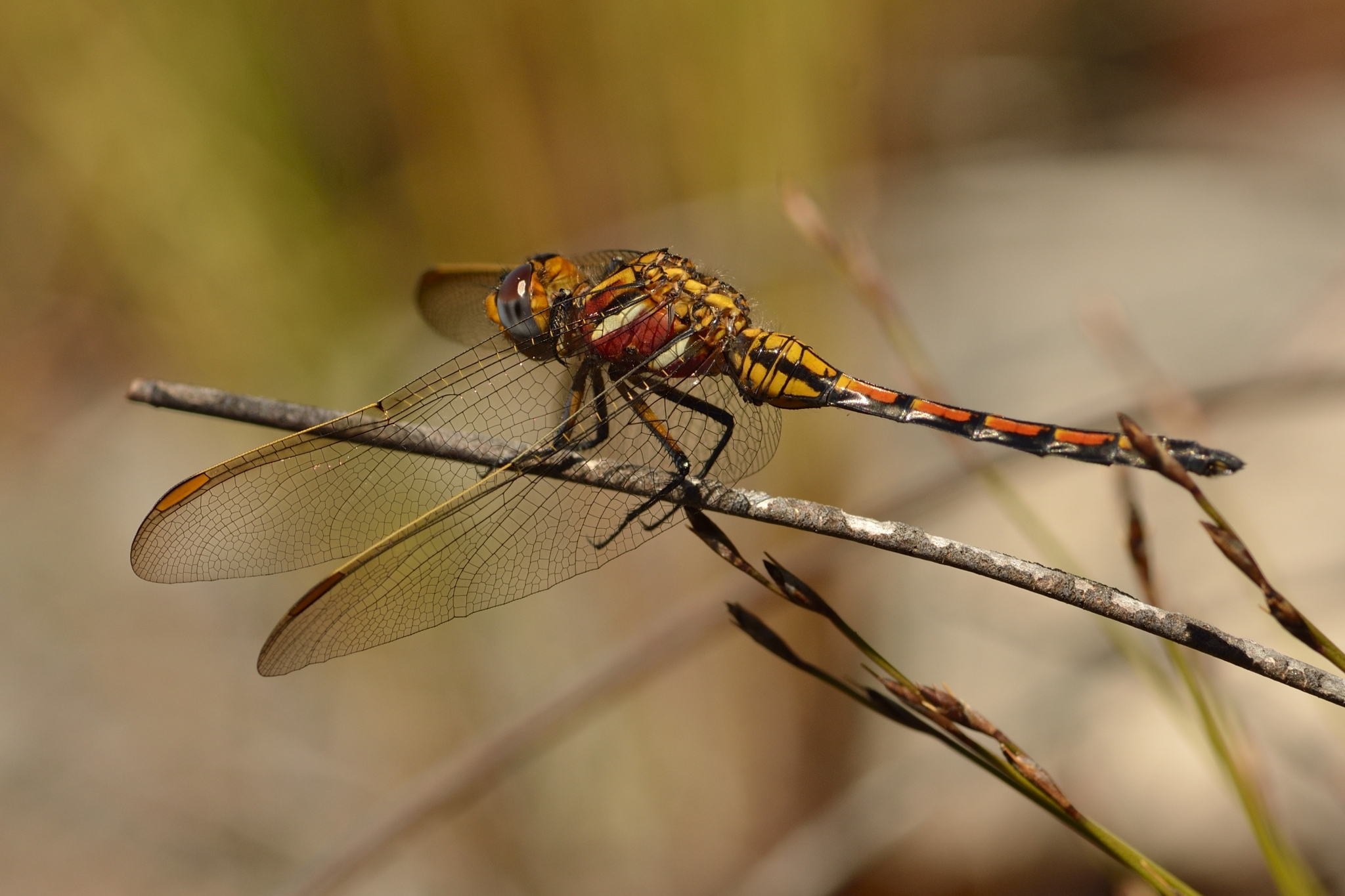

Conservation status
- Vulnerable (IUCN 3.1)

Scientific classification
- Kingdom: Animalia
- Phylum: Arthropoda
- Clade: Pancrustacea
- Class: Insecta
- Order: Odonata
- Infraorder: Anisoptera
- Family: Libellulidae
- Genus: Orthetrum
- Species: O. rubens

Binomial name
- Orthetrum rubens Barnard, 1937

= Orthetrum rubens =

Species of dragonfly

Orthetrum rubens, or the Elusive Skimmer, is a species of dragonfly in the family Libellulidae. It is endemic to South Africa. Its natural habitat is rivers. It is threatened by habitat loss.
