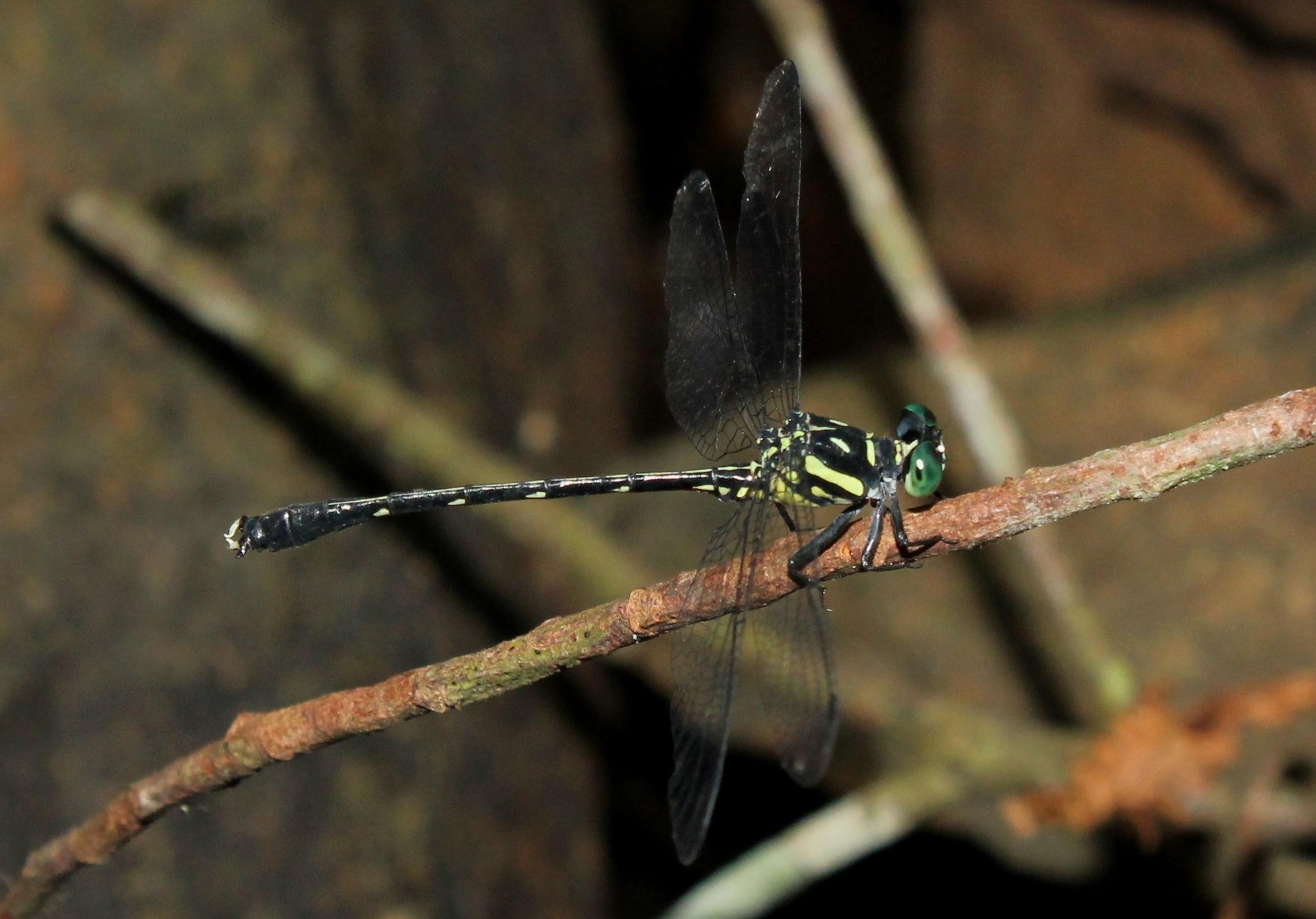
- Heliogomphus lyratus in Sri Lanka

Conservation status
- Endangered (IUCN 3.1)

Scientific classification
- Kingdom: Animalia
- Phylum: Arthropoda
- Clade: Pancrustacea
- Class: Insecta
- Order: Odonata
- Suborder: Anisoptera
- Family: Gomphidae
- Genus: Heliogomphus
- Species: H. lyratus

Binomial name
- Heliogomphus lyratus Fraser, 1933

= Heliogomphus lyratus =

Species of dragonfly

Heliogomphus lyratus is a species of dragonfly in the family Gomphidae. It is endemic to Sri Lanka. Its natural habitats are subtropical or tropical moist lowland forests and rivers. It is threatened by habitat loss.
