= Drepanosticta submontana =

Conservation status
- Endangered (IUCN 3.1)

Scientific classification
- Kingdom: Animalia
- Phylum: Arthropoda
- Class: Insecta
- Order: Odonata
- Suborder: Zygoptera
- Family: Platystictidae
- Genus: Drepanosticta
- Species: D. submontana

Binomial name
- Drepanosticta submontana (Fraser, 1933)

Species of damselfly

Drepanosticta submontana, the bordered knob-tipped shadowdamsel, is a species of damselfly in the family Platystictidae. It is endemic to Sri Lanka. Its natural habitats are subtropical or tropical moist lowland forests and rivers. It is threatened by habitat loss.
