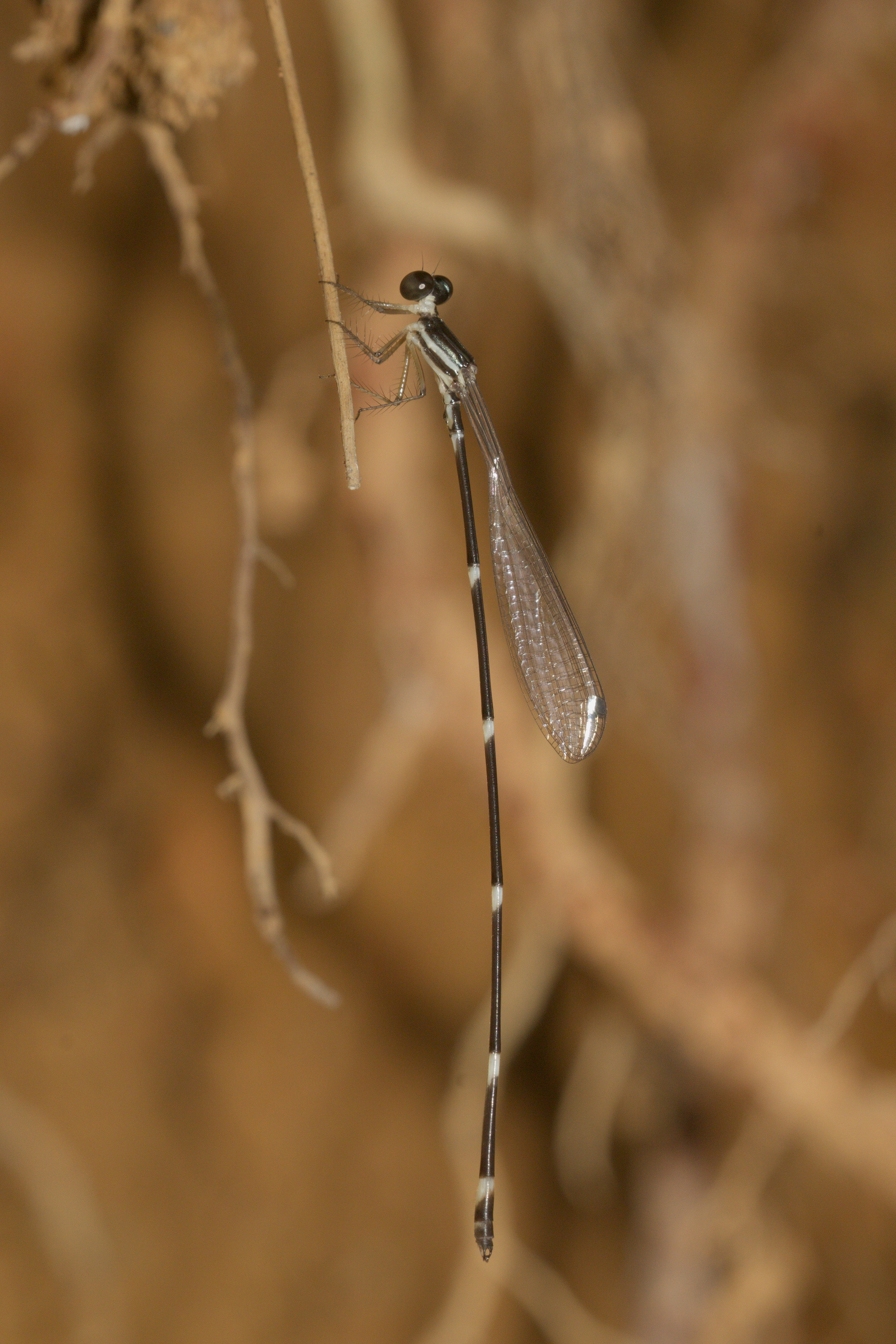
- Protosticta gravelyi, male

Scientific classification
- Kingdom: Animalia
- Phylum: Arthropoda
- Clade: Pancrustacea
- Class: Insecta
- Order: Odonata
- Suborder: Zygoptera
- Superfamily: Platystictoidea; Kennedy, 1920
- Family: Platystictidae; Kennedy, 1920

Subfamilies
- Palaemnematinae; Platystictinae; Protostictinae; Sinostictinae
- Distribution of Platystictidae

= Platystictidae =

Platystictidae Temporal range: Cenomanian–Present

Family of damselflies

Platystictidae is a family of damselflies, commonly known as shadowdamsels. It is the only family in the superfamily Platystictoidea.

Studies of damselfly evolution indicate that Platystictoidea is the second-earliest diverging extant damselfly lineage, after Lestoidea.

They occur mainly in tropical forests of Asia, Central America and South America, where most species inhabit shaded streams.

Shadowdamsels have narrow wings and slender, elongated abdomens. Adults appear to disperse poorly, with many species known only from single localities or very restricted ranges, and additional undescribed species are thought to exist.

== Taxonomic history ==
Kennedy established the subfamily Platystictinae in 1920 to include the genera Platysticta, Palaemnema and Protosticta, recognising them as a distinct lineage based on morphological characters.

In 1938, Tillyard and Fraser elevated the group to family rank as Platystictidae and recognised two subfamilies, Platystictinae and Palaemnematinae.

Molecular phylogenetic studies demonstrated that Platystictidae is an early-diverging lineage of living damselflies, distinct from Coenagrionoidea. In 2013, Dijkstra and colleagues therefore recognised it as the sole extant family of the superfamily Platystictoidea, a classification subsequently supported by phylogenomic studies and, in 2026, retained by Carter and colleagues.

== Phylogeny ==
- Zygoptera
  - Lestoidea
  - - Platystictoidea
    - - Priscagrionoidea
      - - - Tatocnemidoidea
          - Polythoroidea
        - - - Mesopodagrionoidea
            - - Amphipterygoidea
              - Euphaeoidea
          - - - Philogangoidea
              - - Megapodagrionoidea
                - Calopterygoidea
            - Coenagrionoidea

Relationship of Platystictoidea among living damselfly superfamilies, based on Carter et al. (2026).

== Genera ==
The following genera are currently placed in Platystictidae:

- Ceylonosticta Fraser, 1931
- Drepanosticta Laidlaw, 1917
- Indosticta Bedjanic, 2016
- Palaemnema Selys, 1860
- Platysticta Selys, 1860
- Protosticta Selys, 1885
- Sinosticta Wilson, 1997
- Sulcosticta van Tol, 2005
- Telosticta Dow & Orr, 2012
- Yunnanosticta Dow & Zhang, 2018

== Fossils ==
The fossil record of Platystictidae is sparse. One fossil genus has been described from mid-Cretaceous Burmese amber of Myanmar:

- †Mesosticta Huang et al. 2015

== Etymology ==
The superfamily name Platystictoidea is derived from the type genus Platysticta, with the standard zoological suffix -oidea used for animal superfamilies.

The family name Platystictidae is derived from the type genus Platysticta, with the standard zoological suffix -idae used for animal families.

The genus name Platysticta is presumably derived from the Greek πλατύς (platys, "broad") and στικτός (stiktos, "marked"). The name likely alludes to the broad pterostigma, the distinctive "wing mark" emphasised by Selys when he established the genus.

== See also ==
- List of damselflies of the world (Platystictidae)
