= List of Odonata species of Sri Lanka =

Sri Lanka is a tropical island situated close to the southern tip of India. The invertebrate fauna is as large as it is common to other regions of the world. There are approximately 2 million known species of arthropods, and this number continues to grow. Thus, it is difficult to determine the exact number of Odonata species within particular regions. The following is a list of the dragonflies and damselflies of Sri Lanka.

== Dragonflies & Damselflies ==
Phylum: Arthropoda
Class: Insecta
Order: Odonata.

Dragonflies are predators. The larvae inhabit water and adults fly near aquatic places. They are diverse in color and shape. There are major 2 types of odonates in the world; they are dragonflies and damselflies. The eyes are closer together in dragonflies, and their wings are held broadly opened from the body. They are robust in nature. In contrast, damselflies are delicately built small odonates, with well separated compound eyes. During rest, they do not expand their wings; the wings are folded over the abdomen or slightly spread.

Damselflies are categorized in to Suborder: Zygoptera; and dragonflies into Suborder: Anisoptera. 131 described species within 13 families can be found in Sri Lanka, with three new species in 2016.

The 65 endemic species and marked with an asterisk (*).

=== Suborder: Zygoptera - Damselflies ===
Damselflies are insect s of suborder Zygoptera in the order Odonata. They are similar to dragonflies, which constitute the other odonatan suborder, Anisoptera, but are smaller, have slimmer bodies, and most species fold the wings along the body when at rest. An ancient group, damselflies have existed since at least the Lower Permian, and are found on every continent except Antarctica.

All damselflies are predatory; both nymphs and adults eat other insects. The nymphs are aquatic, with different species living in a variety of freshwater habitats including acid bogs, ponds, lakes and rivers. The nymphs moult repeatedly, at the last moult climbing out of the water to undergo metamorphosis. The skin splits down the back, they emerge and inflate their wings and abdomen to gain their adult form. Their presence on a body of water indicates that it is relatively unpolluted, but their dependence on freshwater makes them vulnerable to damage to their wetland habitats.

64 Damselfly species can be found in Sri Lanka.

==== Family: Calopterygidae - Jewelwings ====
Common name	Binomial	Local subspecies	Male	Female
Stream glory	Neurobasis chinensis	ssp.chinensis		
Black-tipped forest glory	Vestalis apicalis	ssp.nigrescens*		

==== Family: Chlorocyphidae - Jewels ====
Common name	Binomial	Local subspecies	Male	Female
Adam's gem	Libellago adami*			
Ultima gem	Libellago finalis*			
Green's gem	Libellago greeni*			
Corbett's gem	Libellago corbeti*			

==== Family: Euphaeidae - Gossamerwings ====
Common name	Binomial	Local subspecies	Male	Female
Shining gossamerwing	Euphaea splendens*			

==== Family: Lestidae - Spreadwings ====
Common name	Binomial	Local subspecies	Male	Female
Sri Lanka reedling	Indolestes divisus*			
Mountain reedling	Indolestes gracilis	ssp.gracilis*		
Emerald spreadwing	Lestes elatus			
Malabar spreadwing	Lestes malabaricus			
Scalloped spreadwing	Lestes praemorsus	ssp.decipiens		
Emerald Sri Lanka spreadwing	Sinhalestes orientalis*			

==== Family: Coenagrionidae - Narrow-winged damselflies ====
Common name	Binomial	Local subspecies	Male	Female
Green striped slender dartlet	Aciagrion occidentale			
Variable wisp	Agriocnemis femina	ssp.femina		
Pygmy wisp	Agriocnemis pygmaea			
Azure dartlet	Amphiallagma parvum			
Lieftinck's sprite	Archibasis lieftincki*			
Long-banded bluetail	Archibasis oscillans	ssp. hanwellanensis*		
Orange-tailed marsh dart	Ceriagrion cerinorubellum			
Coromandel marsh dart	Ceriagrion coromandelianum			
Golden dartlet	Ischnura aurora	ssp.aurora		
Marsh bluetail	Ischnura senegalensis			
Sri Lanka midget	Mortonagrion ceylonicum*			
Three striped blue dart	Pseudagrion decorum			
Malabar sprite	Pseudagrion malabaricum			
Blue riverdamsel	Pseudagrion microcephalum			
Saffron-faced blue dart	Pseudagrion rubriceps	ssp.ceylonicum*		

==== Family: Platycnemididae - Threadtails ====
Common name	Binomial	Local subspecies	Male	Female
Two-spotted threadtail	Elattoneura oculata*			
Jungle threadtail	Elattoneura caesia*			
Dark-glittering threadtail	Elattoneura centralis*			
Smoky-winged threadtail	Elattoneura leucostigma*			
Red-striped threadtail	Elattoneura tenax*			
Stripe-headed threadtail	Prodasineura sita*			
Marsh dancer	Onychargia atrocyana			
Yellow bush dart	Copera marginipes			

==== Family: Platystictidae - Shadowdamsels ====
Common name	Binomial	Local subspecies	Male	Female
Alwis's shadowdamsel	Ceylonosticta alwisi*			
Ana Mia's shadowdamsel	Ceylonosticta anamia*			
Bine's shadowdamsel	Ceylonosticta bine*			
	Ceylonosticta mirifica*			
	Ceylonosticta mojca*			
Alwisi's shadowdamsel	Ceylonosticta nancyae*			
Rupasinghe's shadowdamsel	Ceylonosticta rupasinghe*			
	Ceylonosticta venusta*			
	Drepanosticta adami*			
	Drepanosticta austeni*			
Brinck's shadowdamsel	Drepanosticta brincki*			
Nobel shadowdamsel	Drepanosticta digna*			
Merry shadowdamsel	Drepanosticta hilaris*			
Drooping shadowdamsel	Drepanosticta lankanensis*			
Dark knob-tipped shadowdamsel	Drepanosticta montana*			
Nietner's shadowdamsel	Drepanosticta nietneri*			
Bordered knob-tipped shadowdamsel	Drepanosticta submontana*			
Blue-shouldered cornuted shadowdamsel	Drepanosticta subtropica*			
Dark-shouldered cornuted shadowdamsel	Drepanosticta tropica*			
Wall's shadowdamsel	Drepanosticta walli*			
Dark forestwraith	Platysticta apicalis*			
Blurry forestdamsel	Platysticta maculata*			
	Platysticta secreta*			
	Platysticta serendibica*			

=== Suborder: Anisoptera - Dragonflies. ===
A dragonfly is an insect belonging to the order Odonata, suborder Anisoptera (from Greek ἄνισος anisos "uneven" and πτερόν pteron, "wing", because the hindwing is broader than the forewing). Adult dragonflies are characterized by large multifaceted eyes, two pairs of strong transparent wings, sometimes with coloured patches and an elongated body. Dragonflies can be mistaken for the related group, damselflies (Zygoptera), which are similar in structure, though usually lighter in build; however, the wings of most dragonflies are held flat and away from the body, while damselflies hold the wings folded at rest, along or above the abdomen. Dragonflies are agile fliers, while damselflies have a weaker, fluttery flight. Many dragonflies have brilliant iridescent or metallic colours produced by structural coloration, making them conspicuous in flight. An adult dragonfly eye has nearly 24,000 ommatidia.

Dragonflies are predators, both in their aquatic larval stage, when they are known as nymphs or naiads, and as adults. Several years of their lives are spent as nymphs living in fresh water; the adults may be on the wing for just a few days or weeks. They are fast, agile fliers, sometimes migrating across oceans, and are often found near water.

There are 65 Dragonfly species can be found in Sri Lanka.

==== Family: Aeshnidae - Hawkers ====
Common name	Binomial	Local subspecies	Male	Female
Donald's Hawker	Anaciaeschna donaldi			
Pale-spotted emperor	Anax guttatus			
Magnificent emperor	Anax immaculifrons			
Lesser green emperor	Anax indicus			
Black emperor	Anax tristis			
Vagrant emperor	Anax ephippiger			
Brown darner	Gynacantha dravida			
	Gynacantha millardi			

==== Family: Gomphidae - Club-tail dragonflies ====
Common name	Binomial	Local subspecies	Male	Female
	Anisogomphus ceylonensis*			
Sinuate clubtail	Burmagomphus pyramidalis	ssp.sinuatus*		
	Cyclogomphus gynostylus*			
Rivulet tiger	Gomphidia pearsoni*			
Lyrate grappletail	Heliogomphus lyratus*			
Nietner's grappletail	Heliogomphus nietneri*			
Wall's grappletail	Heliogomphus walli*			
Indian Common Clubtail	Ictinogomphus rapax			
Keiser's forktail	Macrogomphus annulatus*	ssp.keiseri*		
Sri Lankan Forktail	Macrogomphus lankanensis*			
	Microgomphus wijaya*			
Sri Lanka sabretail	Megalogomphus ceylonicus*			
Brook hooktail	Paragomphus henryi*			
	Paragomphus campestris*			

==== Family: Macromiidae - Cruisers ====
Common name	Binomial	Local subspecies	Male	Female
Common torrent hawk	Epophthalmia vittata	ssp.cyanocephala*		
	Macromia flinti*			
Sri Lanka cruiser	Macromia zeylanica*			

==== Family: Libellulidae - Skimmers ====
Common name	Binomial	Local subspecies	Male	Female
Asian pintail	Acisoma panorpoides	ssp.panorpoides		
Scarlet marsh hawk	Aethriamanta brevipennis	ssp.brevipennis		
Little Blue marsh hawk	Brachydiplax sobrina			
Ditch jewel	Brachythemis contaminata			
Granite ghost	Bradinopyga geminata			
Scarlet skimmer	Crocothemis servilia	ssp.servilia		
Line forest-skimmer	Cratilla lineata	ssp.calverti		
Black-tipped percher	Diplacodes nebulosa			
Chalky percher	Diplacodes trivialis			
Amber-winged marsh glider	Hydrobasileus croceus			
Fruhstorfer's junglewatcher	Hylaeothemis fruhstorferi	ssp.fruhstorferi*		
Black marsh skimmer	Indothemis carnatica			
Restless demon	Indothemis limbata	ssp.sita		
Asiatic blood tail	Lathrecista asiatica	ssp.asiatica		
	Lyriothemis defonsekai*			
Coastal glider	Macrodiplax cora			
Paddyfield parasol	Neurothemis intermedia	ssp.intermedia		
Pied paddy skimmer	Neurothemis tullia			
Aggressive riverhawk	Onychothemis tonkinensis	ssp.ceylanica		
Spine-tufted skimmer	Orthetrum chrysis			
Blue marsh hawk	Orthetrum glaucum			
Marsh skimmer	Orthetrum luzonicum			
Crimson-tailed marsh hawk	Orthetrum pruinosum	ssp.neglectum		
Slender skimmer	Orthetrum sabina	ssp.sabina		
Blue-tailed forest hawk	Orthetrum triangulare	ssp.triangulare		
Globe skimmer	Pantala flavescens			
Yellow-tailed ashy skimmer	Potamarcha congener			
Spine–legged redbolt	Rhodothemis rufa			
Sapphire flutterer	Rhyothemis triangularis			
Common picture wing	Rhyothemis variegata	ssp.variegata		
Red-veined darter	Sympetrum fonscolombii			
Elf	Tetrathemis yerburii*			
Coral-tailed cloudwing	Tholymis tillarga			
Crimson marsh glider	Trithemis aurora			
Black stream glider	Trithemis festiva			
Dancing dropwing	Trithemis pallidinervis			
Keyhole glider	Tramea basilaris	ssp.burmeisteri		
Black marsh trotter	Tramea limbata			
Greater crimson glider	Urothemis signata	ssp.signata		
Emerald cascader	Zygonyx iris	ssp.ceylonicum		
Long-tailed duskdarter	Zyxomma petiolatum			

== See also ==
- List of Odonata species of Britain
- List of Odonata species of Ireland
- List of Odonata species of India
- List of Odonata species of South Africa
- List of Odonata species of Taiwan
