= Ceylonosticta =

Scientific classification
- Kingdom: Animalia
- Phylum: Arthropoda
- Clade: Pancrustacea
- Class: Insecta
- Order: Odonata
- Suborder: Zygoptera
- Family: Platystictidae
- Subfamily: Platystictinae
- Genus: Ceylonosticta; Fraser, 1931

Species
- See text

Genus of damselflies

Ceylonosticta is a genus of damselfly in the family Platystictidae, and subfamily Platystictinae. Some authors consider some species to be in the genus Drepanosticta. Three new species were described from Sri Lanka in late 2016 with a rediscovery of Ceylonosticta subtropica. The World Odonata List includes 23 species.

== Species ==
The genus includes the following species:

- Ceylonosticta adami
- Ceylonosticta alwisi
- Ceylonosticta anamia
- Ceylonosticta austeni
- Ceylonosticta bine
- Ceylonosticta brincki
- Ceylonosticta digna
- Ceylonosticta hilaris
- Ceylonosticta inferioreducta
- Ceylonosticta lankanensis
- Ceylonosticta mirifica
- Ceylonosticta mojca
- Ceylonosticta montana
- Ceylonosticta nancyae
- Ceylonosticta nietneri
- Ceylonosticta rupasinghe
- Ceylonosticta submontana
- Ceylonosticta subtropica
- Ceylonosticta tropica
- Ceylonosticta venusta
- Ceylonosticta walli
