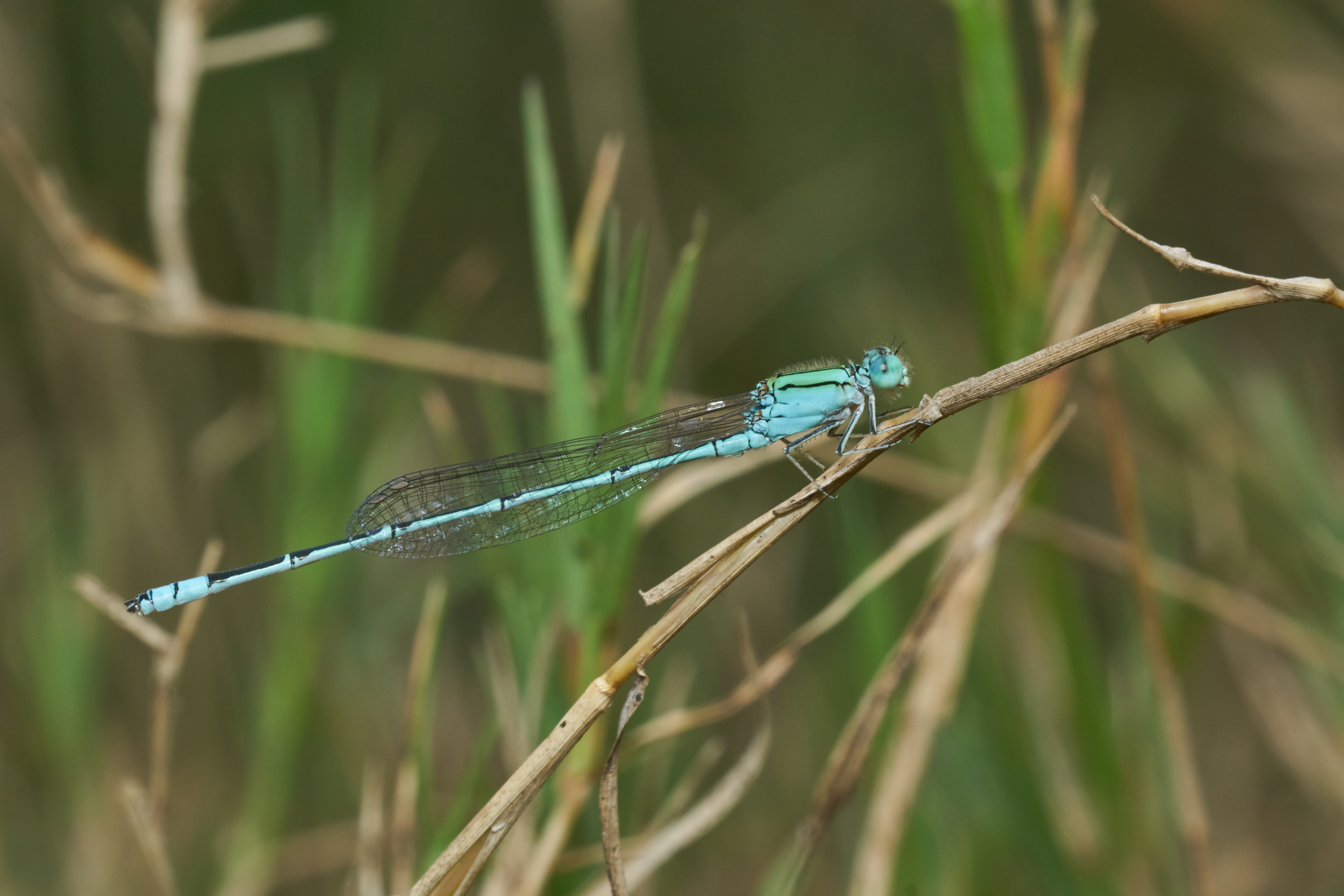
- male
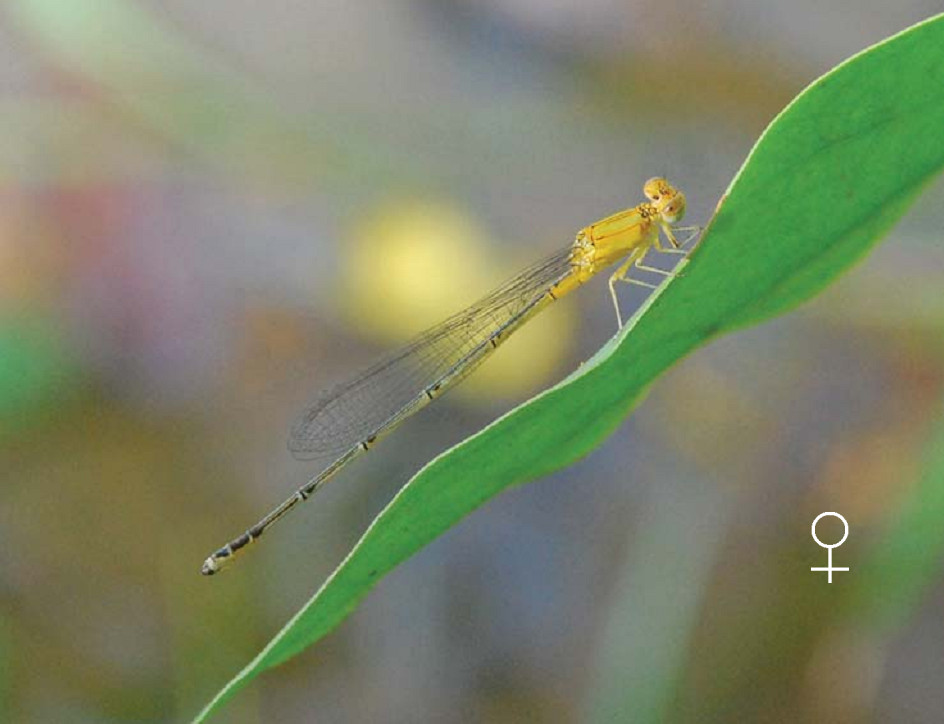
- female

Conservation status
- Least Concern (IUCN 3.1)

Scientific classification
- Kingdom: Animalia
- Phylum: Arthropoda
- Clade: Pancrustacea
- Class: Insecta
- Order: Odonata
- Suborder: Zygoptera
- Family: Coenagrionidae
- Genus: Pseudagrion
- Species: P. decorum

Binomial name
- Pseudagrion decorum (Rambur, 1842)

= Pseudagrion decorum =

Elegant sprite

Species of damselfly

Pseudagrion decorum, elegant sprite or three striped blue dart, is a species of damselfly in the family Coenagrionidae. It is found in many tropical Asian countries.

== Description and habitat ==
It is a medium-sized damselfly with bluish green eyes with a tiny black spot on the top, paler below. Its thorax is bluish green on dorsum, and azure blue on the lower sides. There is a very thin and black mid-dorsal carina, bordered with equally narrow black lines, running close and parallel to it on each side. There is a narrow black humeral stripe and a short black point at the upper part of postero-lateral suture. Winqs are transparent with diamond-shaped pterostigma. Abdomen is azure blue with dorsal black mark up to segment 7. Segments 8 to 10 have only narrow apical black lines. Superior anal appendages are azure blue with black tips. Female has dull colored thorax and abdomen, mid-dorsal black stripe extended to the last segment.

It breeds in slow flowing marshy streams and lakes in the lowland. Commonly seen along shoreline or on emergent vegetation; seen from hilly areas only during the migration.

== See also ==
- List of odonates of India
- List of odonates of Sri Lanka
- List of odonata of Kerala
