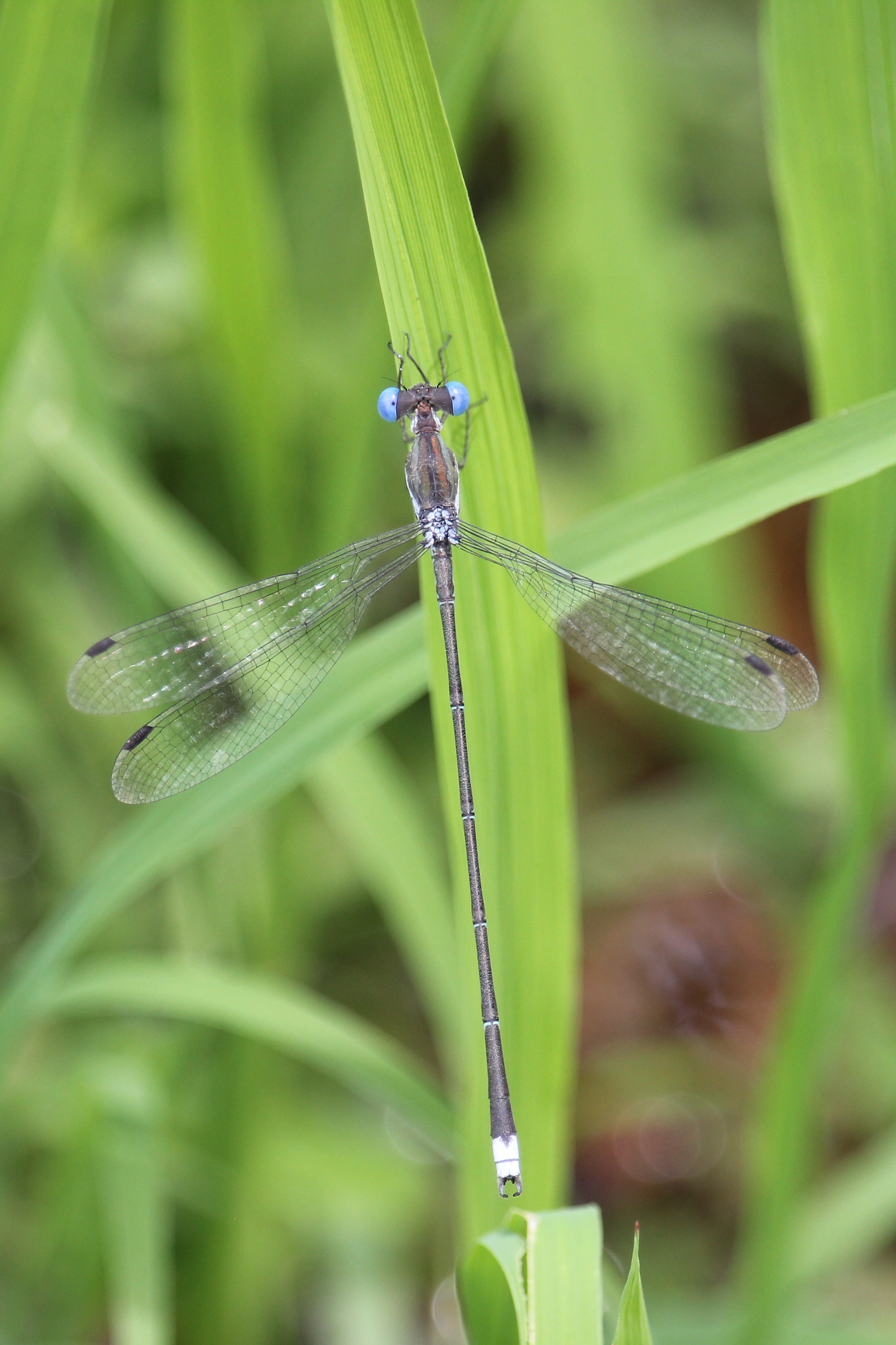
- Male

Scientific classification
- Domain: Eukaryota
- Kingdom: Animalia
- Phylum: Arthropoda
- Class: Insecta
- Order: Odonata
- Suborder: Zygoptera
- Family: Lestidae
- Genus: Lestes
- Species: L. malabaricus

Binomial name
- Lestes malabaricus Fraser, 1929

Synonyms
- Lestes malabarica Fraser, 1929

= Lestes malabaricus =

Species of damselfly

Lestes malabaricus is a species of damselfly in the family Lestidae. It is native to Sri Lanka, southern India and the Andaman Islands.

It looks very similar to Lestes elatus and can only be distinguished by the shape of the superior and inferior anal appendages, and by the absence of the ventro-lateral black spot on the thorax.

== See also ==
- List of odonata of Kerala
- Malabar region
- Malabar Coast moist forests — ecoregion.
