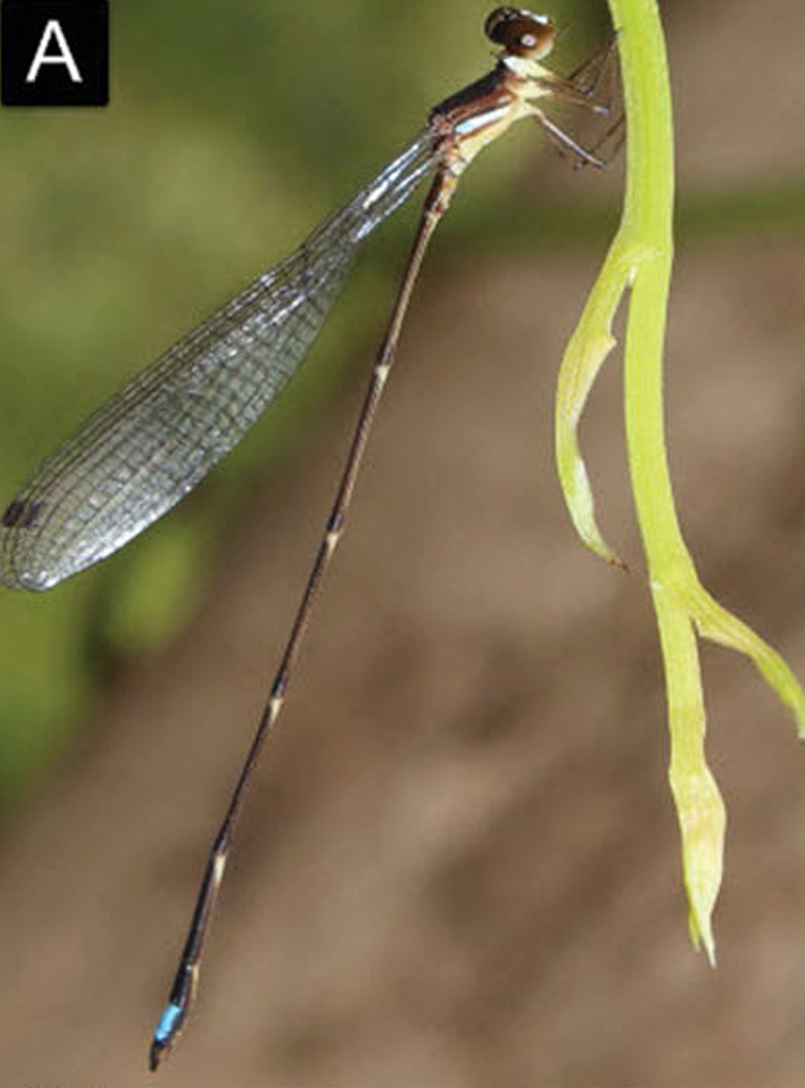

Scientific classification
- Kingdom: Animalia
- Phylum: Arthropoda
- Class: Insecta
- Order: Odonata
- Suborder: Zygoptera
- Family: Platystictidae
- Genus: Ceylonosticta
- Species: C. alwisi

Binomial name
- Ceylonosticta alwisi Priyadarshana, Wijewardana & Herath, 2016

= Ceylonosticta alwisi =

Species of damselfly

Ceylonosticta alwisi, or Alwis's shadowdamsel, is a species of damselfly in the family Platystictidae. It is endemic to Sri Lanka, which was found recently from Samanala Nature Reserve, Ratnapura.

== Etymology ==
The species name alwisi was named as an honor for Lyn De Alwis, who is the founder of the Young Zoologists’ Association, Sri Lanka in 1972, and former director of the National Zoological Garden, Dehiwala.

== See also ==
- List of odonates of Sri Lanka
