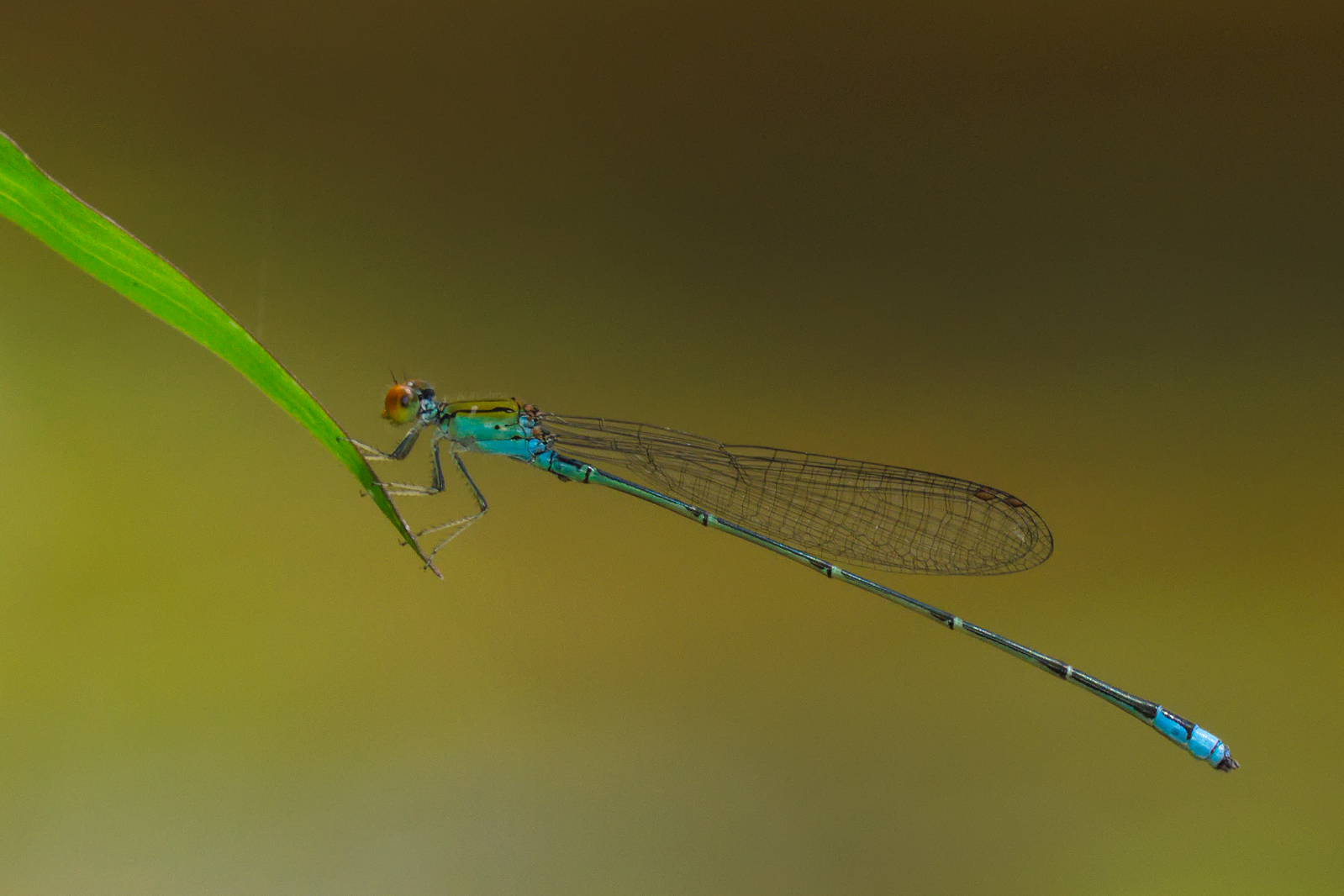
- Male
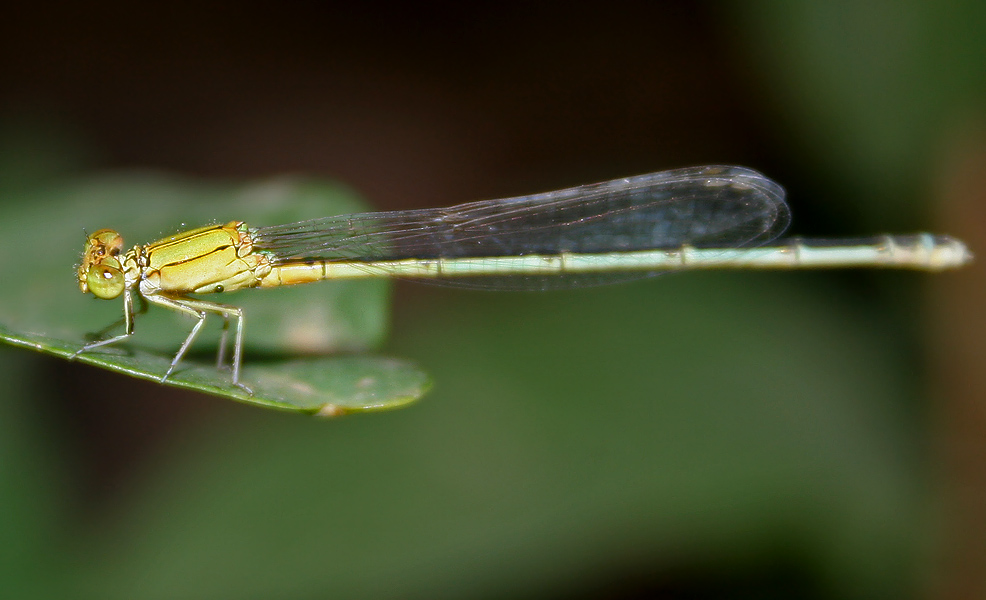
- Female

Conservation status
- Least Concern (IUCN 3.1)

Scientific classification
- Kingdom: Animalia
- Phylum: Arthropoda
- Clade: Pancrustacea
- Class: Insecta
- Order: Odonata
- Suborder: Zygoptera
- Family: Coenagrionidae
- Genus: Pseudagrion
- Species: P. rubriceps

Binomial name
- Pseudagrion rubriceps Selys, 1876

Synonyms
- Pseudagrion flavifrons Needham & Gyger, 1939; Archibasis ceylonica Kirby, 1891

= Pseudagrion rubriceps =

Saffron-faced blue dart

Species of damselfly

Pseudagrion rubriceps, saffron-faced blue dart, is a species of damselfly in the family Coenagrionidae. It is found in many tropical Asian countries.

== Description and habitat ==
It is a medium sized damselfly with bright orange eyes, greenish below. The male is easily distinguished from all other Pseudagrion species by the brilliant reddish-orange face, from which it derives its common name. Its thorax is olive green above and azure blue on the sides. There is a narrow mid-dorsal carina and humeral stripes in black. Abdomen is blue on the sides, broadly marked with black on dorsum, up to segment 8. Segments 9 and 10 are azure blue without any marks. Anal appendages are black.

Eyes, face and thorax of the female is yellowish green, marked as in the male. Color of the abdomen is similar to the male; but paler. Segments 8 and 9 are also black with fine apical blue rings. Segment 10 is pale blue.

Widely distributed throughout the plains and submontane areas. It breeds in weedy streams and ponds.

== Subspecies ==
Two subspecies recognized.

- Pseudagrion rubriceps ceylonicum - Endemic to Sri Lanka
- Pseudagrion rubriceps rubriceps - Other Asian countries.

== See also ==
- List of odonates of India
- List of odonates of Sri Lanka
- List of odonata of Kerala
