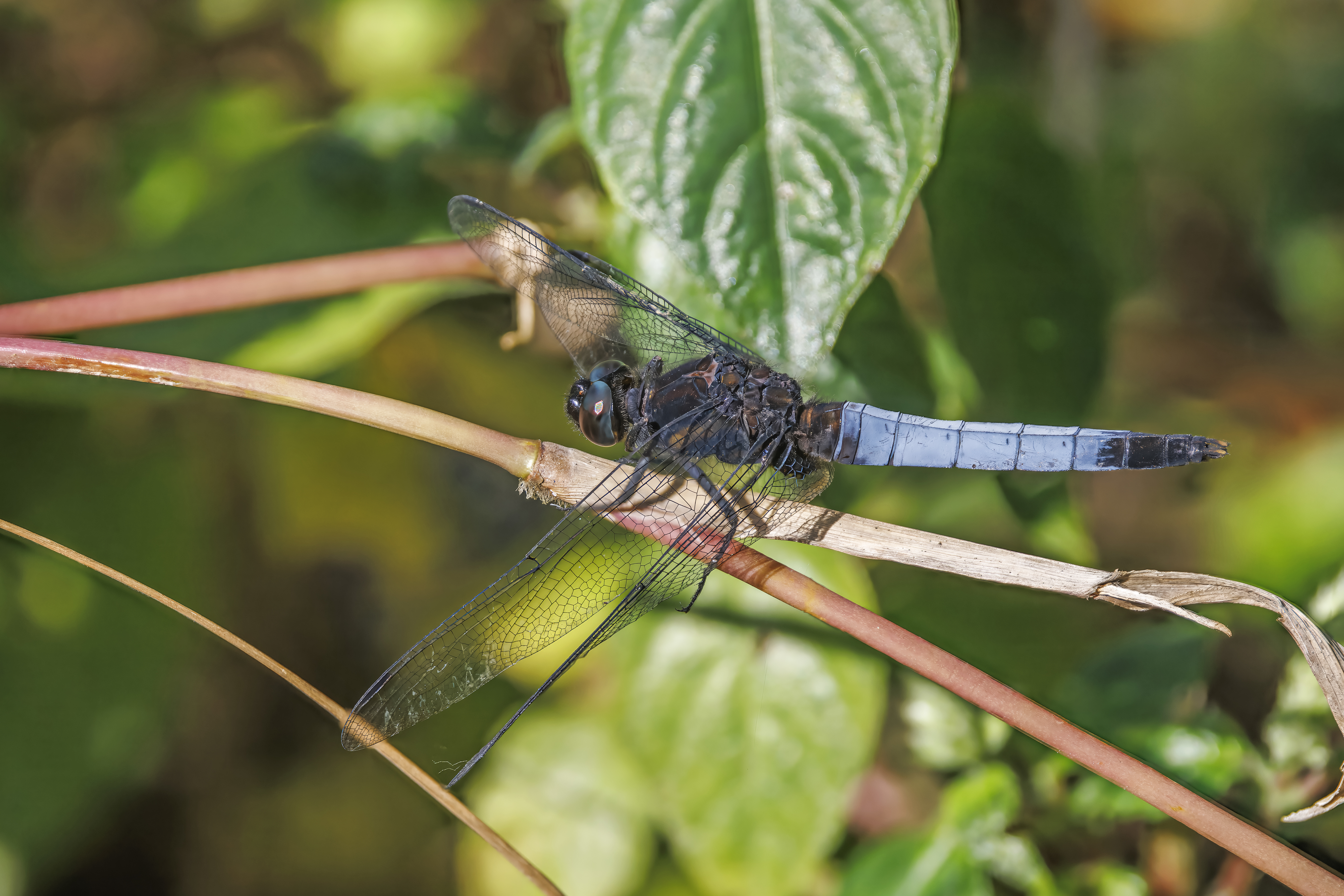
- O. t. triangulare, male, Taiwan

Conservation status
- Least Concern (IUCN 3.1)

Scientific classification
- Kingdom: Animalia
- Phylum: Arthropoda
- Clade: Pancrustacea
- Class: Insecta
- Order: Odonata
- Infraorder: Anisoptera
- Family: Libellulidae
- Genus: Orthetrum
- Species: O. triangulare

Binomial name
- Orthetrum triangulare (Selys, 1878)

Synonyms
- Orthetrum chandrabali Mehrotra, 1961

= Orthetrum triangulare =

Species of dragonfly

Orthetrum triangulare is an Asian freshwater dragonfly species. The common name for this species is blue-tailed forest hawk. Two subspecies of Orthetrum triangulare are currently recognised, the nominate subspecies and O. t. malaccense.

== Description and habitat ==
It is a medium-sized dragonfly with dark face and bluish eyes. Its thorax is also black with a broad apple green stripe on both sides. Segments 1-2 and 8–10 in the abdomen are black and the remaining segments are pruinosed with azure blue. It is usually found in marshes associated with hill streams where it breeds.

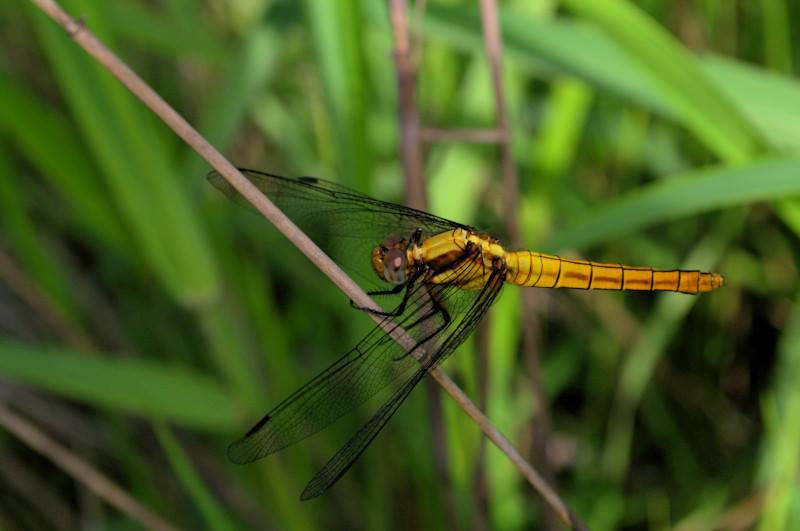
O. t. triangulare, female

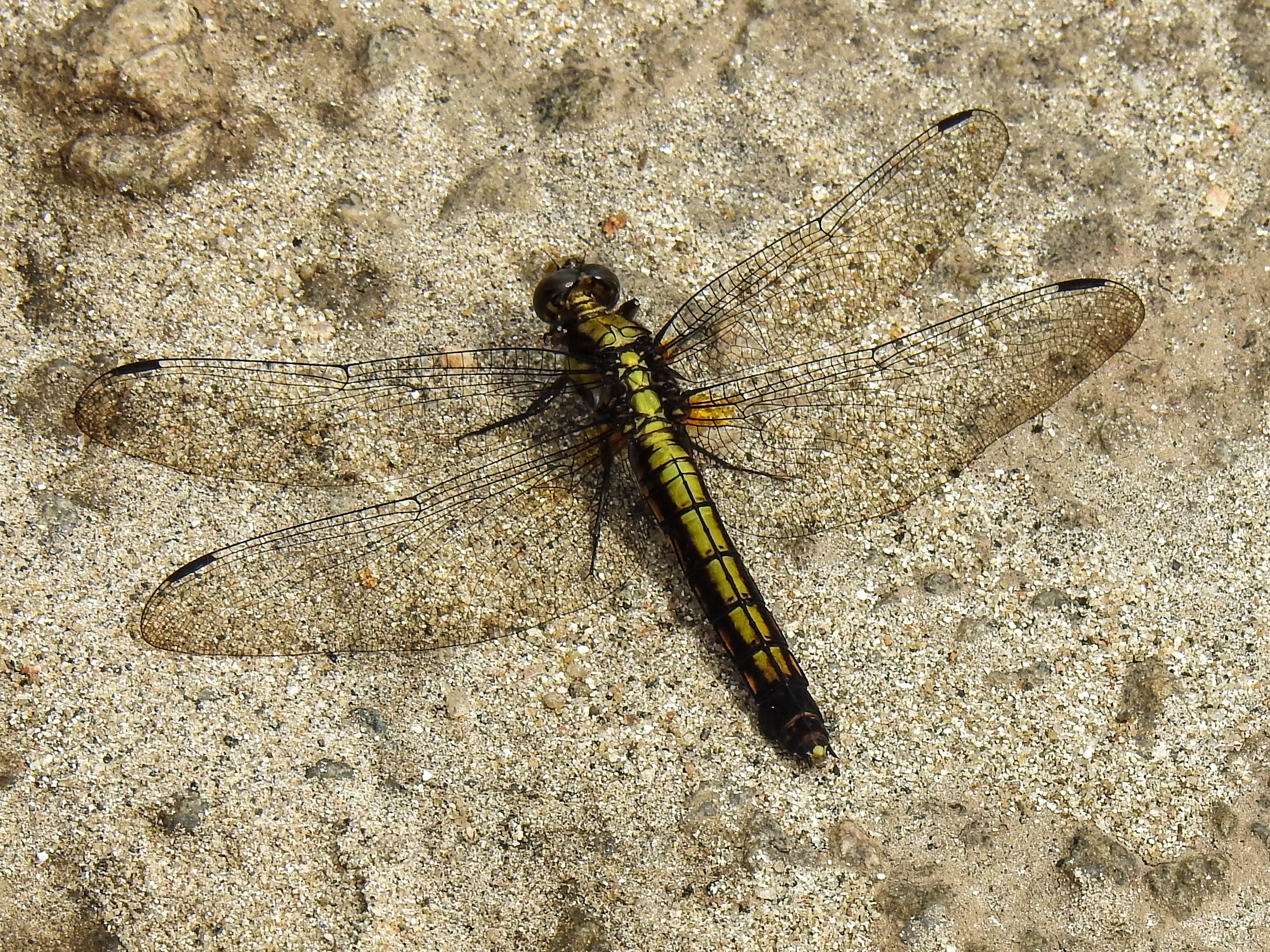
O. t. triangulare, female

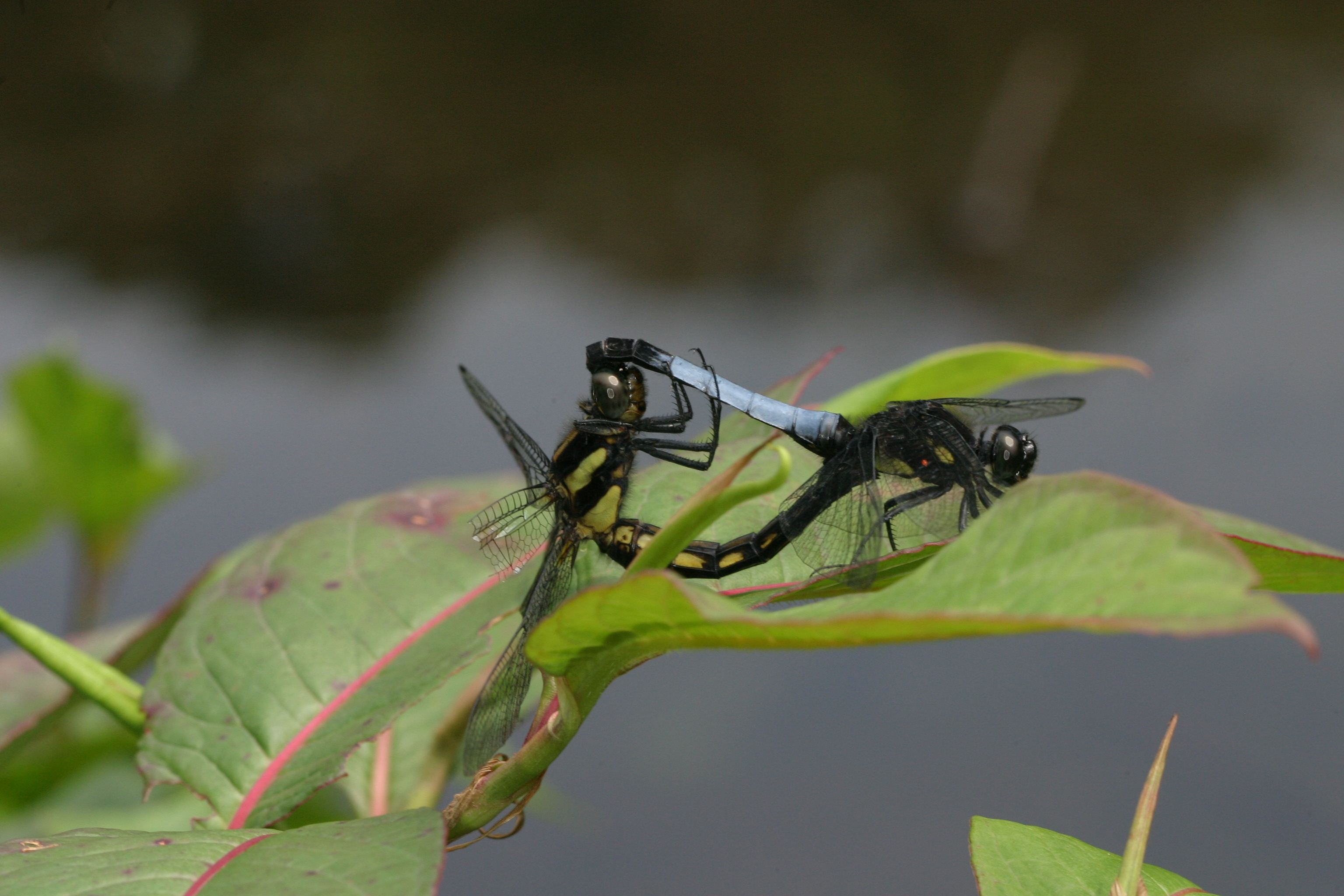
O. t. triangulare, mating pair

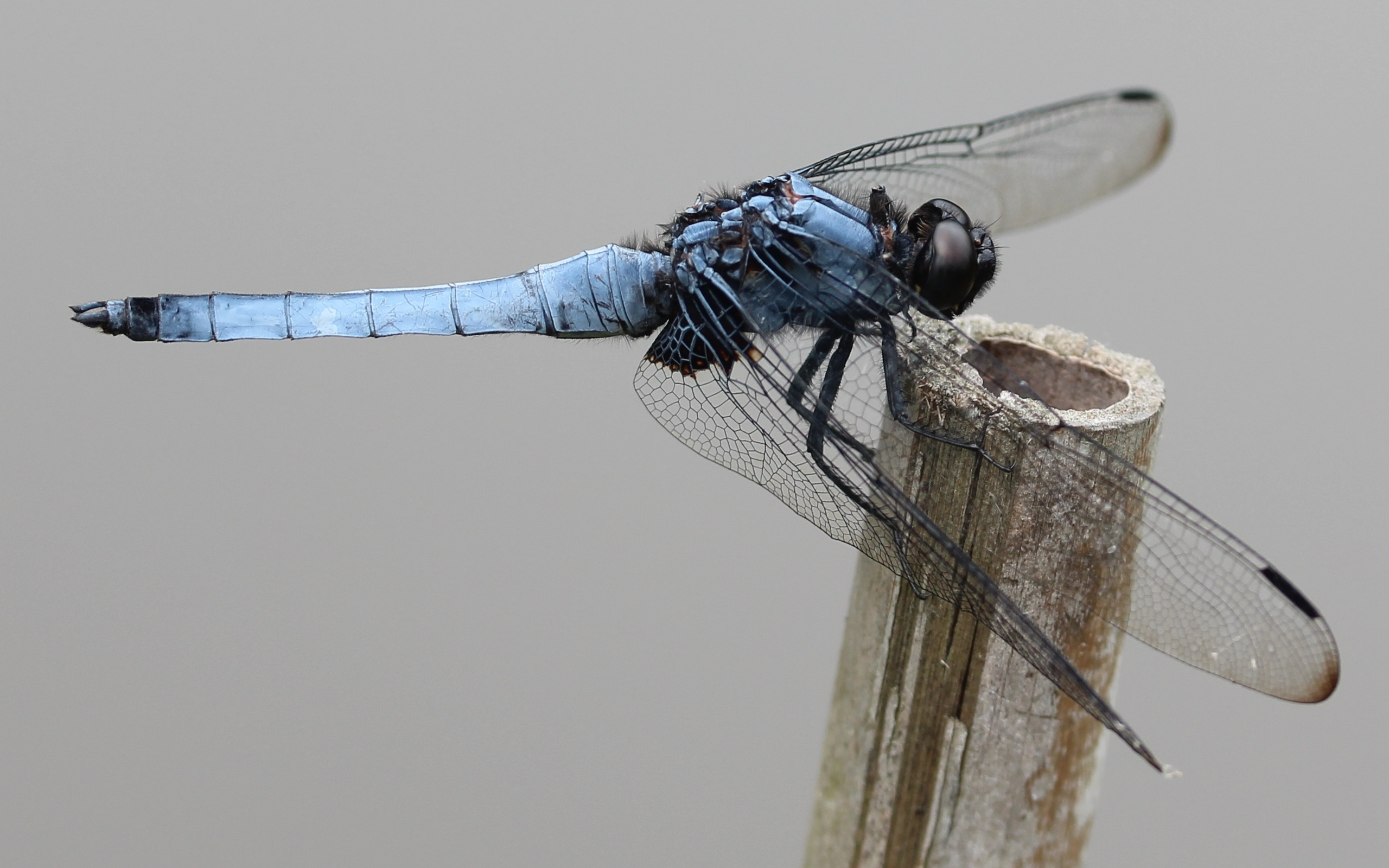
O. t. malaccense, male

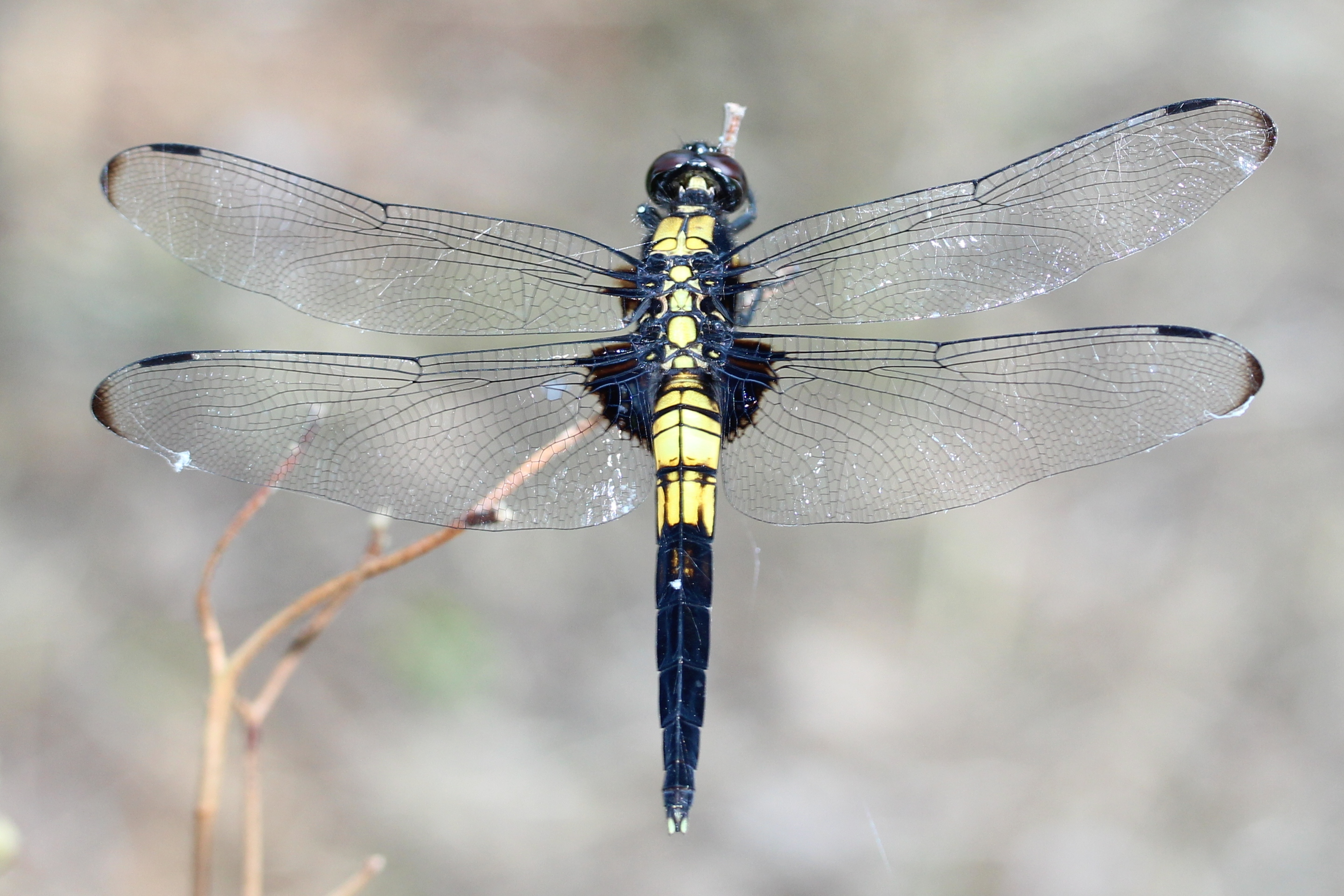
O. t. malaccense, young male

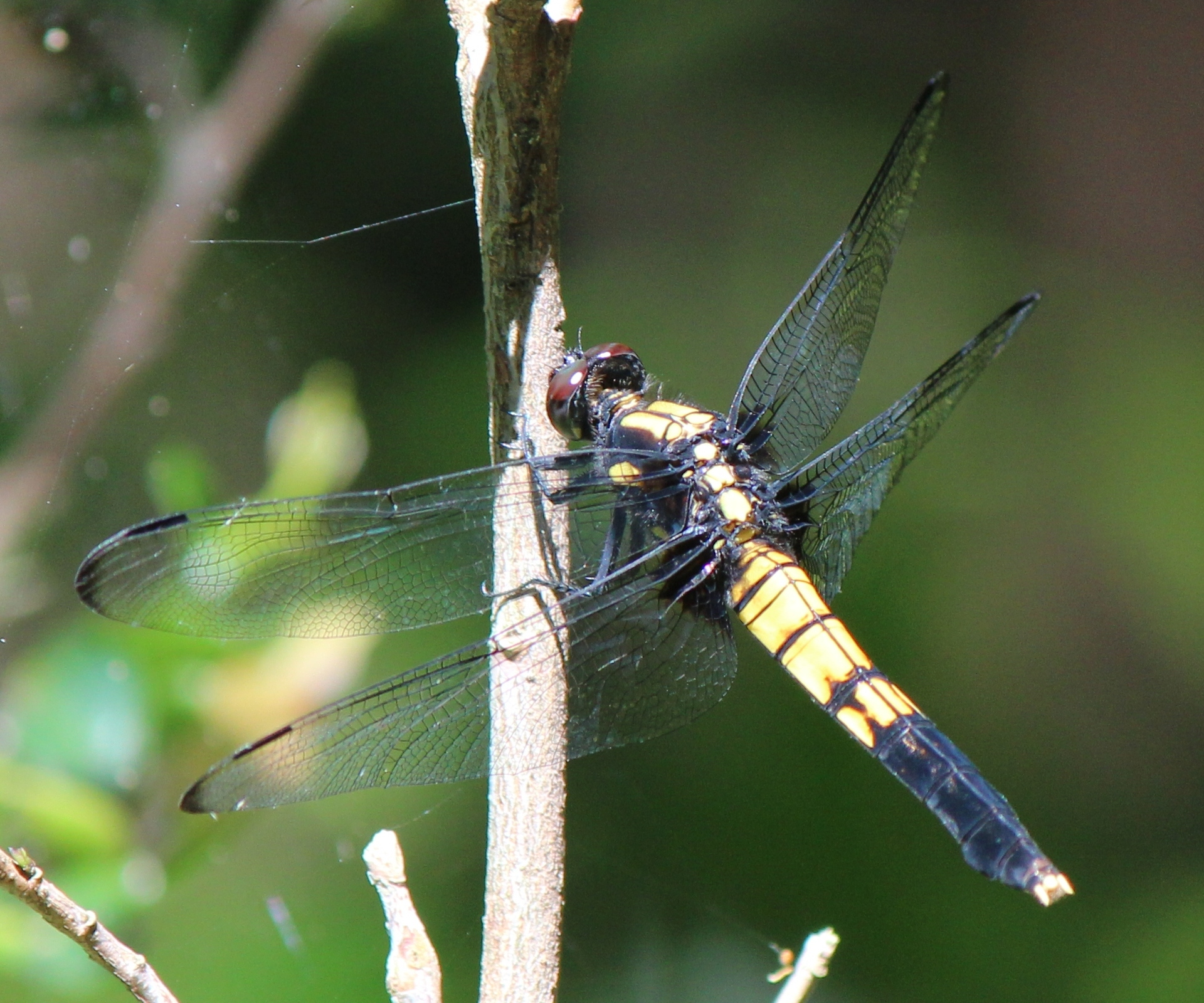
O. t. malaccense, female

== See also ==
- List of odonates of Sri Lanka
- List of odonates of India
- List of odonata of Kerala
