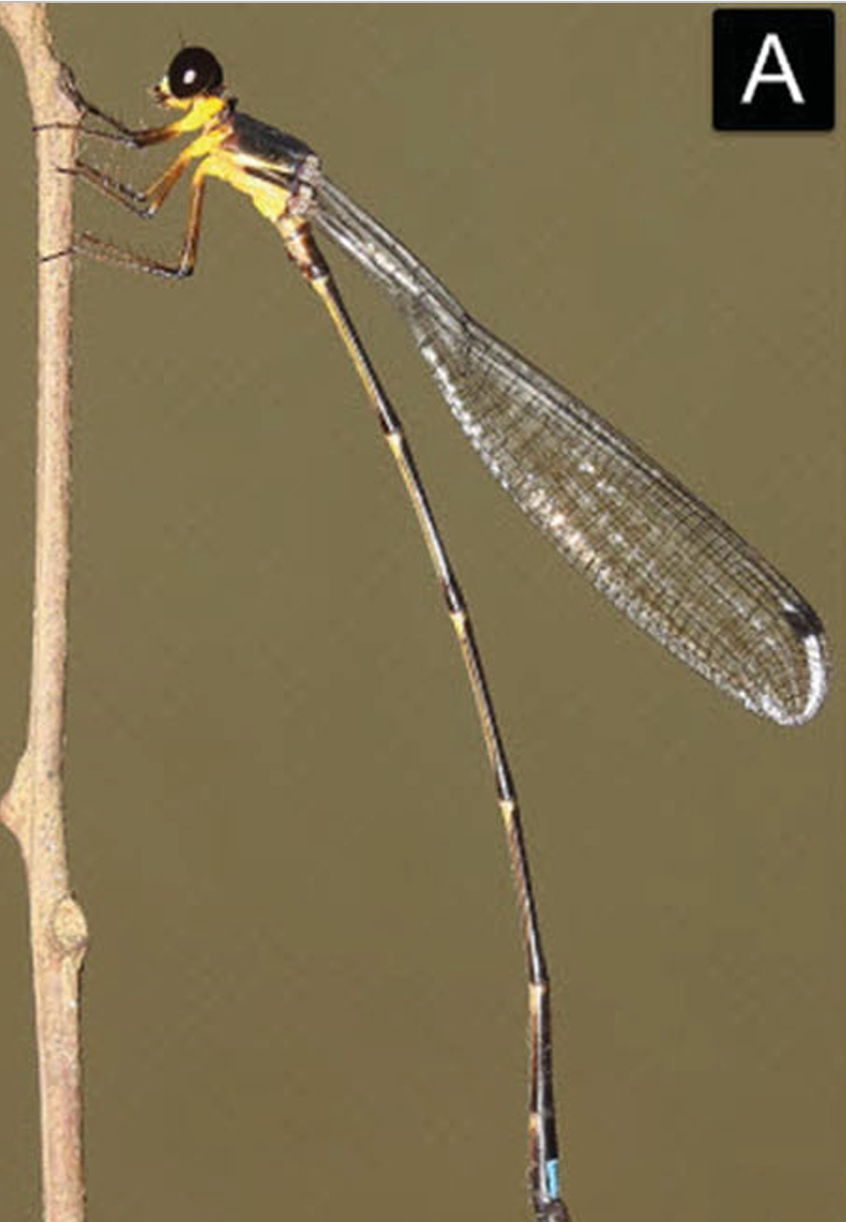

Scientific classification
- Kingdom: Animalia
- Phylum: Arthropoda
- Class: Insecta
- Order: Odonata
- Suborder: Zygoptera
- Family: Platystictidae
- Genus: Ceylonosticta
- Species: C. rupasinghe

Binomial name
- Ceylonosticta rupasinghe Priyadarshana, Wijewardana & Herath, 2016

= Ceylonosticta rupasinghe =

Species of damselfly

Ceylonosticta rupasinghe, or Rupasinghe's shadowdamsel, is a species of damselfly in the family Platystictidae. It is endemic to Sri Lanka, which was found recently from Samanala Nature Reserve, Ratnapura.

== Etymology ==
The species name rupasinghe was named as an honor for Professor Mahinda S. Rupasinghe, who is a geologist, and former vice-chancellor of Sabaragamuwa University of Sri Lanka.

== See also ==
- List of odonates of Sri Lanka
