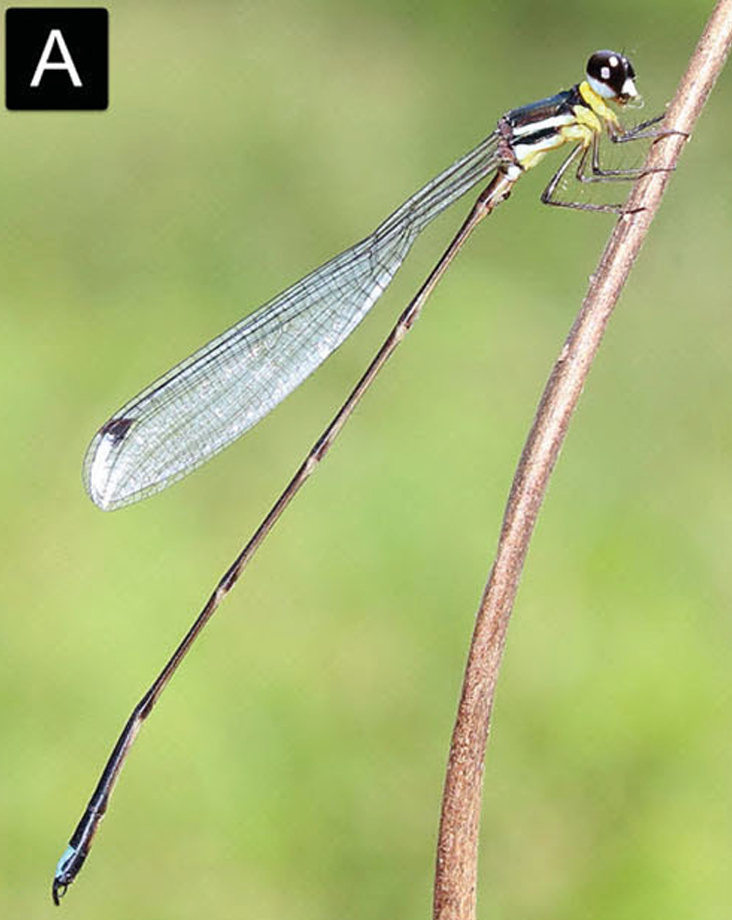

Scientific classification
- Kingdom: Animalia
- Phylum: Arthropoda
- Class: Insecta
- Order: Odonata
- Suborder: Zygoptera
- Family: Platystictidae
- Genus: Ceylonosticta
- Species: C. nancyae

Binomial name
- Ceylonosticta nancyae Priyadarshana, Wijewardana & Herath, 2016

= Ceylonosticta nancyae =

Species of damselfly

Ceylanosticta nancyae, or Nancy's shadowdamsel, is a species of damselfly in the family Platystictidae. It is endemic to Sri Lanka, which was found recently from Samanala Nature Reserve, Ratnapura.

== Etymology ==
The species name nancyae was named as an honor for Nancy van der Poorten, who is a renowned Sri Lanka odonatologist, and mentor of the research team.

== See also ==
- List of odonates of Sri Lanka
