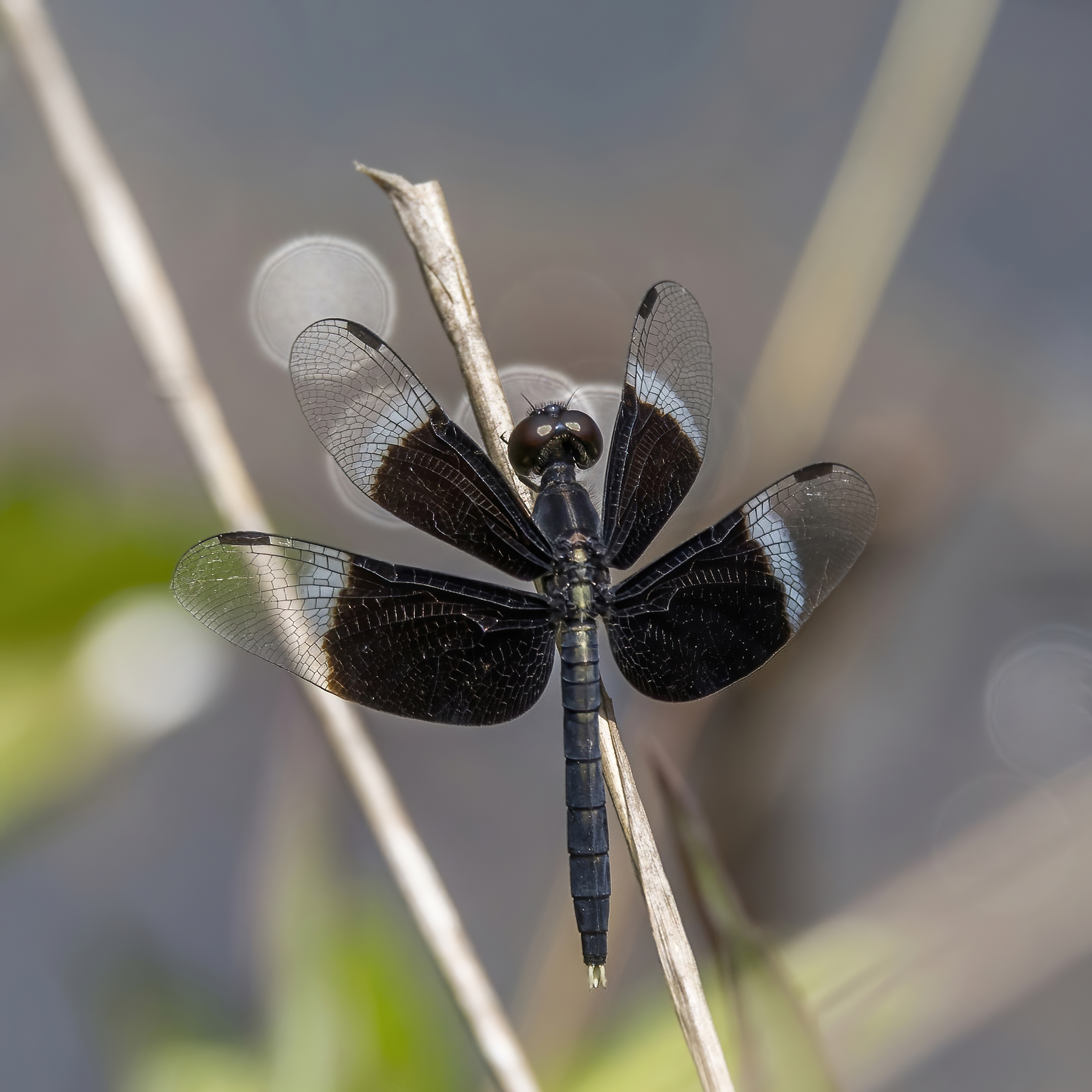
- Male
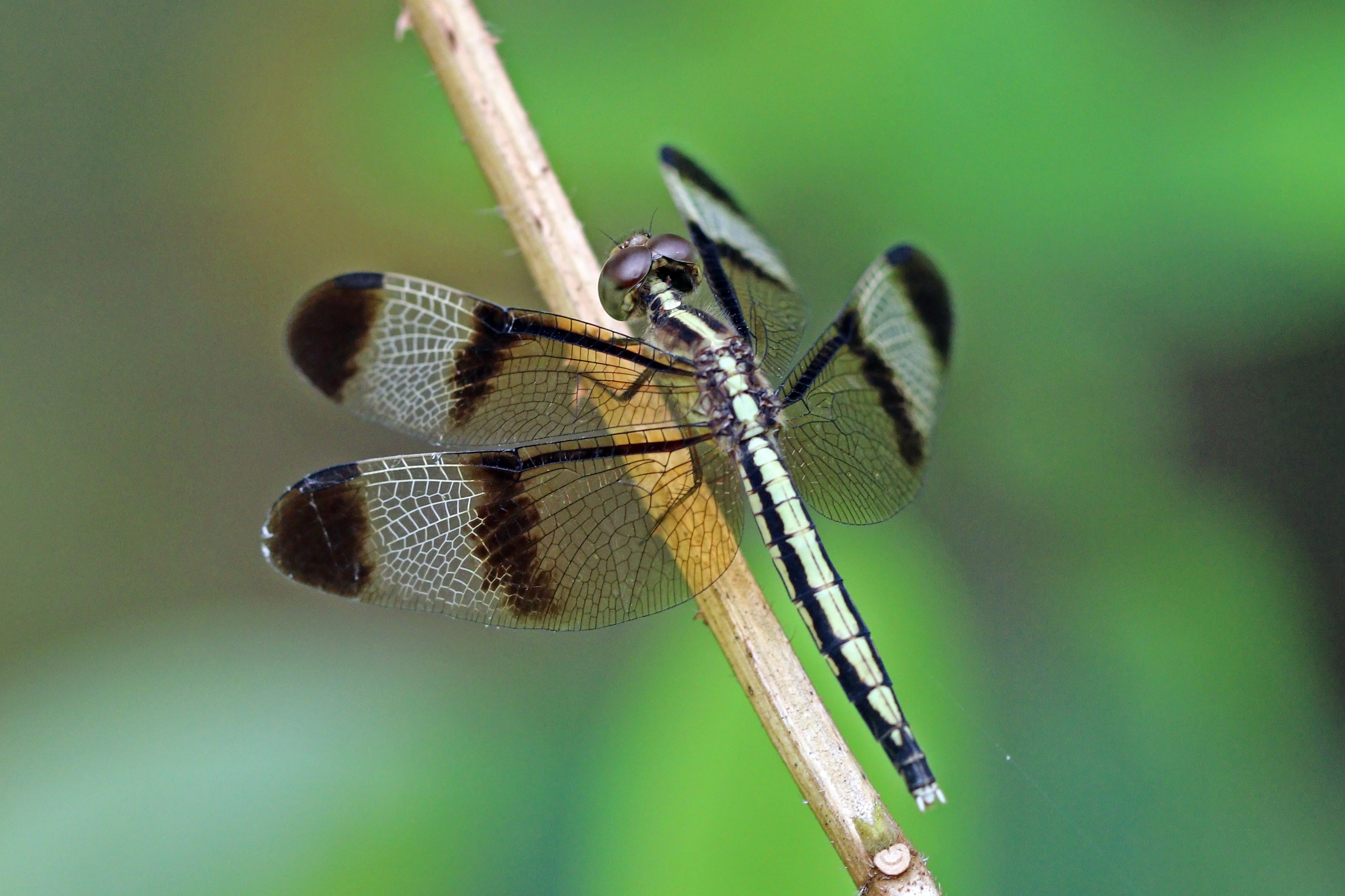
- Female

Conservation status
- Least Concern (IUCN 3.1)

Scientific classification
- Kingdom: Animalia
- Phylum: Arthropoda
- Clade: Pancrustacea
- Class: Insecta
- Order: Odonata
- Infraorder: Anisoptera
- Family: Libellulidae
- Genus: Neurothemis
- Species: N. tullia

Binomial name
- Neurothemis tullia (Drury, 1773)

Synonyms
- Libellula equestris Fabricius, 1781; Libellula lineata Fabricius, 1793

= Neurothemis tullia =

Pied paddy skimmer

Species of dragonfly

Neurothemis tullia, the pied paddy skimmer, is a species of dragonfly found in south and south-east Asia. It appears in Bangladesh, China, Hong Kong, India, Malaysia (Peninsular Malaysia), Myanmar, Nepal, Sri Lanka, Taiwan, Thailand, Cambodia and Viet Nam.

== Description and habitat ==
It is a black dragonfly with a pale yellow mid-dorsal carina of thorax. Wings are hyaline for apical half and opaque steely blue-black for basal half which is bordered by a milky white patch towards the tip. Females differ remarkably from the males both in body-colouring and markings and in marking of the wings. Its body is greenish yellow with a bright yellow mid-dorsal carina of thorax. Base of wings are amber yellow followed by a blackish brown patch. Apices of all wings are broadly opaque blackish brown and the remaining halves are pale yellow.

It breeds in marshes, well vegetated ponds, lakes and rice fields. It perches very close to ground and its flight is very weak.

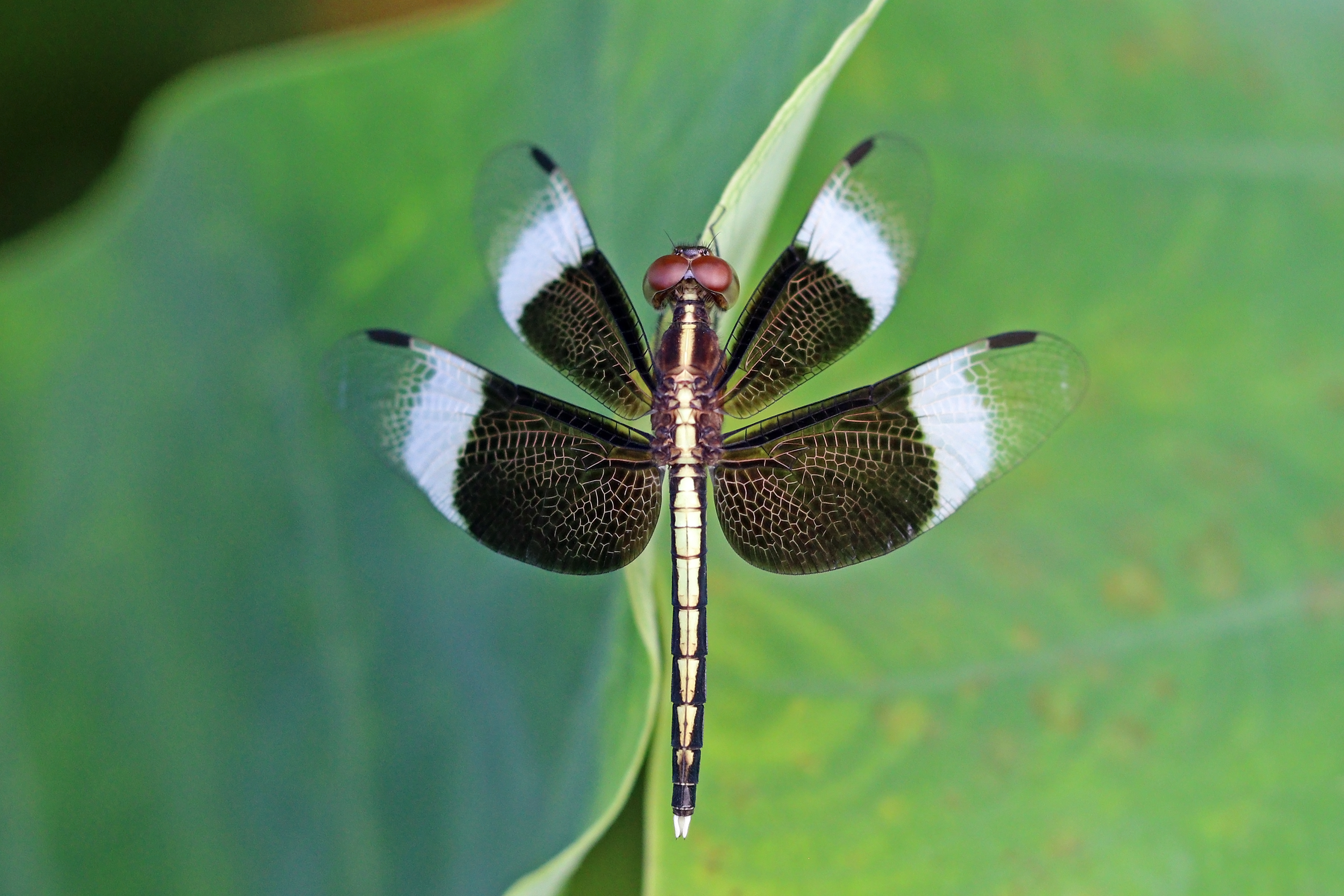
Young male

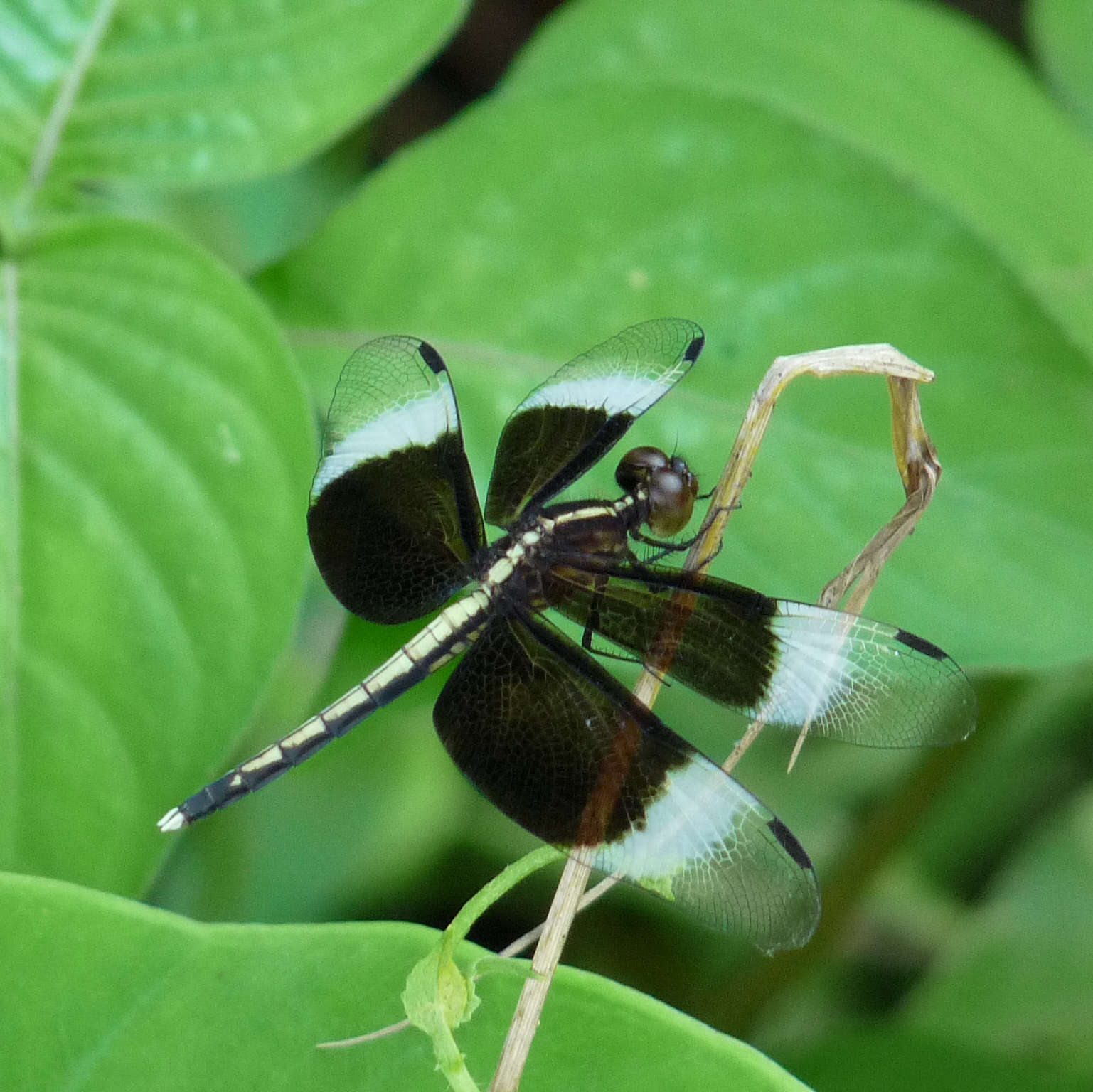
Male

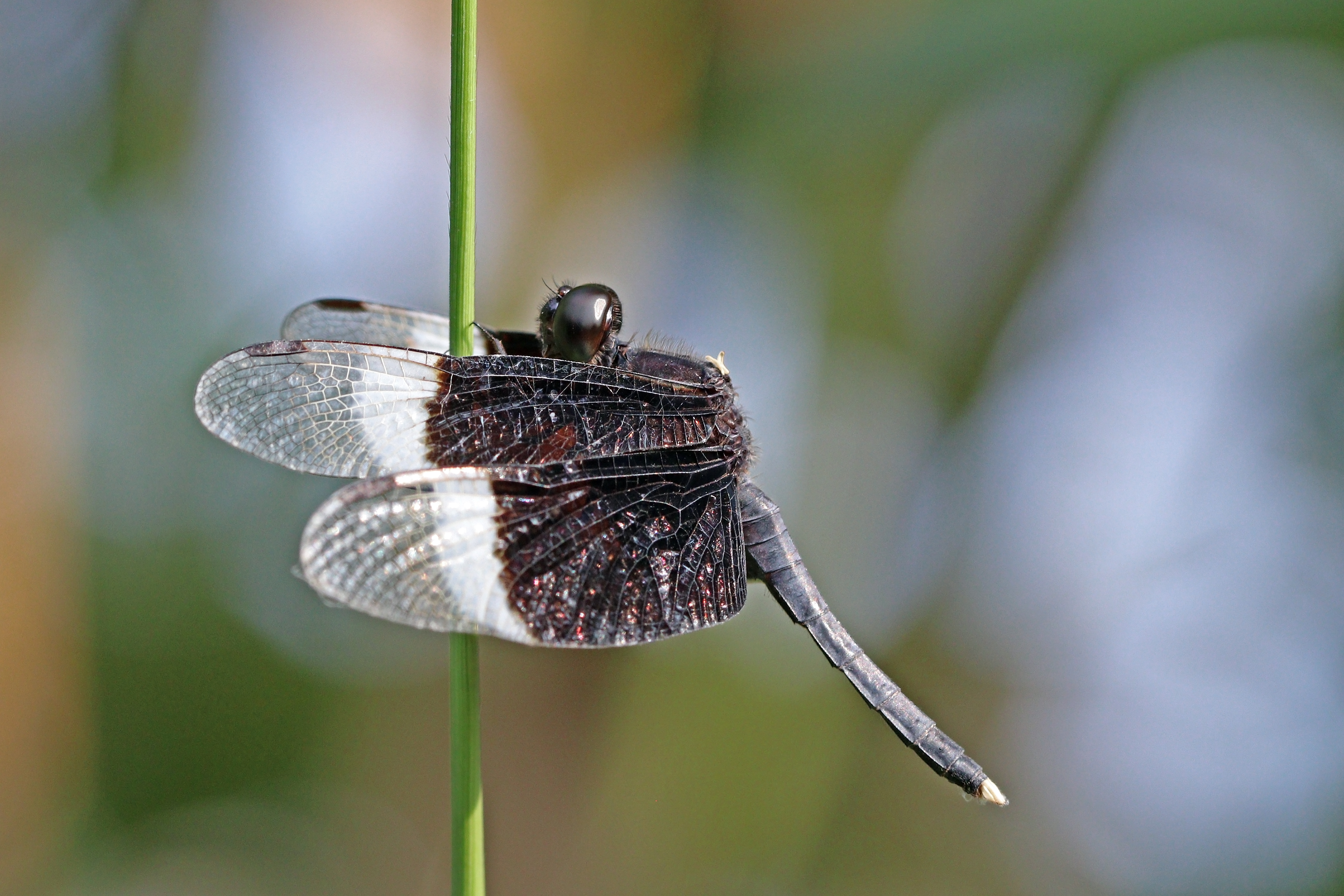
male

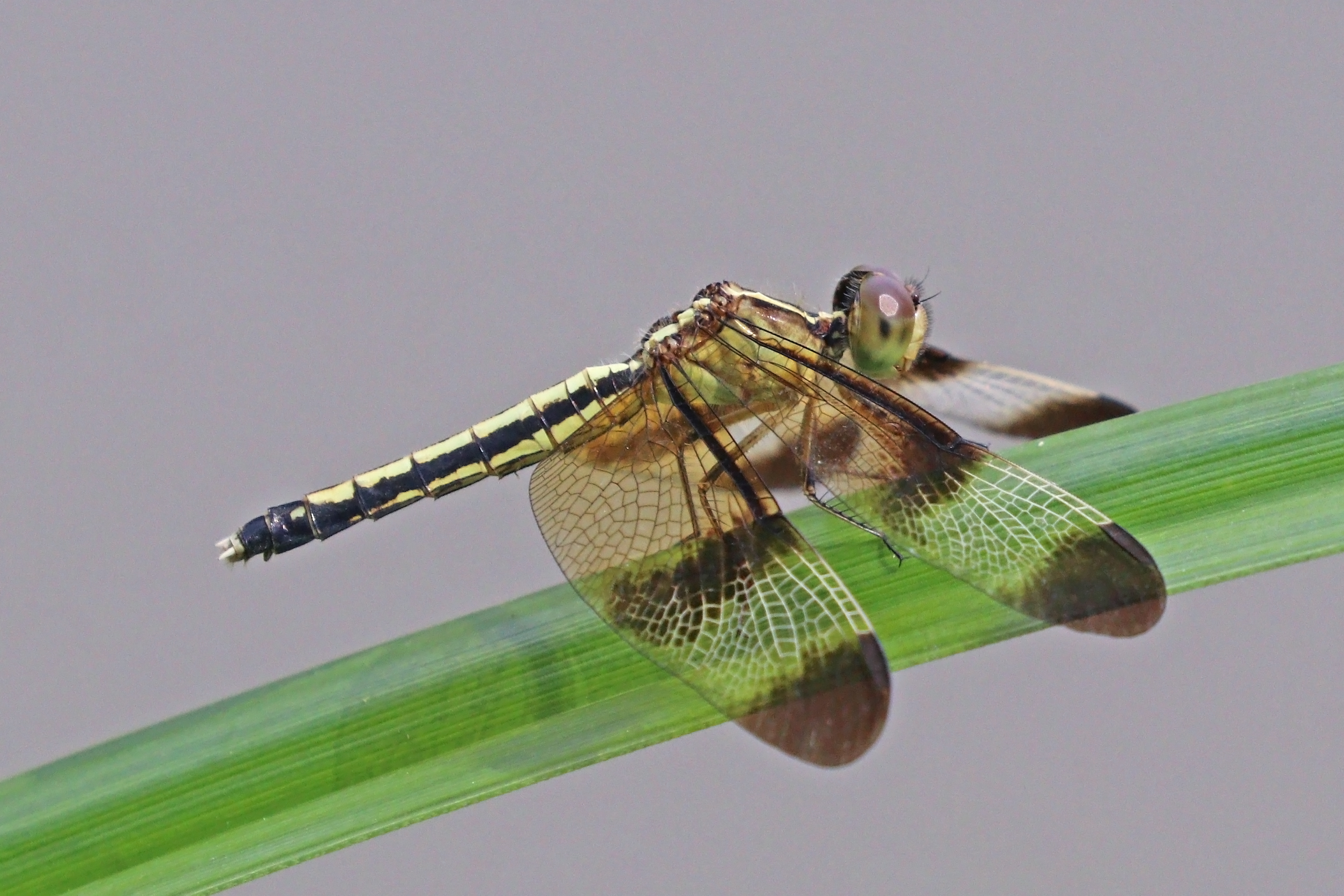
female

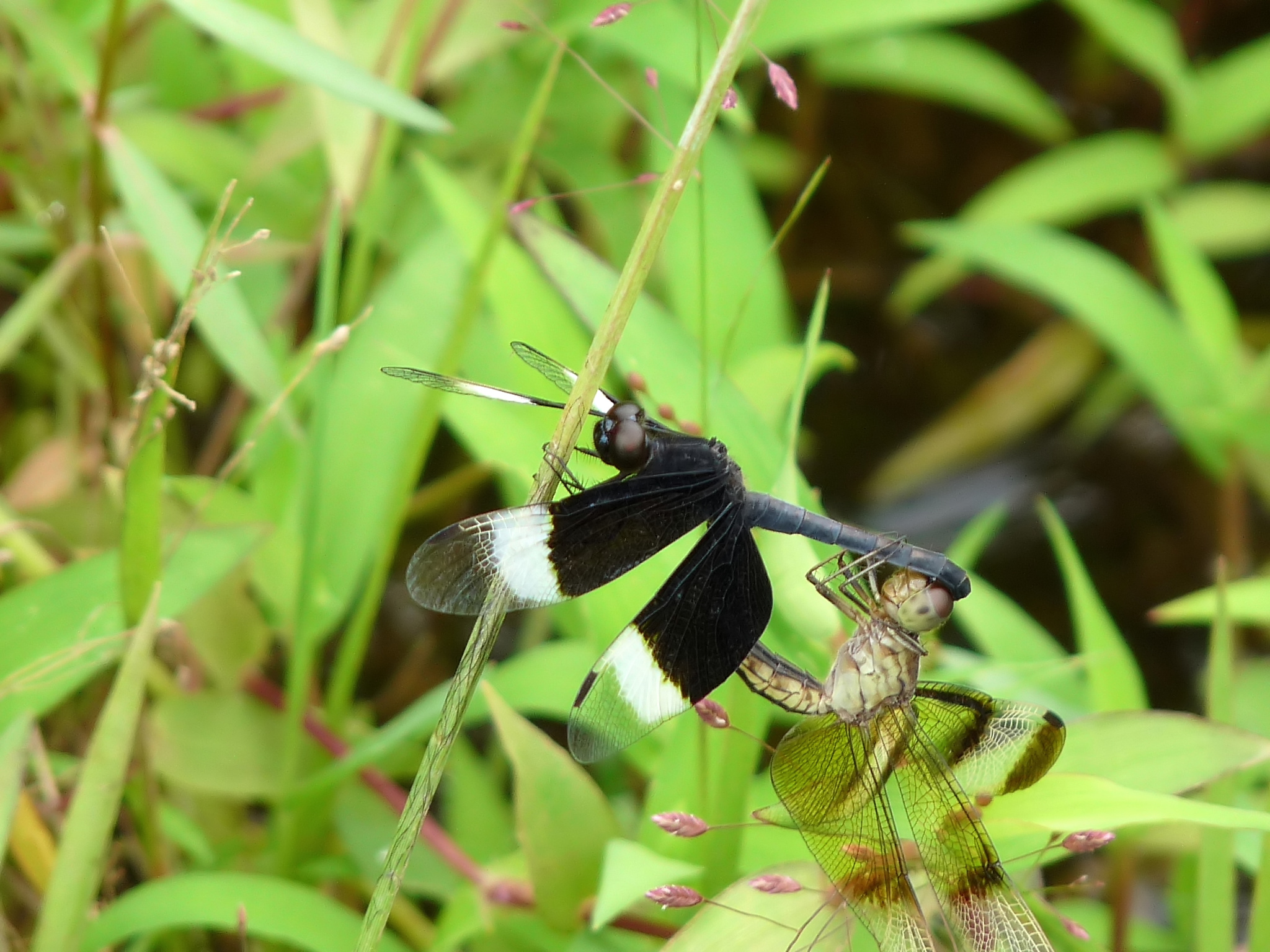
Mating pair

== See also ==
- List of odonates of Sri Lanka
- List of odonates of India
- List of odonata of Kerala
