= Ceylonosticta mirifica =

Scientific classification
- Domain: Eukaryota
- Kingdom: Animalia
- Phylum: Arthropoda
- Class: Insecta
- Order: Odonata
- Suborder: Zygoptera
- Family: Platystictidae
- Genus: Ceylonosticta
- Species: C. mirifica

Binomial name
- Ceylonosticta mirifica Bedjanic, 2016

Species of damselfly

Ceylonosticta mirifica is a species of damselfly in the family Platystictidae. It is endemic to Sri Lanka, found from primary forest on the road Uwella-Ratnapura area.

== See also ==
- List of odonates of Sri Lanka
