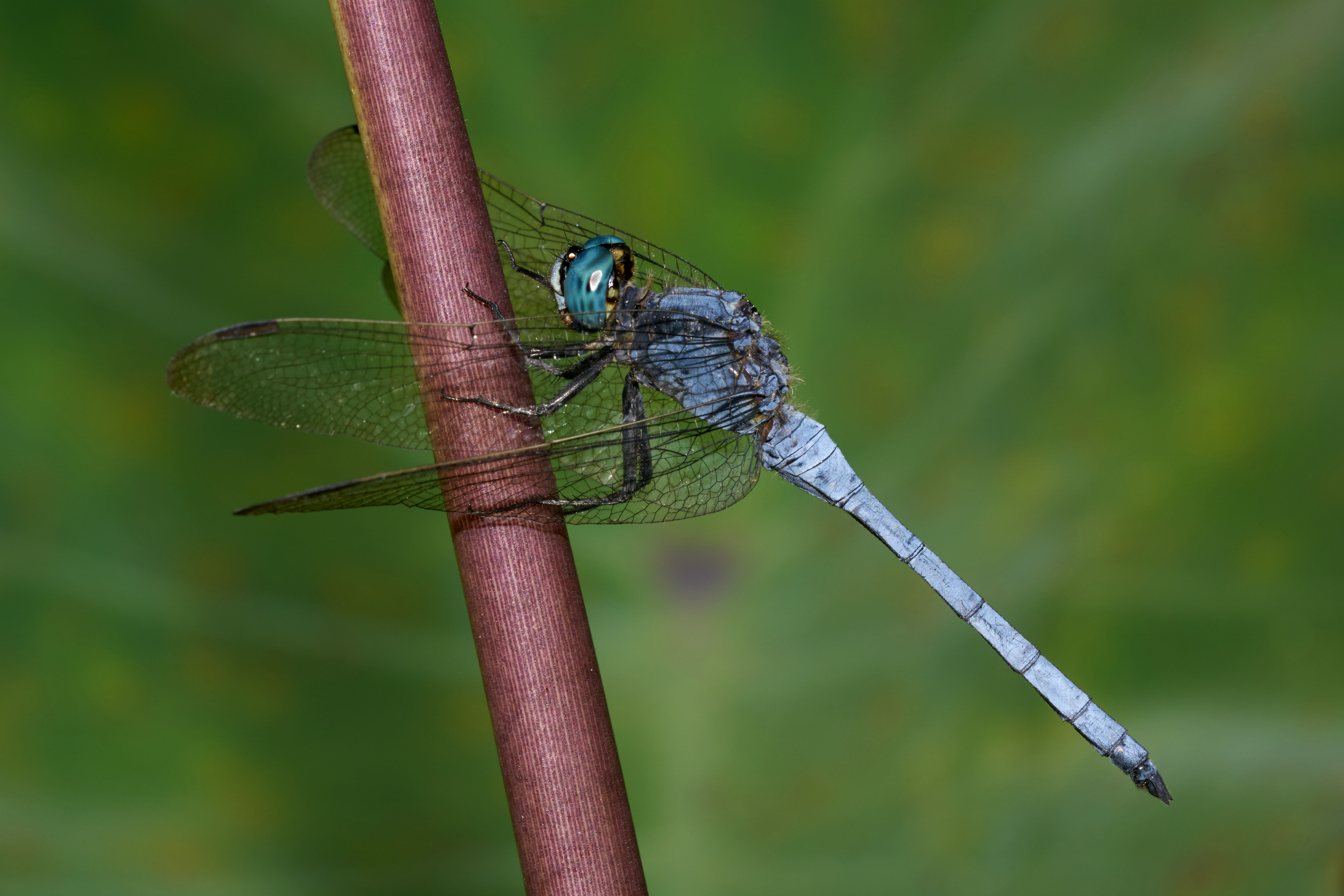
- male

Conservation status
- Least Concern (IUCN 3.1)

Scientific classification
- Kingdom: Animalia
- Phylum: Arthropoda
- Clade: Pancrustacea
- Class: Insecta
- Order: Odonata
- Infraorder: Anisoptera
- Family: Libellulidae
- Genus: Orthetrum
- Species: O. luzonicum

Binomial name
- Orthetrum luzonicum (Brauer, 1868)

= Orthetrum luzonicum =

Marsh Skimmer

Species of dragonfly

The marsh skimmer, also known as tricolored marsh hawk, and slender blue skimmer, (Orthetrum luzonicum) is a species of dragonfly in the family Libellulidae. It is widespread in many Asian countries.

== Description and habitat ==
It is a medium sized dragonfly with yellowish white face and blue eyes. Its thorax is yellowish green with some brown stripes. Its wings are transparent, including the base. Its abdomen is pruinosed with azure blue up to the last segments. In old adults, thorax will also get pruinosed, obscuring whole the marks. Females and young males are yellowish green. They breed in marshes and swampy areas in the plains.

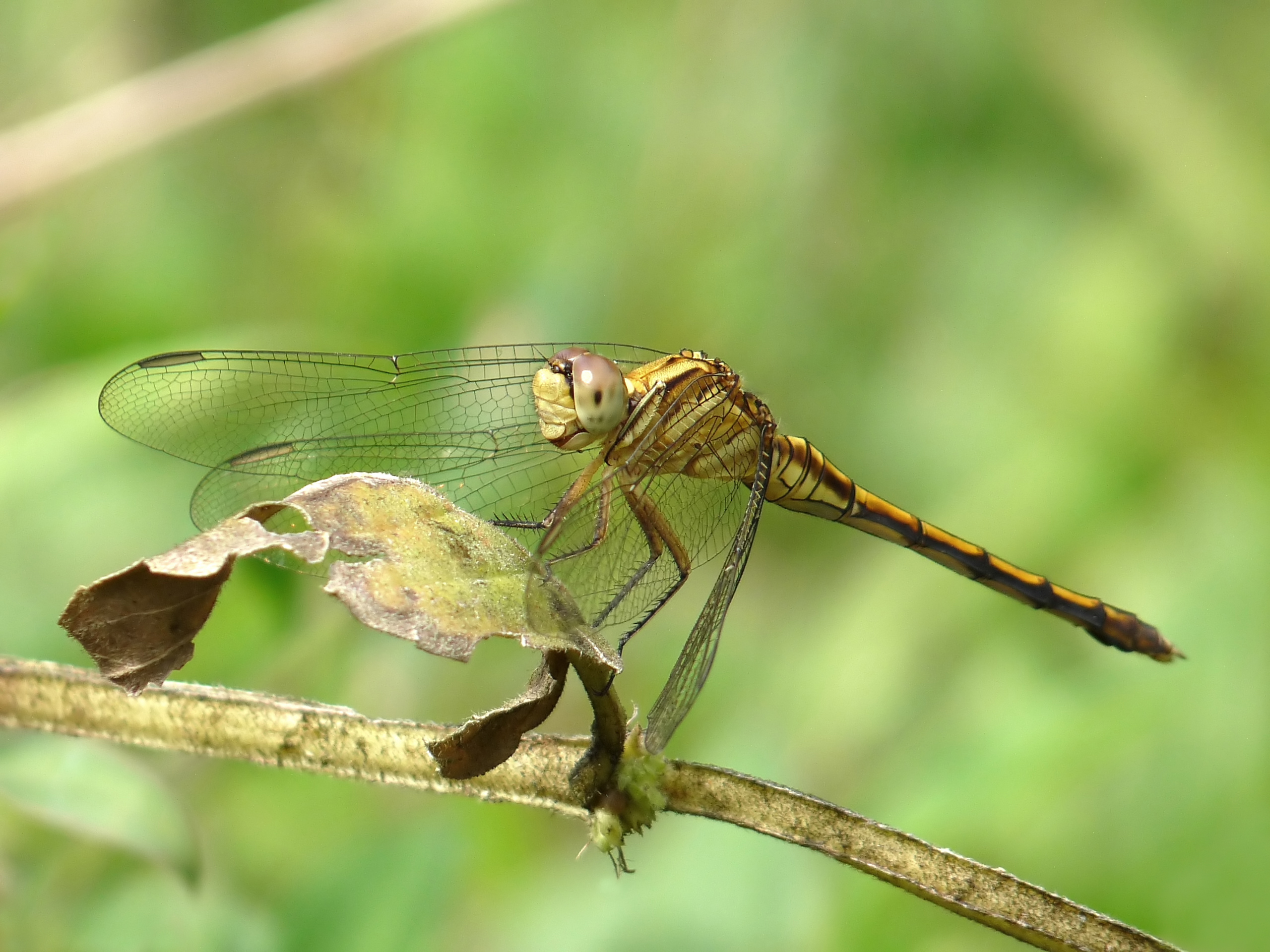
female

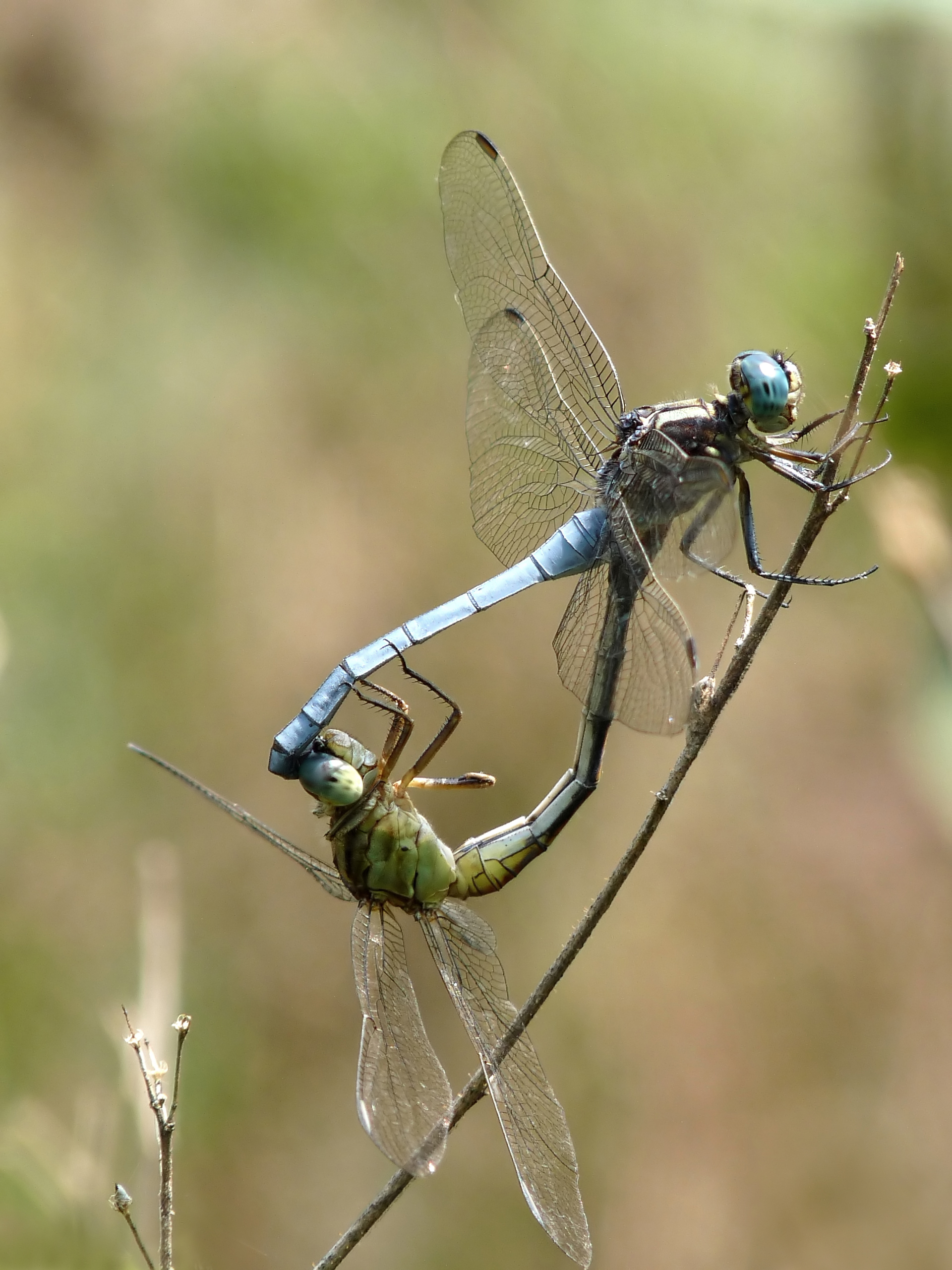
mating

== See also ==
- List of odonates of Sri Lanka
- List of odonates of India
- List of odonata of Kerala
