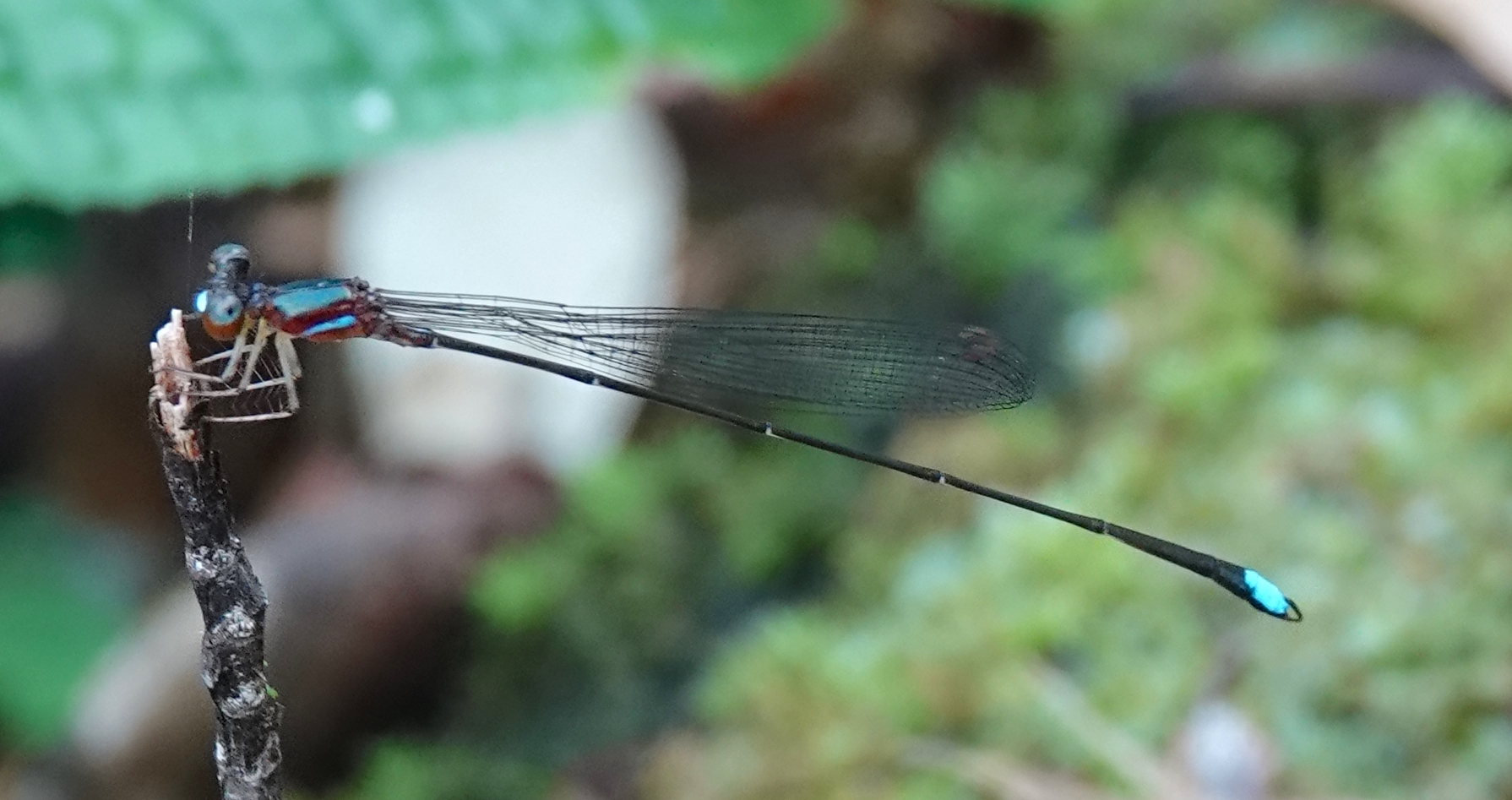

Scientific classification
- Kingdom: Animalia
- Phylum: Arthropoda
- Class: Insecta
- Order: Odonata
- Suborder: Zygoptera
- Family: Platystictidae
- Genus: Ceylonosticta
- Species: C. mojca

Binomial name
- Ceylonosticta mojca Bedjanic, 2010

= Ceylonosticta mojca =

Species of damselfly

Ceylonosticta mojca is a species of damselfly in the family Platystictidae, endemic to Sri Lanka.
