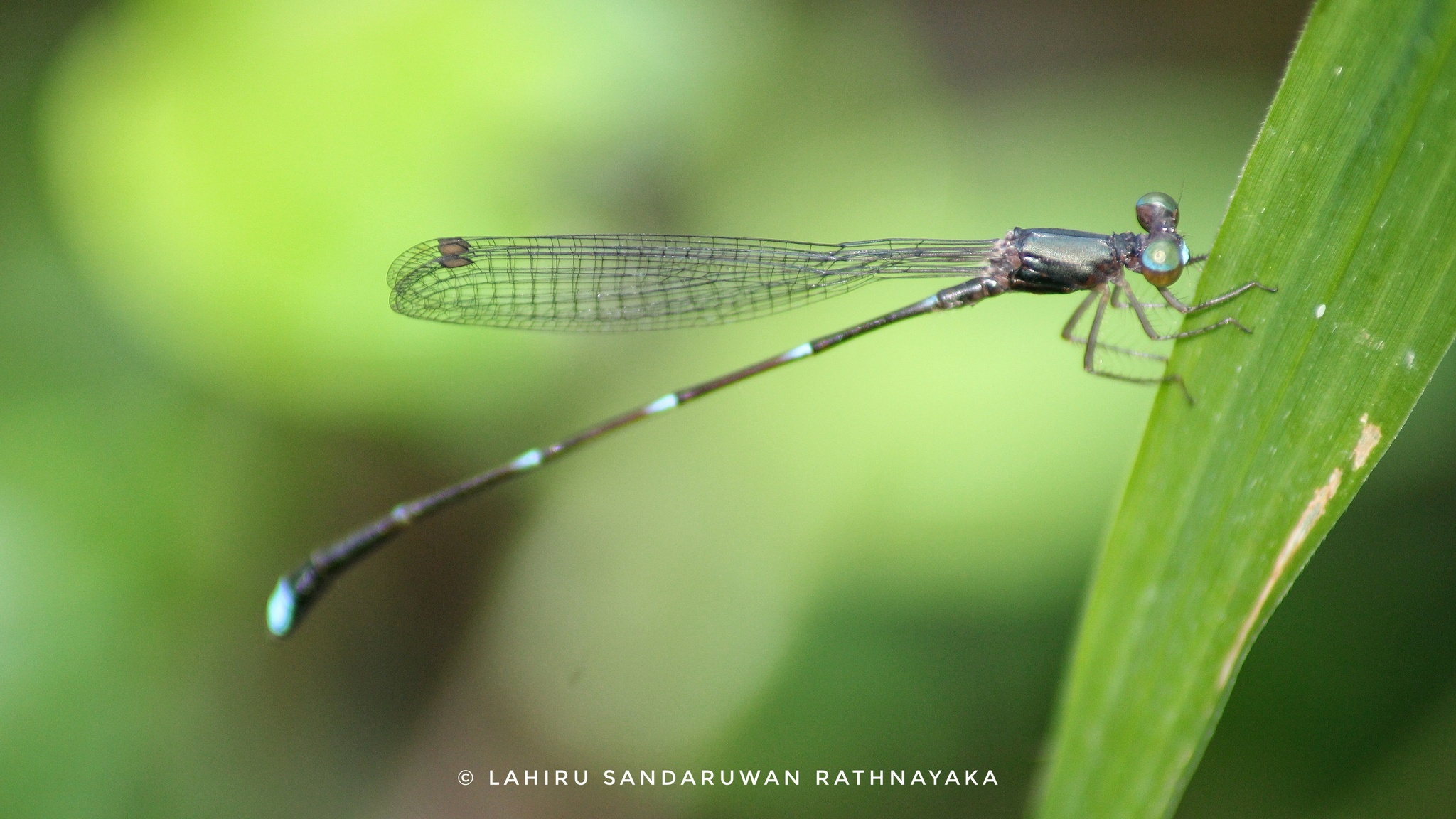

Scientific classification
- Kingdom: Animalia
- Phylum: Arthropoda
- Class: Insecta
- Order: Odonata
- Suborder: Zygoptera
- Family: Platystictidae
- Genus: Ceylonosticta
- Species: C. bine

Binomial name
- Ceylonosticta bine (Bedjanic, 2010)

= Ceylonosticta bine =

Species of damselfly

Ceylonosticta bine, or Bine's shadowdamsel, is a species of damselfly in the family Platystictidae. It is endemic to wet zone forests of Sri Lanka.
