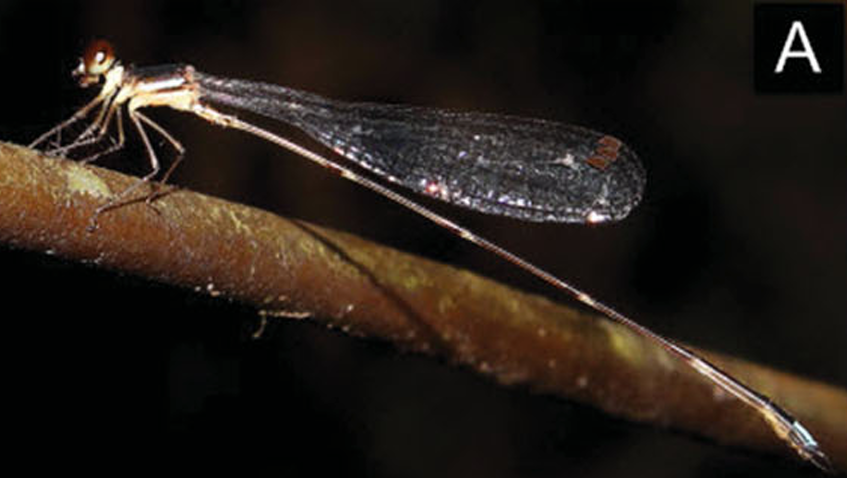
- Male
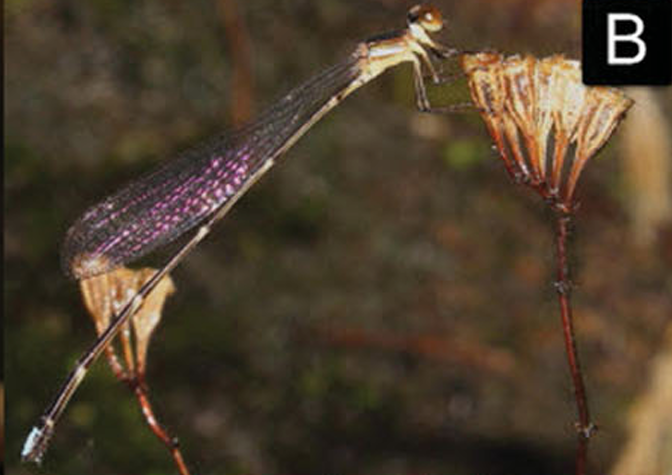
- Female

Scientific classification
- Kingdom: Animalia
- Phylum: Arthropoda
- Class: Insecta
- Order: Odonata
- Suborder: Zygoptera
- Family: Platystictidae
- Genus: Drepanosticta
- Species: D. subtropica

Binomial name
- Drepanosticta subtropica (Fraser, 1933)

= Drepanosticta subtropica =

Blue-shouldered cornuted shadowdamsel

Species of damselfly

Drepanosticta subtropica (blue-shouldered cornuted shadowdamsel) is a species of damselfly in the family Platystictidae. It is endemic to Sri Lanka. The species was recorded for the first time after 83 years, along with three new species from Samanala Nature Reserve.

== See also ==
- List of odonates of Sri Lanka
