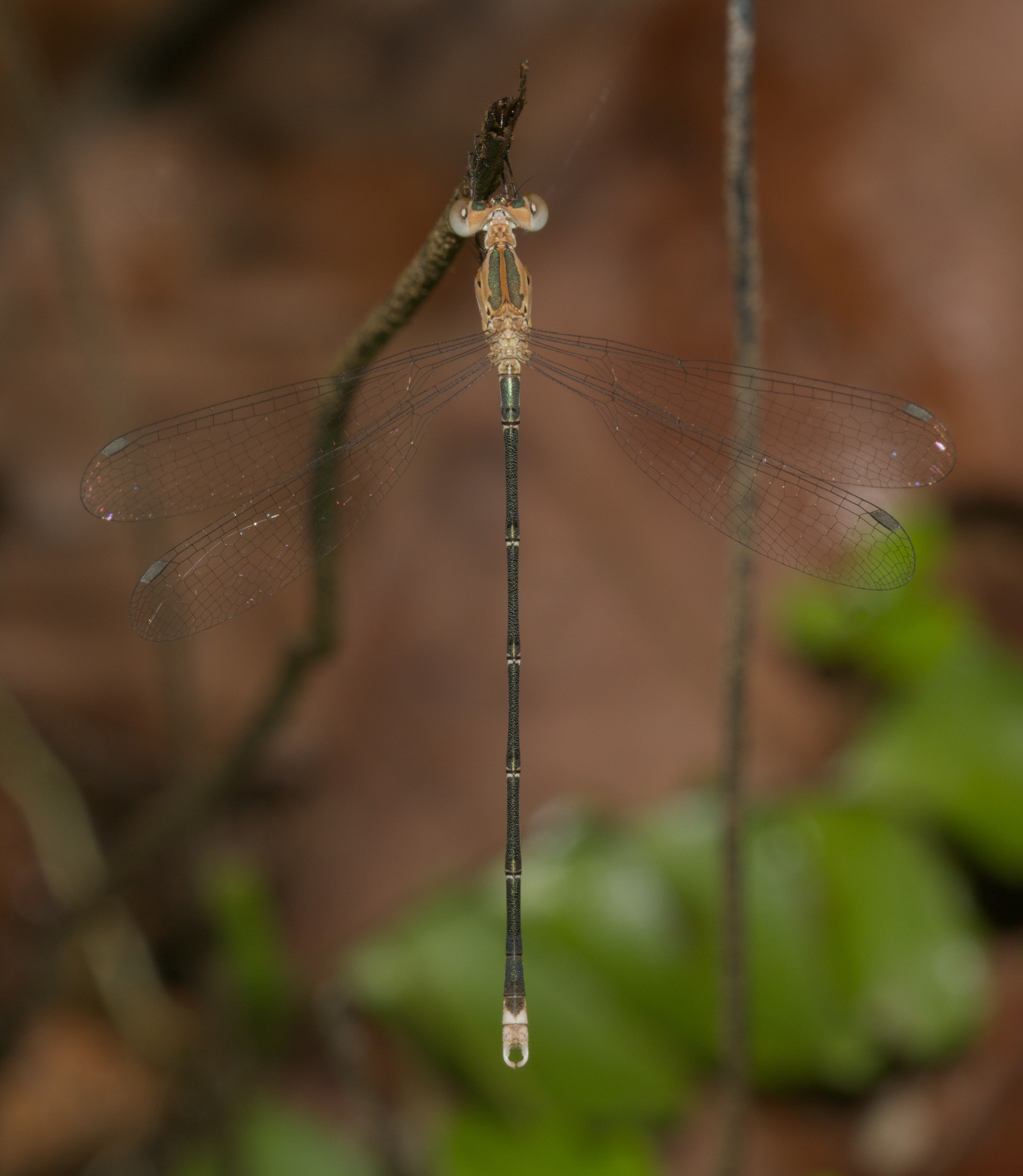
- Male
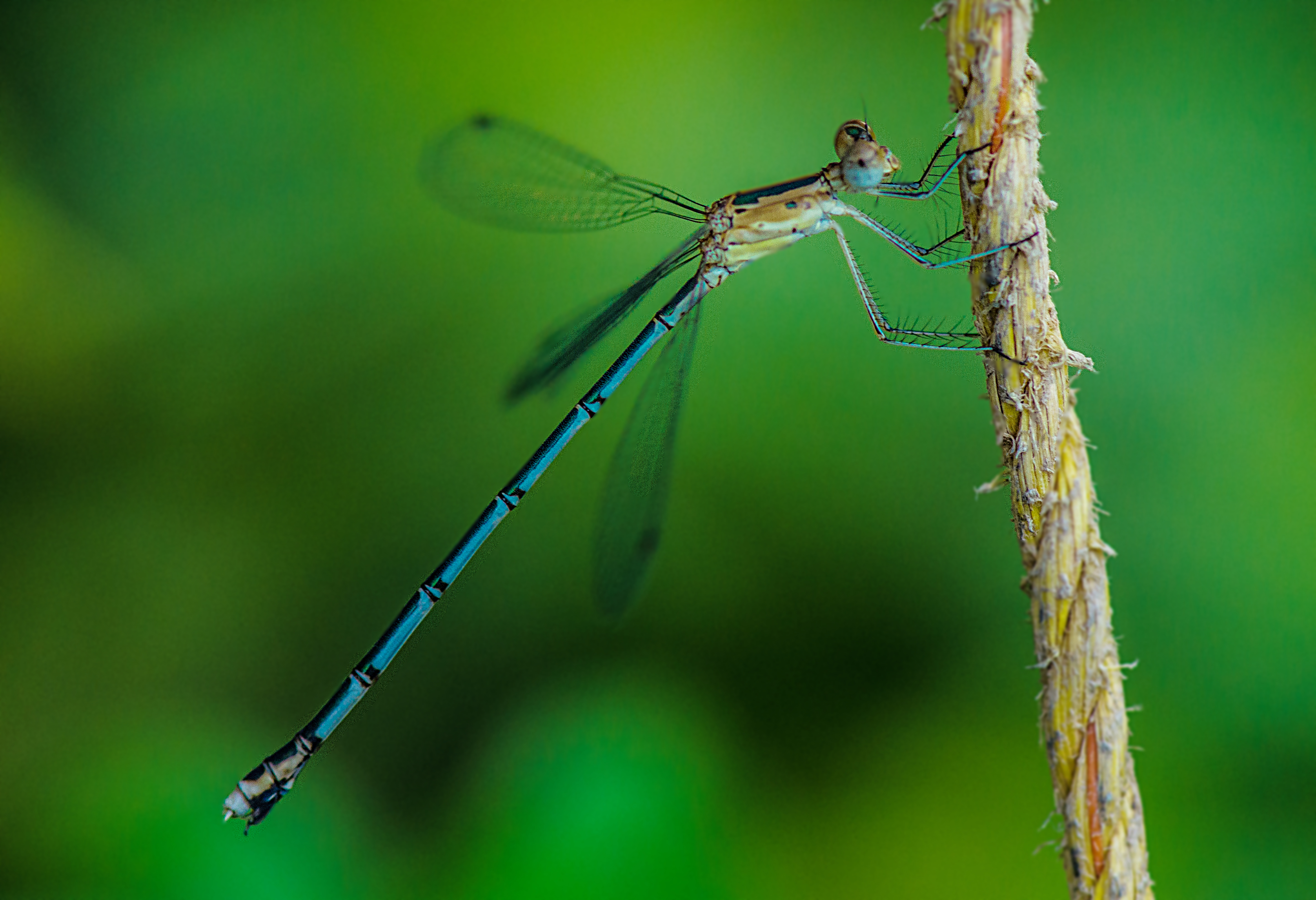
- Female

Conservation status
- Least Concern (IUCN 3.1)

Scientific classification
- Kingdom: Animalia
- Phylum: Arthropoda
- Class: Insecta
- Order: Odonata
- Suborder: Zygoptera
- Family: Lestidae
- Genus: Lestes
- Species: L. elatus

Binomial name
- Lestes elatus Hagen in Selys, 1862

= Lestes elatus =

Species of damselfly

Lestes elatus is a species of damselfly in the family Lestidae, the spreadwings. It is known commonly as the emerald spreadwing. It is native to India, Thailand and Sri Lanka.

== Description and habitat ==
It is a medium sized damselfly with greenish blue eyes. Thorax is brown on dorsum, changing to yellowish-brown on the sides. The dorsum of thorax is marked with a pair of narrow ante-humeral metallic green stripes expanded outwardly at the abdominal end like a hockey stick. There are three tiny black spots on the lateral sides. The brown color of the thorax will change to bluish-white due to pruinescence in adults. Its abdomen is pale yellowish brown at the sides in the young, marked broadly on dorsum with metallic green, up to segment 8. The basal half of segment 9 is black and the apical half is yellowish brown. Segment 10 is yellowish brown. The yellowish-brown color of the abdomen will change to bluish-white due to pruinescence in the adults. Anal appendages are creamy yellow, broadly tipped with black in the young; entirely black in the adults. It can be easily distinguished from other species of this genus by its unique metallic thoracic stripes.

Female is similar to the male and with less pruinescence.

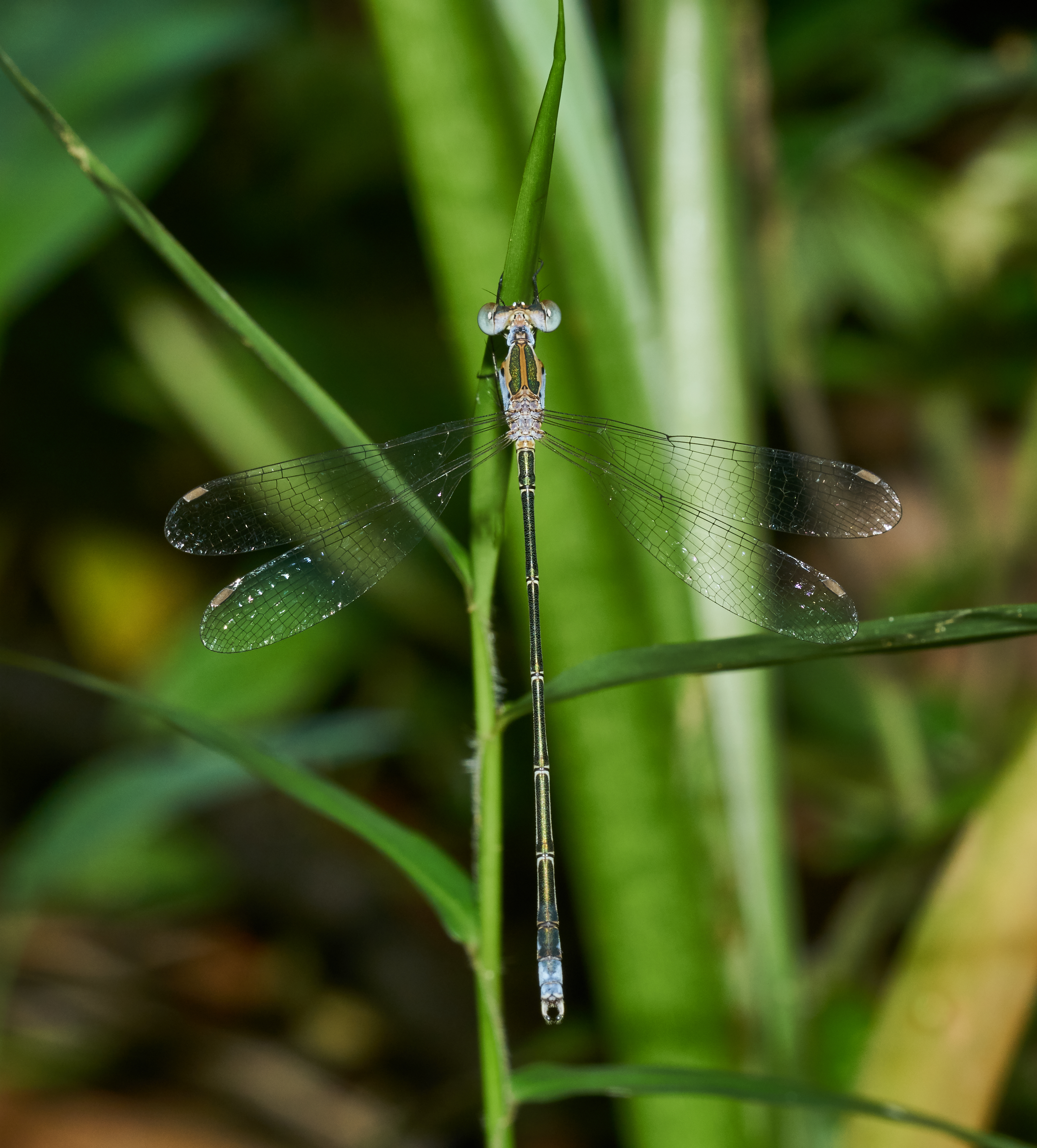
Adult male with pruinescence

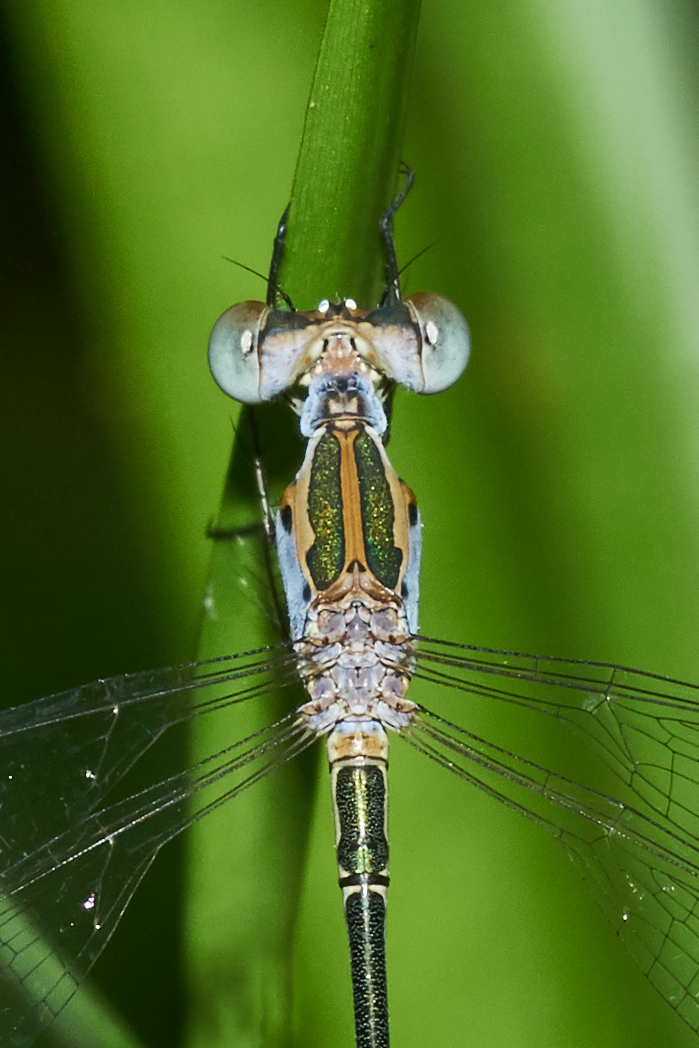
Hockey stick mark on the thorax

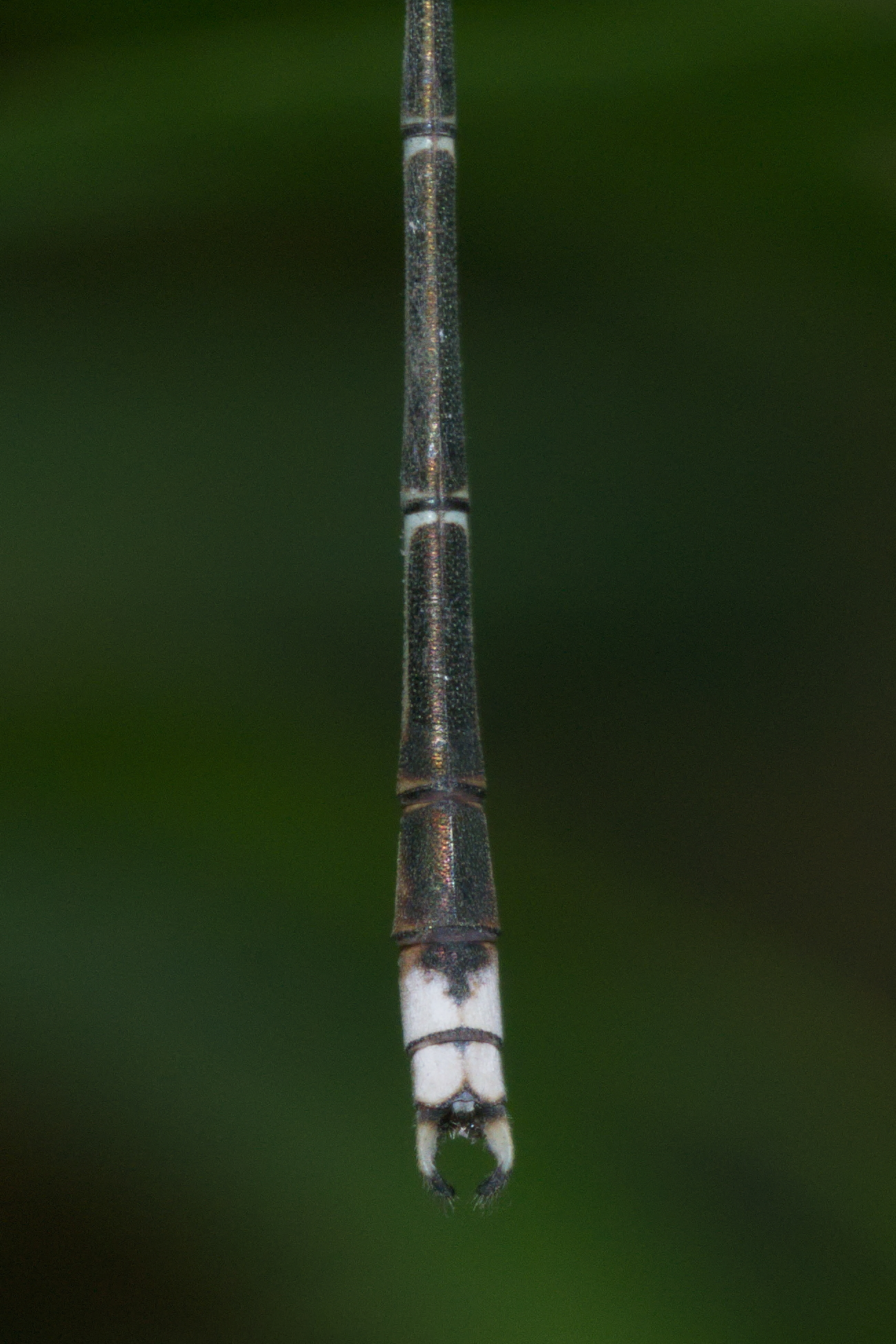
Anal appendages of the male

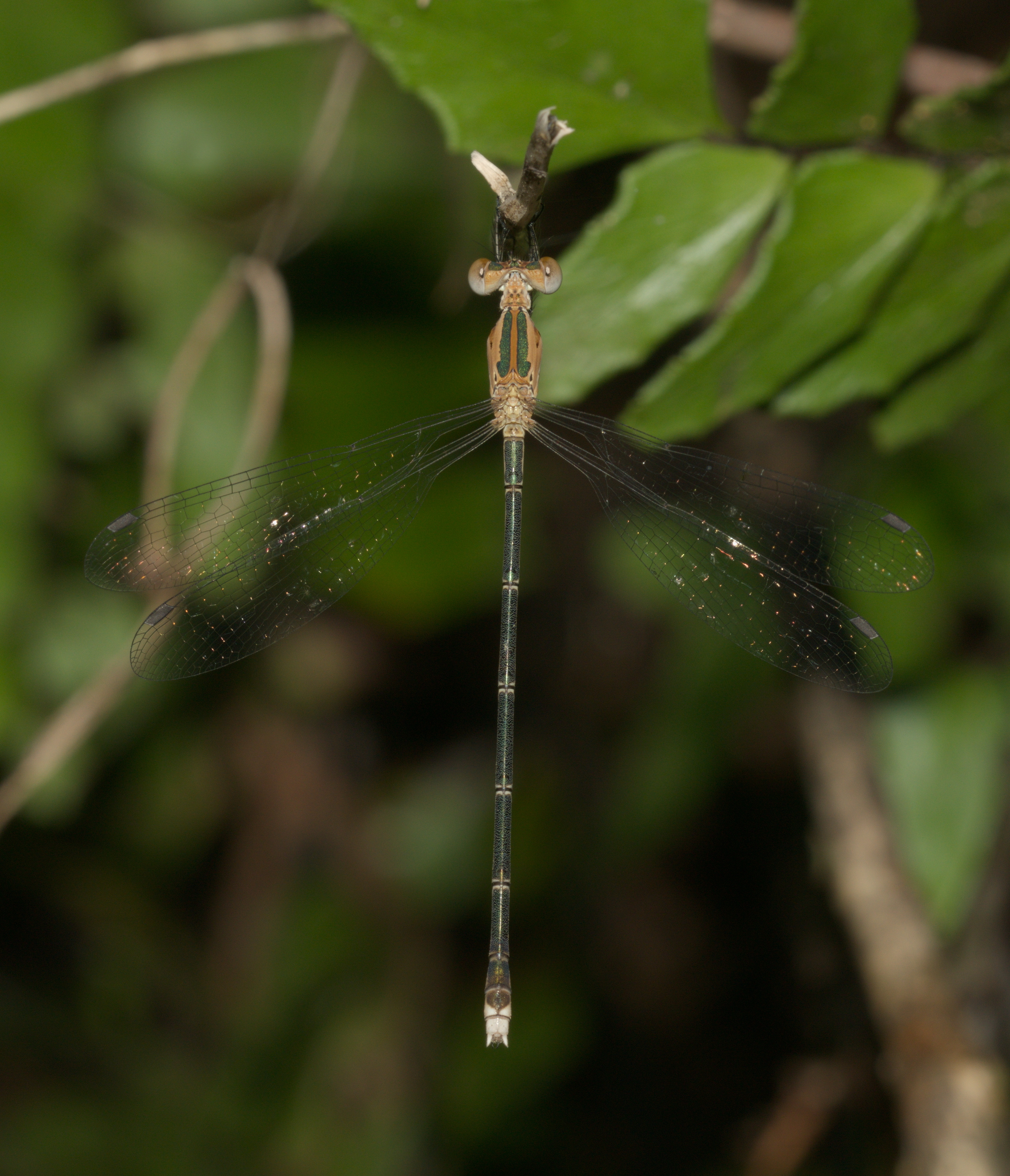
Female

It breeds in ponds, marshes and paddy fields in the plains.

== See also ==
- List of odonates of India
- List of odonates of Sri Lanka
- List of odonata of Kerala
