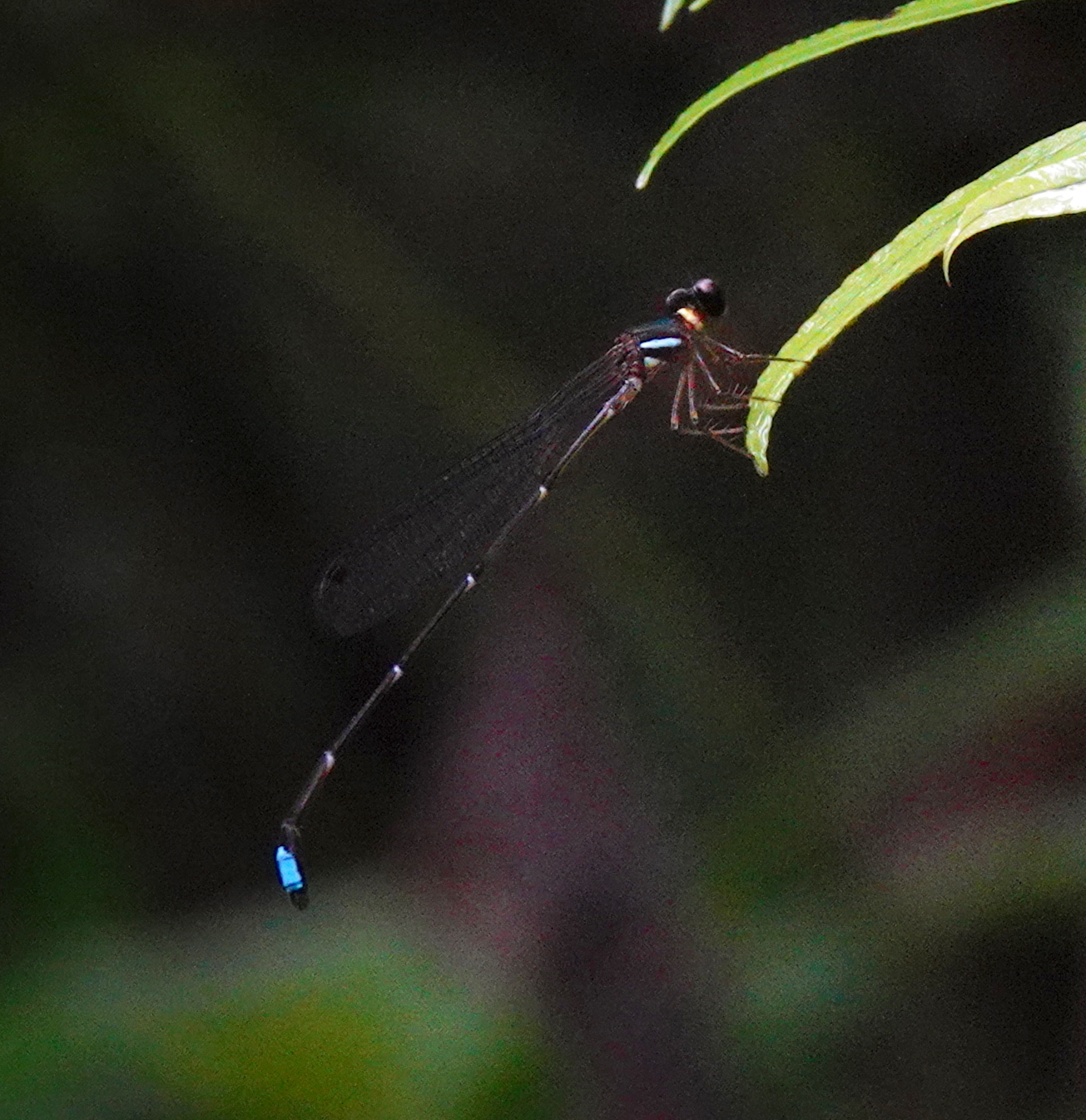

Scientific classification
- Kingdom: Animalia
- Phylum: Arthropoda
- Clade: Pancrustacea
- Class: Insecta
- Order: Odonata
- Suborder: Zygoptera
- Family: Platystictidae
- Genus: Ceylonosticta
- Species: C. anamia

Binomial name
- Ceylonosticta anamia (Bedjanic, 2010)

= Ceylonosticta anamia =

Species of damselfly

Ceylonosticta anamia, or Ana Mia's shadowdamsel, is a species of damselfly in the family Platystictidae. It is endemic to wet zone forests of Sri Lanka.

== Identification ==
The yellowish-orange prothorax is a key identifying feature of the species.
