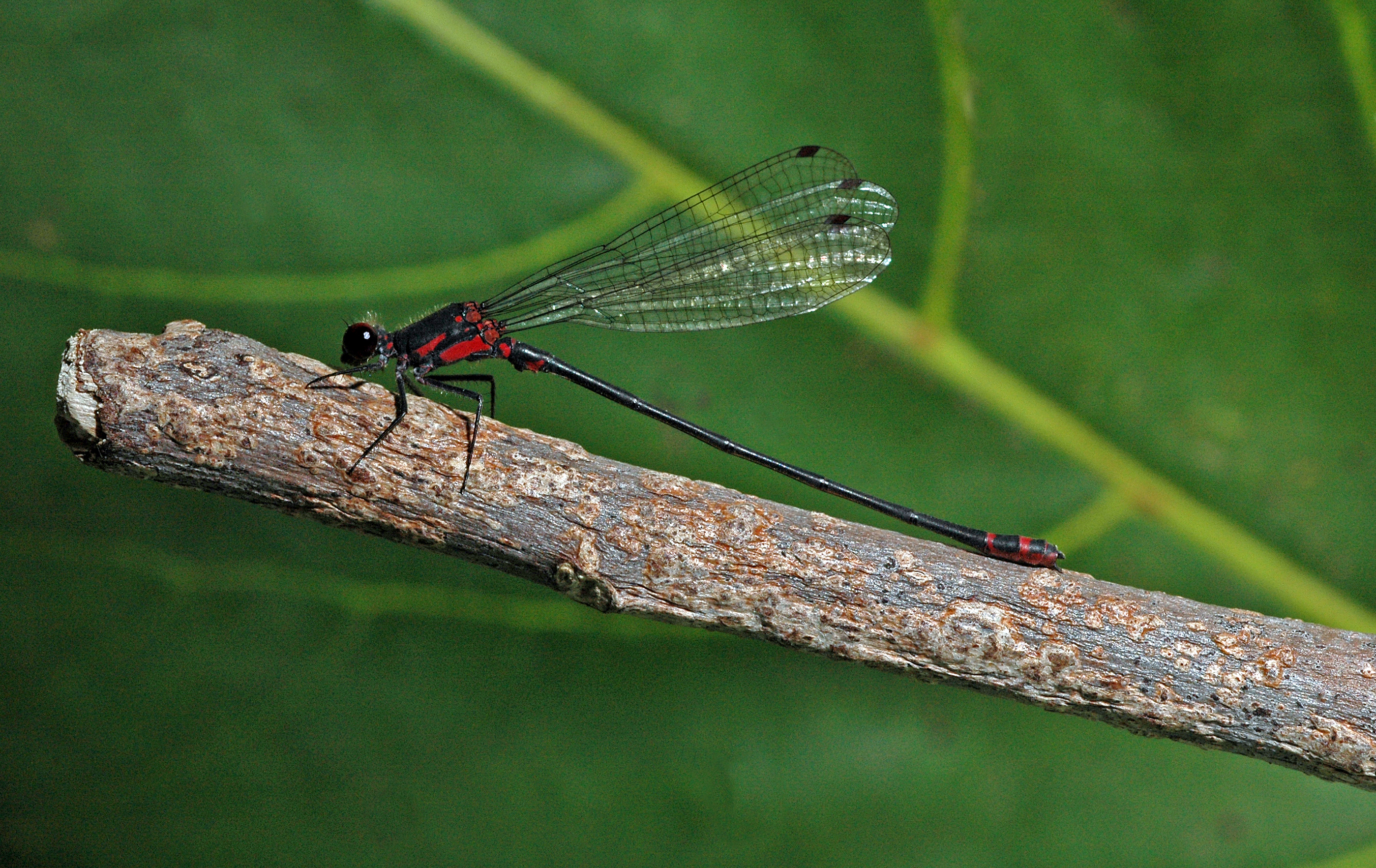
- Megalagrion pacificum

Scientific classification
- Kingdom: Animalia
- Phylum: Arthropoda
- Clade: Pancrustacea
- Class: Insecta
- Order: Odonata
- Suborder: Zygoptera
- Family: Coenagrionidae
- Genus: Megalagrion
- Species: M. pacificum

Binomial name
- Megalagrion pacificum (McLachlan, 1883)

= Megalagrion pacificum =

Megalagrion pacificum Pacific Hawaiian damselfly

Species of damselfly

The Pacific Hawaiian damselfly, Megalagrion pacificum, is a species of damselfly that is native to Hawaiian streams and wetlands at low elevations. They are predaceous and territorial narrow-winged damselflies that can be identified by their abdominal markings. In the last century, the populations of Pacific Hawaiian damselflies have decreased due to invasive species, habitat loss, climate change, stream alteration, and urban development. The species was listed as an endangered species under the Endangered Species Act on July 26, 2010.

== Description ==
The Megalagrion pacificum is a narrow-winged damselfly. They are weak fliers in comparison to other damselfly species. This is because of their tendency to fly only short distances over long periods of time. As adults, Pacific Hawaiian damselflies are roughly 3.3 to 3.8 cm (1.3 to 1.5 in) in length with a wingspan of 3.3 to 4.4 cm (1.3 to 1.7 in). Adult males and females are both darker in color but can be distinguished by markings on their thorax and abdominal segments. On males, these markings are brick-red while the markings on females are light green. Pacific Hawaiian damselflies are different from other Hawaiian damselflies because of the length of the lower abdominal appendages in the males. These appendages are visibly longer than the upper abdominal appendages, which helps with their identification.

== Life History ==
Pacific Hawaiian damselfly larvae are also called naiads. These naiads are found in the pools inhabited by the adult Pacific Hawaiian damselflies. During the larval stages, naiads survive under the surface of the water using three flattened abdominal gills. The larval stages of Pacific Hawaiian damselflies often last up to four months before maturity is reached. During this four-month period, naiads feed on small aquatic invertebrates or fish. Pacific Hawaiian naiads are often compared to the Orangeback Hawaiian (Megalagrion xanthomelas) naiads. This is because neither will travel to the surface of the water unless disturbed by predators.

After four months, Pacific Hawaiian damselflies will have almost reached maturity. At this point, almost-mature naiads will surface from the pools they developed in. They will climb onto rocks or vegetation bordering the pools. Once out of the water, they will undergo a molting process to reach full sexual maturity as a winged adult. At sexual maturity, these damselflies are about 3.3 to 3.8 cm (1.3 to 1.5 in) long. It is unlikely that these newly developed damselflies will travel far from the pools where they were born.

This species tends to breed in slow-moving water below 610 meters elevation (2,000 feet). Breeding areas include marshes, small seepage pools, and large ponds that are surrounded by vegetation. There is no current knowledge on the population trends, abundance, timing of reproduction, offspring quality and quantity, sex ratio, mortality, dormancy, and dispersal for the Pacific Hawaiian damselfly. However, researchers believe that this damselfly species could have lower genetic diversity due to low dispersal rates among Pacific Hawaiian damselfly. Surveys show that there are large distances between populations of this species which can cause interbreeding in a small geographic area.

== Ecology ==
=== Diet ===
The Pacific Hawaiian damselflies are predators as both adults and naiads. The species uses its long appendages to capture prey. Adult damselflies can also use their legs to catch prey while flying. Their diet is made up of arthropods, such as midges.

=== Behavior ===
Adult males of Pacific Hawaiian damselfly populations are extremely territorial. They will guard specific areas in Kalo (Colocasia esculenta) field pools where females lay eggs. When copulating, males will grip the females behind the head using their claspers to protect their females from other males. Males will also exhibit this behavior when females are laying eggs. This enables females to lay eggs in the most optimal areas for birthing. Since this occurs during copulation and egg-laying, Pacific Hawaiian damselflies often fly together.

The Pacific Hawaiian damselfly species have also managed to adapt to various ecological conditions, including areas with differing temperatures. Over many generations, the Pacific Hawaiian damselfly has become more resilient in different niches. This is due to their inability to travel long distances to avoid challenging ecological conditions. Despite significant changes in ecological conditions in different breeding niches, Pacific Hawaiian damselflies have managed to succeed. Studies have shown that the Pacific Hawaiian damselfly has high reproductive success in various niches.

=== Habitat ===
Due to their lack of flying strength, Pacific Hawaiian damselflies do not often fly far from specific habitats. They stay in their habitats, called pools, located in streams and wetlands. These pools border the main channel of streams in Kalo fields. It is rare that Pacific Hawaiian damselflies live on the main channels, as they prefer quieter, still water.

When outside of their pools, adult Pacific Hawaiian damselflies will rest on vegetation. Pacific Hawaiian damselflies prefer pool with dense vegetation for protection from predators. Pacific Hawaiian damselflies will only fly short distances away from their pool for two reasons: to escape from nearby disturbances and to return to the pool where they breed.

The preference for pool location in Kalo fields varies depending on the season. On a seasonal basis, reproductive success, avoidance of predators, and environmental conditions can change for these damselflies.

In the summer months, abandoned Kalo fields will experience droughts. These droughts cause the pools along the main channels to dry out. As a result, Pacific Hawaiian damselflies will move to different pools. Pools and side channels located closer to the lower course of the main channel are optimal during droughts.

In the winter months, abandoned Kalo fields will become flooded and marsh-like. In response, Pacific Hawaiian damselflies will then move back away from the main channel to avoid the high-impact flooding that occurs during this part of the season.

There is minimal information on historical population trends and demographic features of the Pacific Hawaiian damselfly.

=== Range ===
The Pacific Hawaiian damselfly has typically been found on all of the Hawaiian islands except for Kaho'olawe and Ni'ihau. There are approximately 26 populations of Pacific Hawaiian damselflies in Hawaii. These populations are found in Maui, Moloka'i, and Hawaiʻi; 18 populations are found on Maui, 7 populations are found on Moloka'i, and one population is found on Hawaiʻi. The 18 populations found in Maui live in 19 streams. They are less likely to live along main channels in these streams, as they are susceptible to nonnative fish introduction. Pacific Hawaiian damselflies inhabit contained ponds off of the main channel that are inaccessible to nonnative fish. The seven populations found on Moloka'i live in only a few streams. There are reports of non-invaded streams along the north coast of Moloka'i. There is a possibility that these streams hold more Pacific Hawaiian damselfly populations, but they have not yet been surveyed. The one population of Pacific Hawaiian damselfly on Hawaiʻi was last detected in 1998. There is no evidence showing that it is, or ever has been, a large damselfly population.

On their inhabited islands, the Pacific Hawaiian damselflies are found at lower elevations. Their preferred elevation level varies from about 0 to 381 meters (0 to 1,250 ft). There are cases where Pacific Hawaiian damselflies are found at elevations as high as 1,220 meters (4,000 feet). At these lower elevations there are streams and wetlands that are located in abandoned Kalo fields. Populations of Pacific Hawaiian damselflies are often in close proximity to one another because of the inability to travel long distances, limiting damselfly dispersal.

== Conservation ==
=== Population Size ===
Little is known about the specific population sizes of this species. Researchers have documented a decline in Pacific Hawaiian damselfly populations since 1905. This is likely as a result of the introduction of several nonnative species. One example includes the invasive Mexican molly (Poecilia mexicana). This nonnative species was introduced in Hawaii in 1984. Nonnative species such as this one are predators that threaten Pacific Hawaiian damselfly naiads. This threat comes mostly during the larval growth of naiads. There is correlation between the presence of nonnative fish predation and damselfly population decline. But, there are no calculations of how many Pacific Hawaiian damselflies currently exist. There are also no reports that show how many damselflies have existed historically.

=== Past and Current Geographical Distribution ===
In the past, Pacific Hawaiian damselflies were known to populate all of the main Hawaiian Islands at lower elevations, except Kaho'olawe and Ni'ihau. These populations would occur below 610 meters (2,000 feet) along streams. Since 1994, this species has been completely wiped out of Oahu, Kauai, and Lanai Islands. Today, fewer than six populations exist on the islands of Maui and Molokai. There are only a few across very specific ranges along seven streams in Molokai and 14 in Maui. Existing adult populations remain rooted close to these specific breeding areas along streams.

=== Major Threats ===
Humans introduced nonnative bullfrogs (Rana catesbeiana) to the Hawaiian Islands between 1940 and 1990. Bullfrogs are an additional threat to the Pacific Hawaiian Damselfly populations. This species of damselfly and bullfrogs both prefer habitats in calm water. Adult bullfrogs, and some tadpoles, feed on larvae and adult damselflies. Humans introduced another species of frog, Coqui frogs (Eleutherodactylus coqui) to the Hawaiian Islands in the 1980s. It is incredibly invasive and could begin to disrupt Pacific Hawaiian damselfly populations as well through predation.

Nonnative ants are another immediate threat to the naiads of Pacific Hawaiian damselflies. The damselfly larvae leave the water when becoming adults. Their life cycle overlaps with several species of predatory, aggressive, invasive ant species. These ant species prey upon the young adult damselflies. Some species of threatening ants on the Hawaiian Islands can live up to 610 meters (2,000 feet) in elevation. These species include the big-headed ant (Pheidole megalocephala), the long-legged ant (Anoplolepis gracilipes), the Argentine ant (Linepithema humile), and the Papuan thief ant (Solenopsis papuana).

Invasive aquatic insects, such as backswimmers (Notonectidae maculata), also threaten Pacific Hawaiian damselflies. They are predators of naiads in streams and calm water areas on almost all of the Hawaiian Islands.

The State Water Code of Hawaii serves to protect all species and habitats within surface water. Unfortunately, this code is not well enforced or followed by the people of Hawaii. The government is not controlling the transfer of nonnative species between island water sources. The lack of governmental enforcement serves as another threat to populations of Pacific Hawaiian damselfly.

Agricultural and urban expansion on the Hawaiian Islands have resulted in a 30% loss of Hawaiian wetlands. Historically, increased human expansion has threatened Hawaiian insects with habitat loss. The invasive grass (Urochloa mutica) grows along marshlands. The species converts marshes into grassy areas and changes habitats of the damselflies. In the mid-1900s, "amateur collectors" took samples of the damselfly species. Damselflies, butterflies, and dragonflies are the most popular insect species to collect. Researchers believe that this has also contributed to the reduction of Pacific Hawaiian damselflies.

Climate change, stream alteration, urban development, and stochastic events also disrupt the Pacific Hawaiian damselfly populations. The populations of this species are sensitive and small. Therefore, a large disruption, such as a hurricane, could wipe out the entire population. Overall, the major threats to this species are nonnative species, lack of governmental regulation, and human disruption.

=== Listing under the ESA ===
The Megalagrion pacificum was listed as an endangered species under the Endangered Species Act beginning on July 26, 2010. This species is considered endangered on the islands of Maui, Molokai, and Hawaii. The Pacific Hawaiian damselfly was first petitioned on May 11, 2004, to be listed under the Endangered Species Act.

=== 5-year Review ===
Initiation of the 5-year review was published on 1/22/2018. The 5-year review was published on 06/25/2021. No new information about the Pacific Hawaiian Damselfly was published in the 5-year review.

=== Species Status Assessment ===
There is currently no Species Status Assessment for this species.

=== Recovery Plan ===
The earliest delisting for the Pacific Hawaiian damselfly is expected to be 2051. The recovery plan was established on November 17, 2021, and has not yet been updated for this species.

In order to down-list the Pacific Hawaiian damselfly, three criteria need to be met. The first requires that all current populations of the species are found. Once found, they must be identified and considered evenly distributed as a population on at least one Hawaiian Island. On islands where the damselfly species historically existed, there should be at least 10 populations. Surveys should show that there is a consistent increase in all populations over five consecutive years or more. Next, all habitats in which the species is found need to be stable and supportive of breeding. This would include protections in place to prevent environmental disturbances that could decrease damselfly populations. Finally, these habitats need predation monitoring over five consecutive years. For three or more of these years, there need to be no nonnative predators, minimal predation, and minimal competition for the damselfly species. The major threats to the Pacific Hawaiian damselfly populations need to be stabilized or removed for the species to be down-listed.

To delist the Pacific Hawaiian Damselfly from the Endangered Species List, three additional criteria (including those listed above) must be met. Significant increases in the abundance of the species across all islands (Kaua'i, O'ahu, Moloka'i, Lana'i, Maui, and Hawaiʻi) must occur over 10 years. Strong increases in the population need to occur for at least 7 of the 10 years. Additionally, damselfly populations need to continue to breed and sustain themselves. Damselfly breeding must occur successfully on a repetitive basis. These populations of damselfly must, then, be able to withstand ecosystem disturbances. Finally, nonnative species need to be absent from these habitats. No significant predation or competition rates should harm damselfly populations. If these criteria are met, the Pacific Hawaiian damselfly can be delisted from the Endangered Species List.

There are other suggestions for the recovery of this species. One suggestion includes using surveys to better determine distribution and population sizes. These surveys could also be used to stabilize the existing population of Pacific Hawaiian damselfly. Additionally, the U.S. Fish and Wildlife Services suggests focusing on nonnative predator management, documentation, surveying, studying, and extermination. The U.S. Fish and Wildlife Services also suggests studying the habitat requirements of the Pacific Hawaiian Damselfly. Depending on the habitat needs of the species, it may be possible to transport them to other areas with human intervention. New, suitable locations might provide habitats for growth and population restoration.
