= Punaluʻu Beach =

Black Sand Beach, Big Island, Hawaii, US

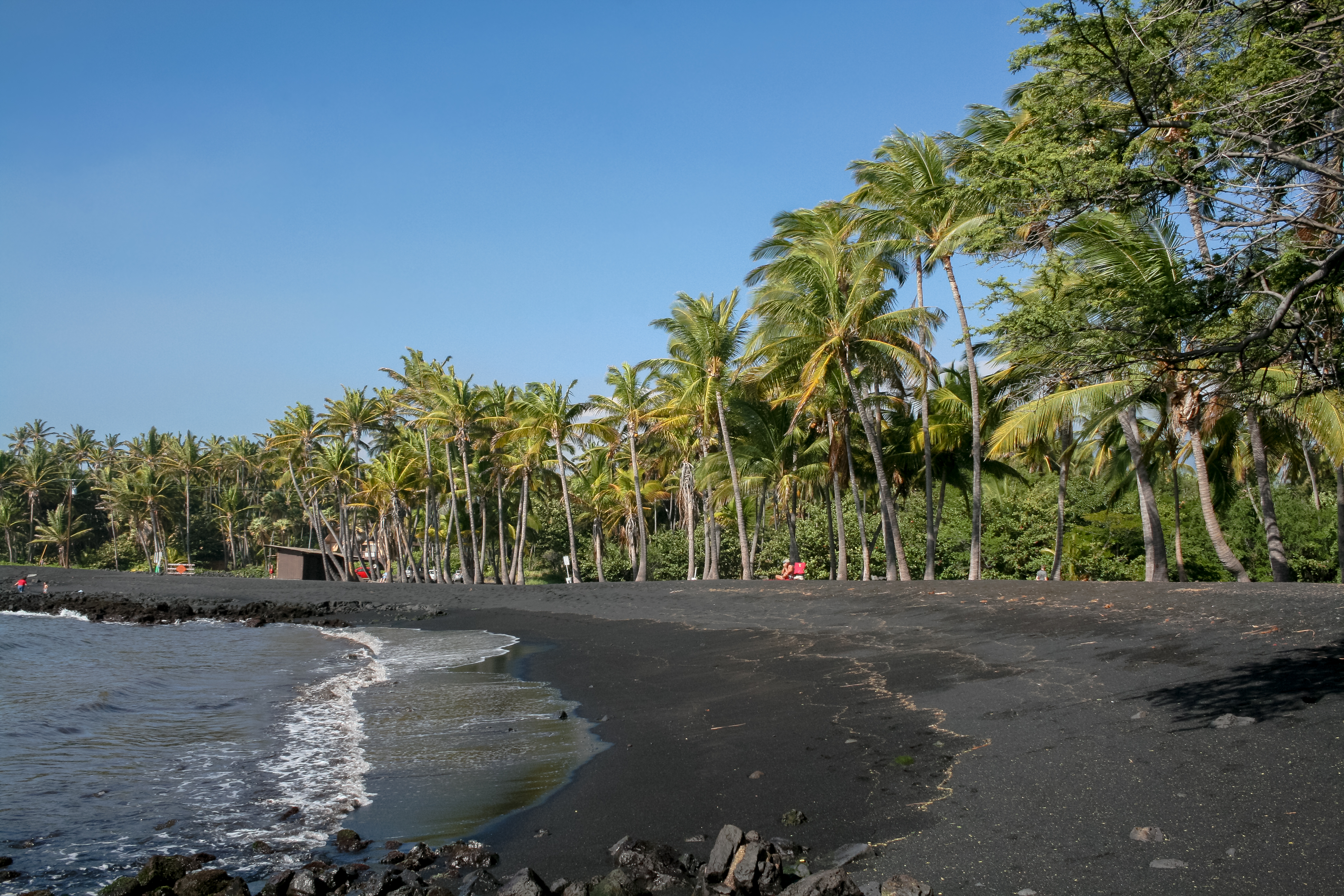
View of the beach

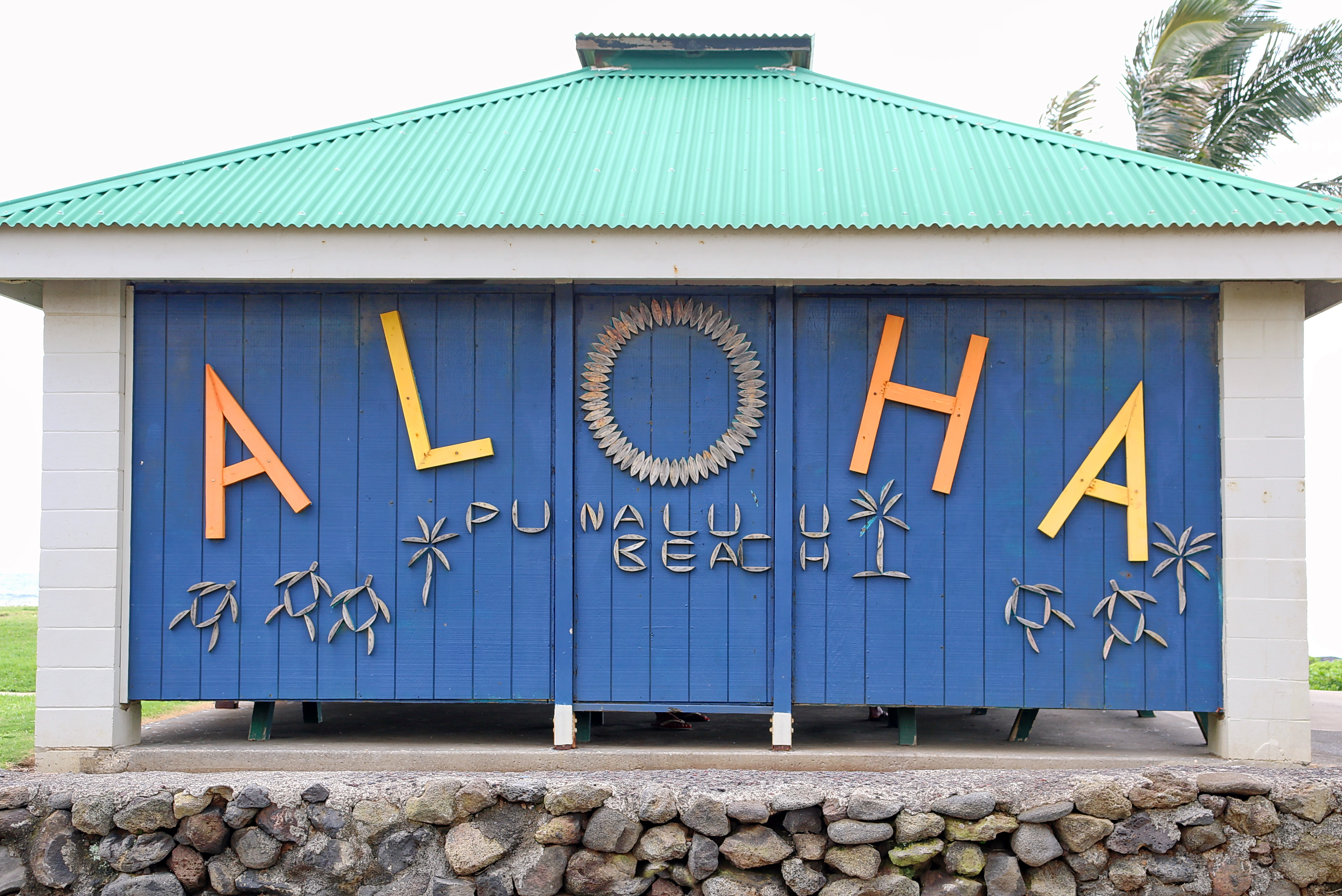
Sign for Punalu'u beach

Punaluʻu Beach (also called Black Sand Beach) is a beach between Pāhala and Nāʻālehu on the Big Island of the U.S. state of Hawaii. The beach has black sand made of basalt and created by lava flowing into the ocean which explodes as it reaches the ocean and cools. Punaluʻu is frequented by endangered hawksbill and green turtles, which can often be seen basking on the black sand.

== Description ==
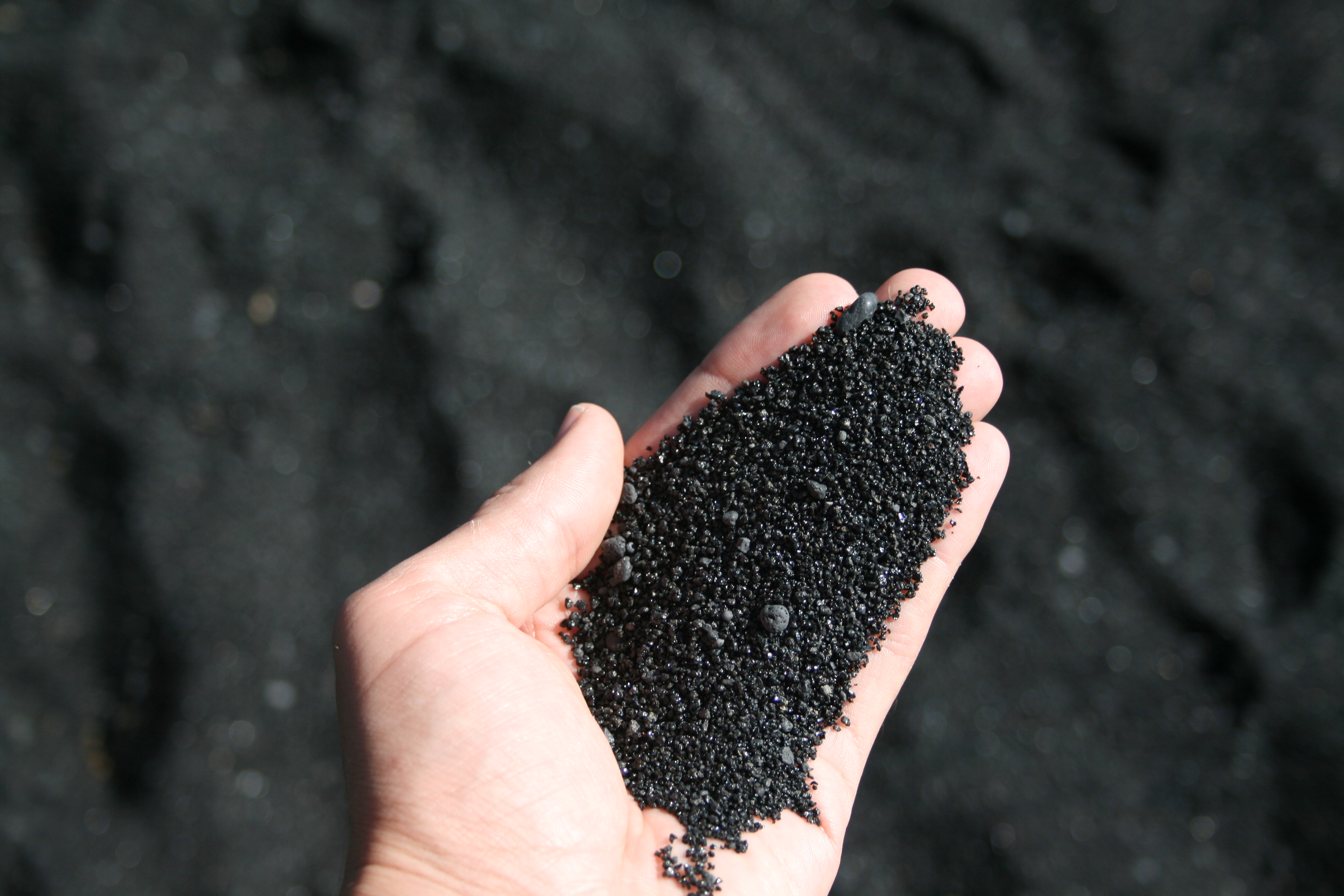
Close-up of black sand

The swimming area is very rocky, and it can be dangerous to swim. The beach also has a large amount of underground fresh water that flows in it. This fresh water is very cold. Legend has it that in the time of drought, the ancient Hawaiians living in the area would dive underwater with a jug to get their fresh water. In the Hawaiian language puna luʻu means "spring [water] diver for".

The beach is located at coordinates 19.136°N 155.504°W. Access is from the Hawaii Belt Road: take Ninole loop road or the entrance to the Sea Mountain Resort.

Camping is permitted at the Punaluʻu Black Sand Beach Park.

== Cultural features ==
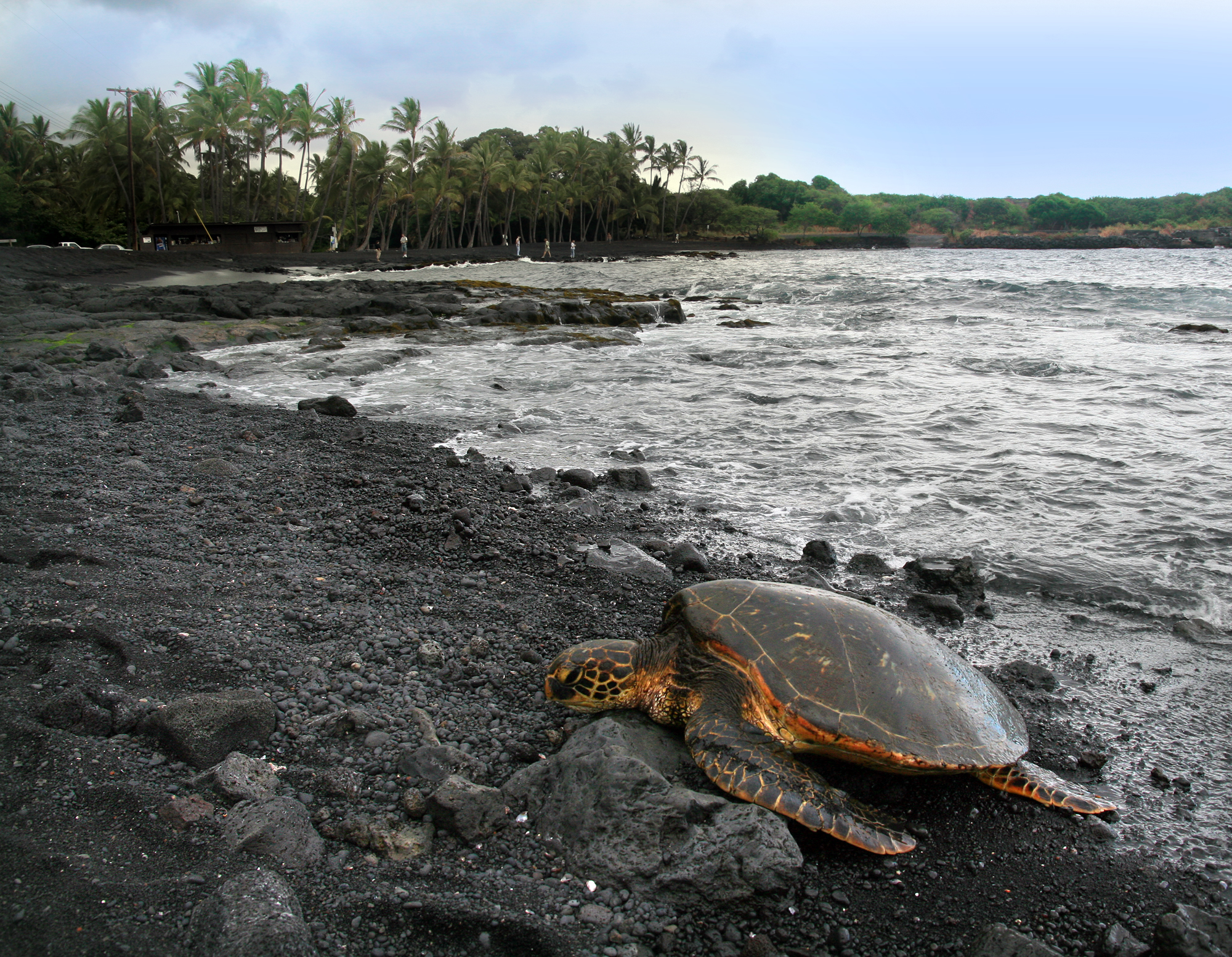
A green turtle basking on the beach

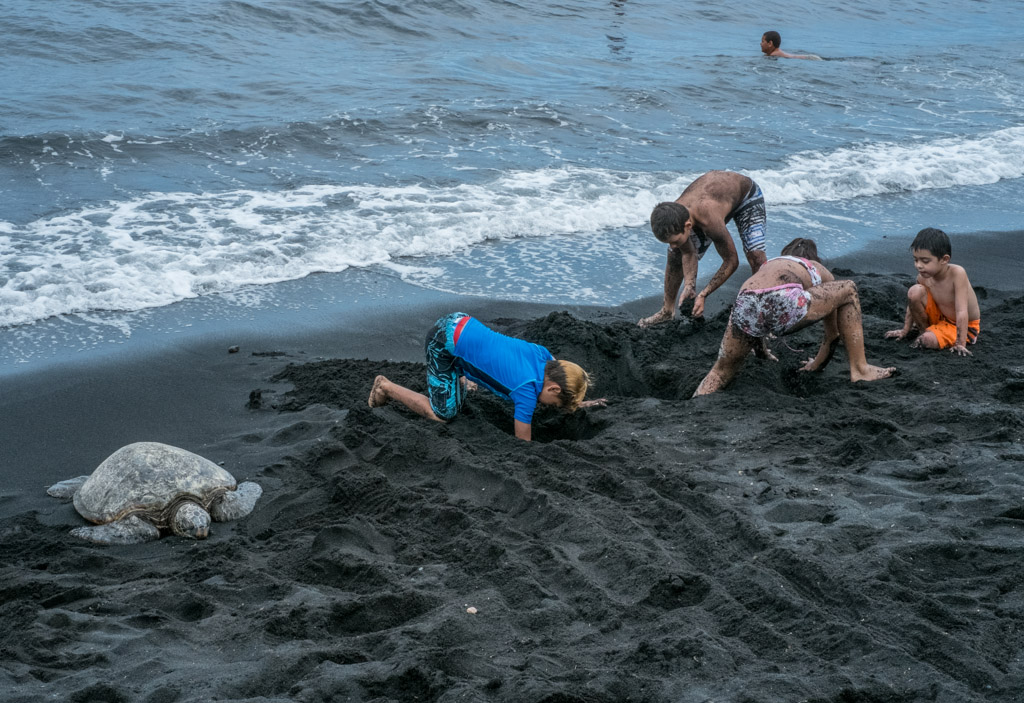
Children and honu share the black-sand beach at Punaluʻu.

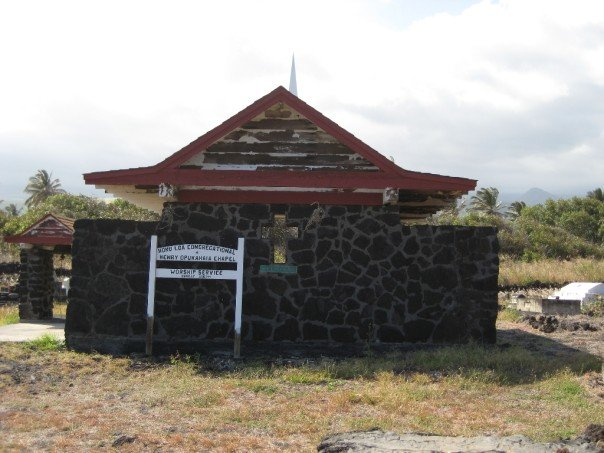
The Henry Opukahaia Chapel

Punaluʻu and adjacent areas provide evidence of the shifts in use of sacred space over time. Monumental architecture in the form of large heiau complexes (ritual centers) speak to the power of the aliʻi (ruling class) and the social stratification of the ancient Kaʻū district. With the advent of missionaries arriving in the district as early as 1833, Christianity left its distinct architectural hallmark on the landscape of Kaʻū. Sitting on the ridge above Punaluʻu is the Hōkūloa Church, a memorial chapel and graveyard built near the birthplace of Henry ʻŌpūkahaʻia (1792–1818) who inspired the missionary movement that changed Hawaii.

There are three pre-contact heiau within the immediate vicinity of Punaluʻu. The walled heiau was introduced to Hawaii about 1100 and Punaluʻuu is one of the last places in Hawaii with an unaltered view from one heiau to the next.

To the south lies Kaʻieʻi.e. Heiau. Thought to be a fishing shrine, the heiau was built on a prominent bluff overlooking the ocean to the south, what were once the Ninole fishponds to the west and Koloa Bay to the east—home of the legendary na ʻiliʻili hanau (birthing stones) said to have supernatural ability to propagate. These smooth, water-polished stones were highly desired and were used for paving heiau, for arming slingshots and as game pieces for the Hawaiian game konane. The name Kaʻieʻi.e. is thought to refer to a type of fishing trap or weir made of the fibrous ʻieʻie vine. Considered to be in good condition by early surveyors, several walls and a raised stone platform are all that remain of Kaʻieʻi.e. today. Scholarship has interpreted the site as multi-functional. It likely served as a place of offerings and tributes, an observation point for monitoring the fishponds, and a communications relay and dissemination location.

The heiau complex of Lanipau was heavily impacted by the construction of the Sea Mountain Resort golf course. Once the largest of the three, today what remains of Lanipau is surrounded by putting and driving greens.

The heiau complex that sits overlooking the ocean and Punaluʻu Beach is referred to by many names including Halelau, Kaneʻeleʻele; Mailekini or Punaluʻu Nui. This hieau likely extended to the edge of the cliff at Punaluʻu Bay. Its westernmost boundary was destroyed to make way for the construction of a wharf–warehouse complex for the sugar company in 1906. Identified as a heiau luakini (human sacrifice temple), a large table-like stone rests outside the southernmost wall and is known locally as Pohaku Mohai (sacrificial stone). Early site surveys noted possible kauhale (houses) adjacent to the heiau that were likely the residences of na kahuna (religious specialists).

Another important cultural feature is Ala Kahakai (trail by the sea) that served as an important link between ritual centers and coastal communities. The ala kahakai was thought to be the original route taken by the God Lono from North Kohala to the southernmost tip of the island and then windward along the Kaʻu coast to Puna. This trail once paved with the na ʻiliʻili hanau was designated as a National Historic Trail in 1929 and remnants can be found at both Punaluʻu Nui and Kaʻieʻi.e. heiau.

Kiʻi pohaku (petroglyphs) can be found near the County Park Pavilions within a protected area surrounded by a rock wall just past the parking area.

== Fauna ==
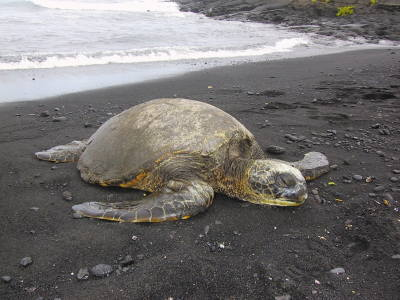
A honu resting on Punaluʻu

Rare and endangered native animals known at Punaluʻu and Ninole are the honu ea (hawksbill turtle), honu (green turtle), Hawaiian monk seal, native bees, orange-black damselfly, and other anchialine pool fauna. Native birds are seen near the shore and cliffs or fly over the area on their way to the sea from upland nesting colonies, including the endangered Hawaiian hawk (ʻio) that nests in the trees at Punaluʻu. Spinner dolphins and humpback whales can also be sighted offshore from Punaluʻu. A sighting of a Hawaiian monk seal was reported at Punaluʻu in 2006 near the boat ramp, and most recently in April 2024, and several known nesting sites of the endangered hawksbill turtles are located along the Punaluʻu and Ninole area. Such occurrences indicate a healthy environment with adequate resources to support large marine animals. Hawaiian Hawksbll Project, Ka'u Preservation, Malama Punaluʻu. 2024

The hawksbill turtle or honu'ea (Eretmochelys imbricata), is a federally listed endangered species and is the rarest sea turtle in the Pacific Ocean. Researchers estimate there are fewer than 80 nesting hawksbill turtles in the Hawaiian islands, of which 67 nest on the island of Hawaiʻi. More than half of the known nesting population statewide, 40 individuals nest along the southeast boundary of Hawaiʻi Volcanoes National park to Waikapuna.

The threatened green turtle or honu (Chelonia mydas) feeds on marine plants in shallow waters along the coastline such as Punaluʻu. Red seaweed, a favorite food of the green turtle flourishes on the coral-encrusted rocks in the shallow waters of the bay and the turtles are found basking on the black sand beach despite the presence of beachgoers. Researchers with the National Marine Fisheries have been studying the green turtle since 1982 along with groups of students. Visitors must remain 20 ft (6.1 m) from the turtles at all times.

The endangered Hawaiian hoary bat, ʻopeʻapeʻa, (Lasirus cinereus semotus), is known to fly over and reside at Punaluʻu. Their habitat stretches from sea level to over 13,000 feet. It usually weighs about 5 to 8 ounces, is nocturnal and feeds on insects. Relatively little research has been done on this endemic Hawaiian bat and data regarding its habitat and population status is very limited.

One of the largest populations of the rare orange-black damselfly (Megalagrion xanthomelas) can be found at Ninole. It is a candidate endangered species and thrives in the aquatic habitat of the extensive spring complex that stretches from Nīnole Springs to the estuary at Honuʻapo. Systematic surveys have observed damselfly populations at Kāwāʻa, Hīlea, Nīnole, and Honuʻapo. The highest densities occur at the back of estuarine marsh, at the mouth of Hīlea and Nīnole Streams, and at Kāwāʻa Springs.

== Vegetation ==
The native plant communities generally appear as a narrow strand of vegetation, mostly a flattened growth of various shrubs, vines, grass-like plants, scattered trees and herbs. The varied habitats of pāhoehoe (smooth, ropy lava), and ʻaʻā flats, drifted sand, anchialine pond shores, protected beaches, and sea spray battered bluffs each support different native plant communities. In the reconnaissance survey, fourteen species of coastal strand plants (six trees, seven ground cover or shrub forms and the invasive aquatic water hyacinth). Native plants such as ilima (Sida fallax), naupaka kahakai (Scaevola taccada), and pōhuehue (Ipomoea pes-caprae brasiliensis) were found in the area.

== Wetlands ==
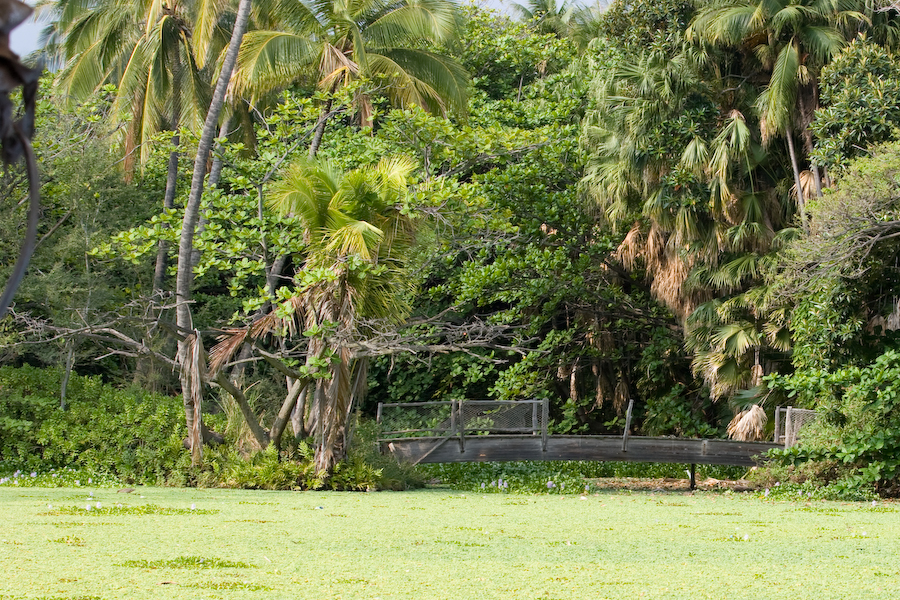
The wetlands adjacent to Punaluʻu Beach

The second largest spring complex on Hawaiʻi Island is located at Punaluʻu and Ninole Cove. Stretching from Punaluʻu to Nīnole Springs through Kāwāʻa to Honuʻpo, is a series of wetlands fed by basal springs and intermittent streams that support a broad range of native fauna. These spring and pool complexes contain individuals, particularly juveniles or recruits, of several marine invertebrates and fishes, suggesting it may be a significant refuge or nursery area for nearshore marine fauna on the southern coast of Hawaii Island.

== Anchialine pools ==
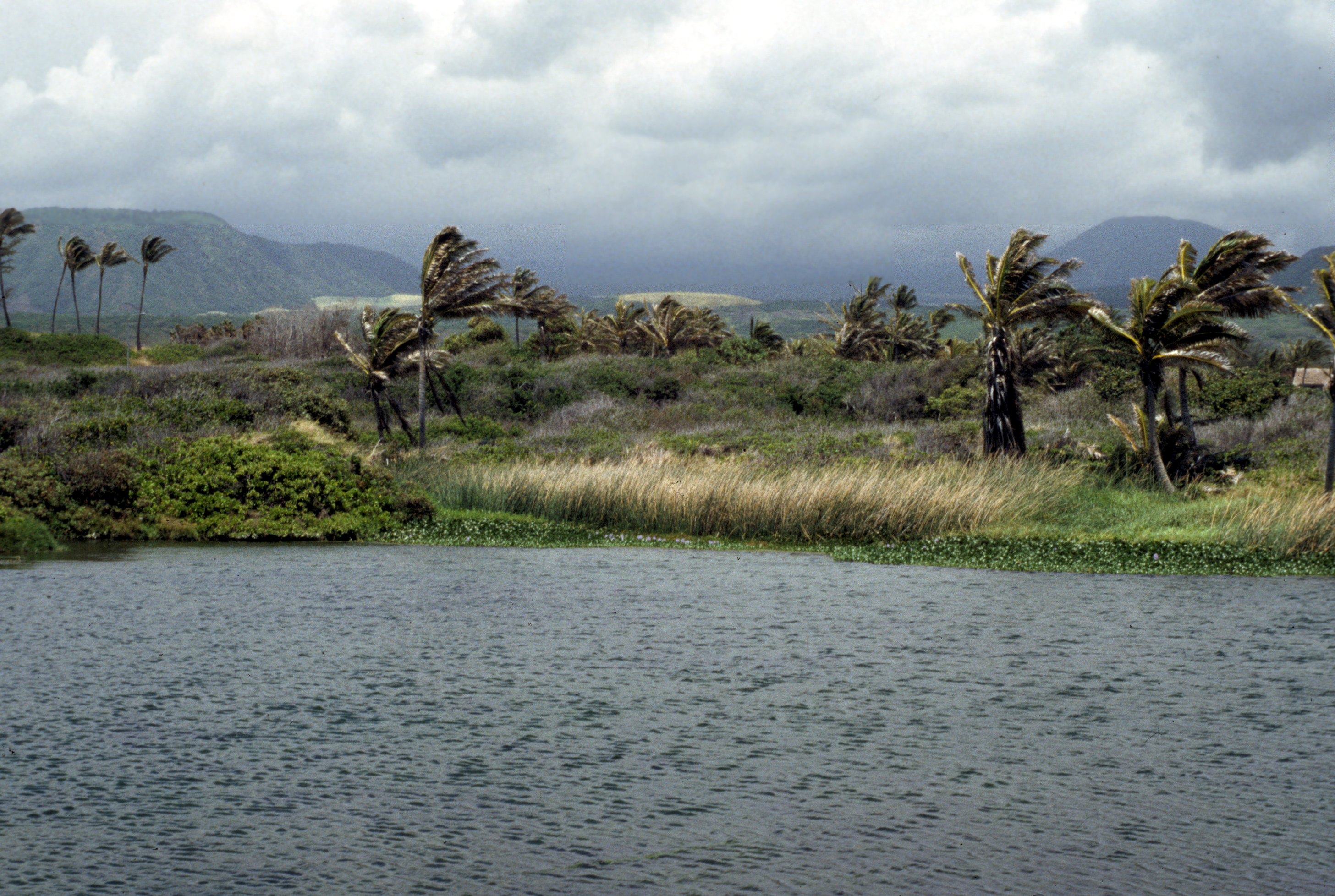
Marshy area and anchialine pond near Ninole on the Big Island of Hawaii near Punalu'u Black Sand Beach

Anchialine pools of various types occur near and around Punaluʻu and Ninole Cove. These pools are rare and localized brackish waters along coastal lava flows that exhibit tidal fluctuations without a surface connection to the sea. They include open pools near the shore as well as undisturbed pools in collapsed lava tubes, cracks, and caves. Endemic and native shrimp species live in pools and travel between and through them through underground cracks. The orange-black damselfly (Megalagrion xanthomelas) breeds in the anchialine pools while native insects perch on the nearby vegetation. Throughout the state, anchialine species are severely threatened by alien insects, habitat loss due to coastal development, and other human impacts.

Anchialine ponds are one of Hawaii's most threatened ecosystems. Anchialine pools are landlocked brackish ponds located close to the shoreline connected to the ocean via tunnels. Characterized by tidal fluctuations, these rare and fragile ponds are home to unusual plants and animals.

In the U.S., this habitat exists only in the Hawaiian Islands and, of the approximately 700 known anchialine pools, the majority are located on the island of Hawaii. Formed by volcanic activity, these pools are home to a unique assemblage of invertebrate and algal species, some of which are known to exist only in this habitat. In the last 20 years, non-native fish species have been introduced and/or invaded a majority of the pools. These alien species have gradually destroyed the ecological balance in many of the pools by eliminating many of unique endemic species.

== Fish houses ==
Punaluʻu has long been known for its koa ("fish houses") where specific species of fish live in specific areas offshore. The pristine, spring fed waters of Punaluʻu mixing with the salt water of the ocean provide ideal habitat for a variety of fish that live in these naturally created koa. There are several koa just offshore from Punaluʻu still used by local fishermen. Each koa is identified by the species of fish that live there, including yellowfin tuna (ahi) and mackerel (ono, or wahoo). Historically, Hawaiian families would feed the fish in the koa cooked taro and pumpkin and the fish, in return, would provide a constant source of protein.

== Development ==
A golf course on both sides of the Belt Road was built here by C. Brewer & Co. from 1969 to 1972. A larger resort was proposed in 1986. After opposition, the plans were scaled back. The project was partially built but abandoned.

In 2005, further development called "Sea Mountain" of about 433 acres (175 ha) and up to 2000 residential units was proposed by a company based in Beverly Hills, California. An environmental impact statement was developed in 2006. Despite the involvement of Jean-Michel Cousteau, this development met local opposition.

== In popular culture ==
In the 1960s, Japanese actor and guitarist Yūzō Kayama composed a surf rock tune called "Black Sand Beach". This song has since been played by Yūzō Kayama and Launchers, Takeshi Terauchi and Blue Jeans, The Ventures, and The Aquatudes.
