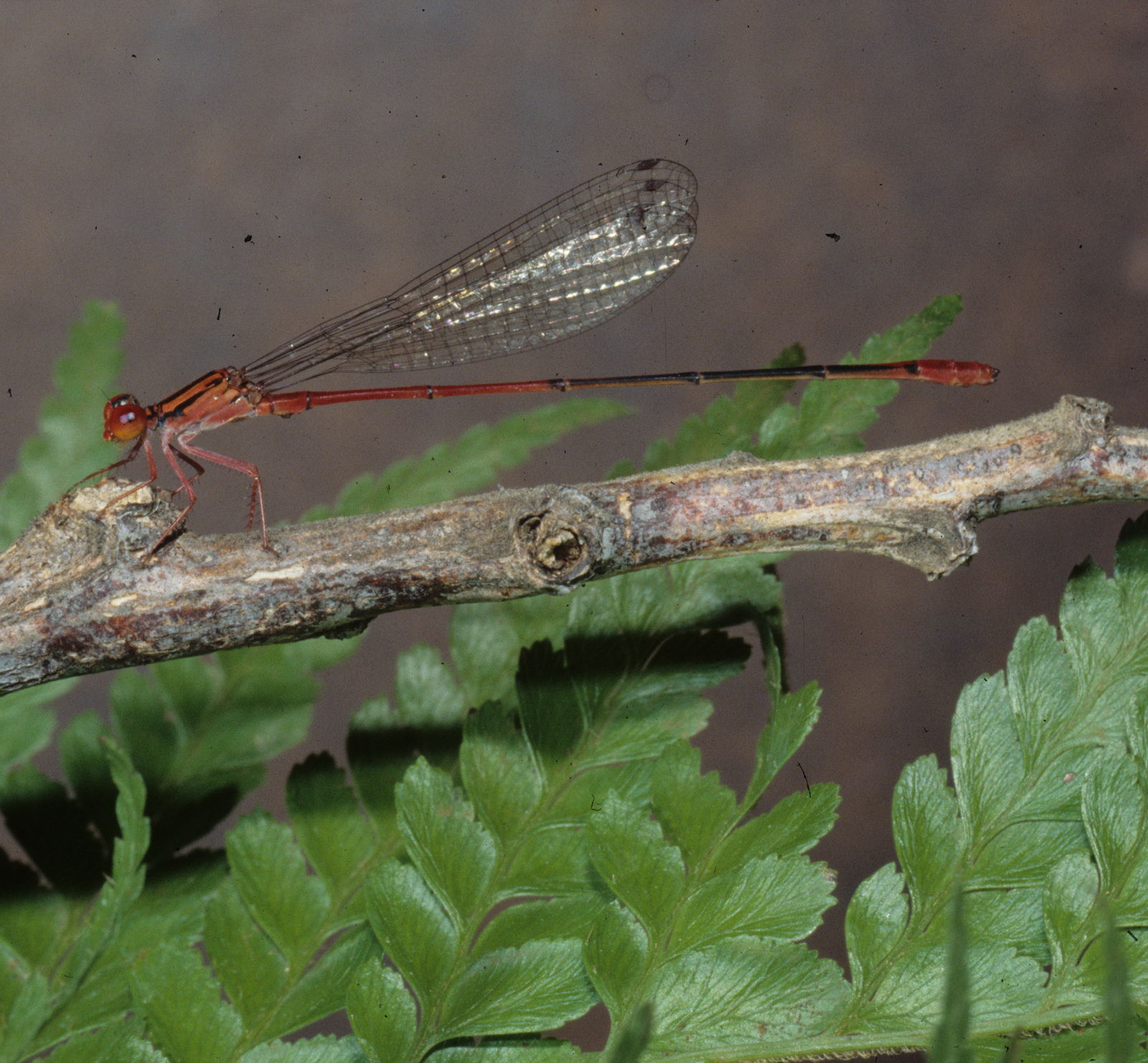

Conservation status
- Critically Endangered (IUCN 3.1)

- Endangered (ESA)

Scientific classification
- Kingdom: Animalia
- Phylum: Arthropoda
- Clade: Pancrustacea
- Class: Insecta
- Order: Odonata
- Suborder: Zygoptera
- Family: Coenagrionidae
- Genus: Megalagrion
- Species: M. leptodemas

Binomial name
- Megalagrion leptodemas (Perkins, 1899)
- The island of Oahu

= Megalagrion leptodemas =

Species of insect

Megalagrion leptodemas, commonly referred to as the crimson Hawaiian damselfly, is one of the rarest and most endangered Megalagrion species that is endemic to the island of Oahu in Hawaii. It is currently labeled as endangered by the ESA and critically endangered on the IUCN Red List. The general biology of crimson Hawaiian damselflies is similar to other narrow-winged damselflies. Megalagrion leptodemas used to be found in the mountains of Ko’olau and Wai'anae but is now only found in four watersheds in the Ko’olau Mountains. The species is threatened by habitat loss and non-native species. They have limited habitat and small, scattered populations which can affect their future population stability. Conservation efforts for this species should concentrate on both habitat management and control of invasive species.

== Description ==
The Crimson Hawaiian damselfly is one of the smaller damselflies, growing to about 38 mm (1.5 in) in length with a wingspan of around 40 mm (1.6 in). Males have bright red bodies with black markings on top of their abdominal segments five to seven. Like the males, female damselflies are red but have some pale green or gray markings on their body and black covering the top of their abdomen. Crimson Hawaiian damselfly naiads look similar to other damselfly larvae, with large eyes, thin legs, and three leaf-like gills at their tail end.

== Life History ==
Information on the life history of the crimson Hawaiian damselfly is not well-known due to the rarity of the species. However, much of its life history can be inferred from other Hawaiian damselflies.

Megalagrion leptodemas breeds in slow-flowing streams and small pools. During mating, most damselfly males hold the female behind the head, guarding her against rival males. To lay her eggs many female damselflies will patrol streams to find protected areas, and vegetation on submerged rocks. Once the eggs have been laid both adults will stay close to the breeding pools. At this point the male damselflies become territorial, guarding these areas.

In many damselfly species hatching occurs in about ten days. The naiads in most species of Hawaiian damselflies are aquatic with the exception of Megalagrion oahuense. During this nymph stage the damselflies breathe through abdominal gills, and feed on small invertebrates and fish. They often rest on submerged rocks and surrounding vegetation but also explore the open water of their breeding pool or stream. After 4 months of maturing, naiads leave the water to molt into adults on surrounding rocks or vegetation. Even after becoming adults, damselflies often stay close to their early aquatic habitat. Generally, adult Hawaiian damselflies reach sexual maturity in about 16–20 days.

== Ecology ==
=== Diet ===
Immature damselflies feed on small fish, mosquito larvae, and other aquatic invertebrates. Damselfly larvae feed by hiding until their prey is near, and quickly extending their jaws to capture it. Adult narrow-winged damselflies are also predatory, feeding on small flying insects such as flies, moths, mosquitoes, and midges.

=== Behavior ===
The behavior of Megalagrion leptodemas is similar to other narrow-winged damselflies. During mating, damselfly males will guard the female from other damselflies by holding them behind the head and flying in tandem. Adult crimson Hawaiian damselflies stay close to breeding pools, sit on streamside plants, and guard the stream corridor. Most damselfly males are territorial and guard areas where females have laid eggs.

=== Habitat ===
Crimson Hawaiian damselflies live in the slow parts of streams, or pools in lowland wet and wet cliff environments on Oahu. Damselflies live in parts of streams that don't have foreign predatory fish, which are usually the parts above man-made barriers. Most immature damselflies are aquatic and inhabit slow-flowing pools and streams, as well as surrounding vegetation until they leave the water to molt into adults. Currently Megalagrion leptodemas is believed to be in only three areas in Oahu, all in the Ko'olau Range.

=== Range ===
Little is known about crimson Hawaiian damselfly population size and characteristics. Local biologists believe the crimson damselfly species is the rarest and most endangered of the Oahu damselflies. There are currently only three known instances of the crimson Hawaiian damselfly, all from the Ko'olau Mountains in the lowland wet and wet cliff ecosystems at Moanalua, north Halawa, and Ma'akua. Although their range is uncertain, a range map can be found on the Environmental Conservation Online System website.

== Conservation ==
=== Population size ===
Megalagrion leptodemas was last seen in the late 1990's, so there are no concrete population estimates available. However it is probable that there are less than 1,000 individuals remaining. Based on previous surveys the existing populations of this damselfly have been reduced significantly, with only 10 males or less per 100m of stream edge in all localities.

=== Past and Current Geographical Distribution ===
Historically, the crimson Hawaiian damselfly was found in eight areas around the island of Oahu in the Waiʻanae Mountains and scattered locations in the Koʻolau Mountains. Surveys have been done between 1990 and 2008, however none of them found this species at the locations on Oahu. Currently, there are only three known occurrences of the crimson Hawaiian damselfly. These are all in the Ko’olau Mountains at Moanalua, north Halawa, and Ma’akua.

This species was last seen in the late 1990's in the lowland wet ecosystem of Waiawa. During observations in Moanalua Stream in the April 2015 BioBlitz, scientists saw individual adult damselflies in the upper valley headwaters. They also saw eight male damselflies in the stream on the north side of Middle Ridge. The same place was visited in 2018 but no damselflies were found.

=== Major Threats ===
The main threat facing the crimson Hawaiian damselfly is the degradation of its habitat. Specifically, there has been a loss of their stream habitat due to diversion and the use of their water for wells. These can reduce stream flow and leave areas of streams completely dry. Increased flooding and landslides also contribute to the damage of their habitat.

Predation by non-native animals is also a significant threat to the crimson Hawaiian damselfly. Their offspring, which spawn in pools and slow flowing sections of streams, are vulnerable to predation by invasive fish. Research has shown a correlation between the presence of non-native bullfrogs and the absence of these damselflies in streams. Ants are also a major source of predation for the crimson Hawaiian damselfly.

Moving forward, the crimson Hawaiian damselfly will be heavily impacted by climate change. The species is not well adapted to increases in water temperature and changes in rainfall that climate change will bring. Additionally, there will be an increased number of storms and hurricanes that have the potential to destroy the already limited habitat of this species.

=== Listing under the ESA ===
This species, along with 224 others was petitioned on May 11, 2004 to be listed as threatened or endangered, along with a designation for critical habitat. On September 18, 2012 the US Fish and Wildlife Service listed the crimson Hawaiian damselfly as endangered under the Endangered Species Act. Additionally, the species is listed as critically endangered on the IUCN Red List.

=== 5-year review ===
A 5 year review plan was published in 2019 by the US Fish and Wildlife Service in Honolulu, Hawaii. The review stated that no new information had been found on the biology or life history of the crimson Hawaiian damselfly, and no changes in status were made.

The review recommended that a targeted search be done to determine the distribution of the species and to evaluate the habitat and the biological characteristics of Megalagrion leptodemas to aid in its conservation. Finally, the report outlined steps to prevent further spread of invasive species and protect the habitat of the crimson Hawaiian damselfly.

=== Recovery Plan ===
The crimson Hawaiian damselfly was one of the species included in the US Fish and Wildlife Service’s Recovery Plan, released in July 2018, for the island of Oahu. The plan is currently being implemented and has several different steps outlined below.

1. Protect ecosystems and control threats
  - Identify and survey remaining extant populations for all species and the habitats in which they occur
  - Develop fine-scale climate models for these species to identify future suitable habitat based on existing and historical distributions as well as projected climate conditions
  - Identify areas in each habitat necessary for recovery and delineate representative management units
  - Ensure long-term protection of management units
  - Monitor management and use results to adapt management actions
2. Control species-specific threats
  - Develop and implement control for slugs
  - Develop and implement control for rodents
  - Develop and implement control for non-native fish and amphibians
  - Control other threats as appropriate
  - Monitor management and use results to adapt management actions
3. Expand the range of existing wild populations and establish additional populations to increase numbers for resilience to threats
  - Develop habitat and climate models to identify areas within management units appropriate for establishing or augmenting populations
  - Select populations for augmentation or sites for reintroduction
  - Prepare reintroduction sites
  - Propagate genetically appropriate individuals for augmentation or reintroduction
  - Release genetically appropriate individuals
  - Monitor success of release and use results to adapt management actions
4. Control new threats before they become widespread
  - Conduct surveys for invasive species in areas of likely influx, and proactively control any newly discovered pest or invasive species
  - Improve border security to prevent the influx of new pests and invasive species into the State and the island of Oʻahu
5. Conduct additional research essential to recover species and restore the habitats on which they depend
  - Conduct studies on the range, demography, and dispersal of each species
  - Conduct population viability analyses (PVA) for each species as data becomes available
  - Evaluate research results and implement adaptive management as necessary
6. Develop and implement a detailed monitoring plan for each species and ecosystem
7. Develop down listing and delisting criteria at the species and habitat level as necessary to validate recovery objectives
8. Partner with key stakeholders to develop and accomplish above objectives

In the short term, the recovery plan attempts to minimize the threats facing Megalagrion leptodemas such as habitat modification and invasive species. The plan also outlines future steps to find more information about the species and better target conservation efforts. In the long run, the plan will hopefully mitigate the impending effects of climate change, avoid future threats to the species, and increase education and outreach to the general public.
