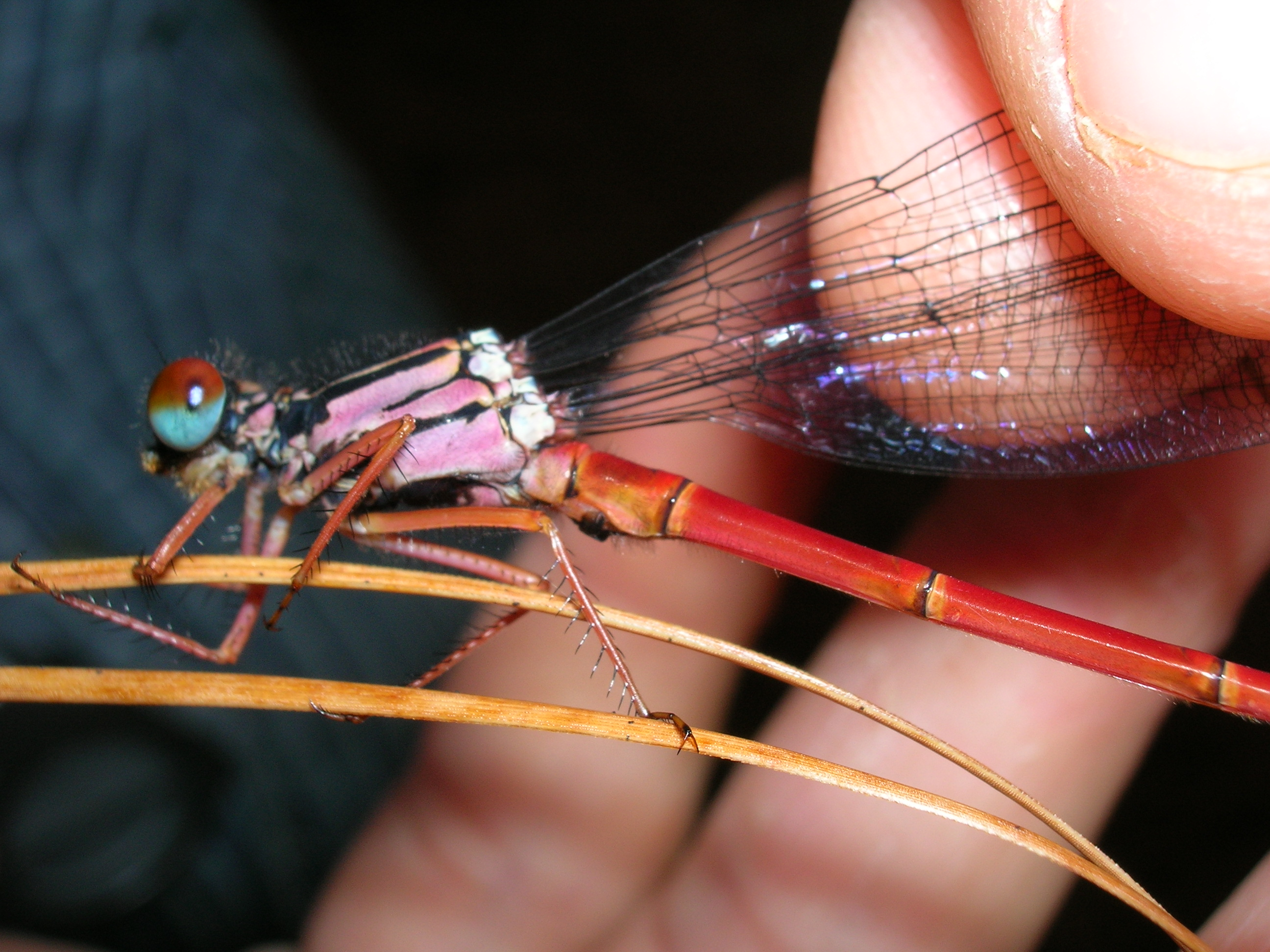
- M. blackburni

Scientific classification
- Kingdom: Animalia
- Phylum: Arthropoda
- Class: Insecta
- Order: Odonata
- Suborder: Zygoptera
- Family: Coenagrionidae
- Genus: Megalagrion; McLachlan, 1883

Species
- See text

= Megalagrion =

Genus of damselflies

Megalagrion is a genus of damselflies in the family Coenagrionidae. It contains approximately 26 species, all of which are endemic to Hawaiʻi. Megalagrion damselflies are the only native damselflies in Hawaiʻi, and are referred to as "pinapinao" in ʻ ʻŌlelo Hawaiʻi. Other endemic Hawaiian Odonata are the dragonflies Anax strenuus and Nesogonia blackburni, which are referred to as "pinao".

Nymphal Megalagrion live in widely diverse habitats, including the expected streams and pools. Megalagrion also exploit some surprising habitats such as plant leaf axils of the 'ie'ie vine, waterfall faces and seeps, and even damp fern litter outside of the water. M. oahuense is the only species of damselfly whose naiad is terrestrial, living in damp leaf litter under banks of uluhe ferns until metamorphosis.

Many species of Megalagrion are in danger due to habitat loss and predation by non-native fish such as mosquitofish. To protect them, non-native fish should never be released in Hawaiian streams.

The genus contains the following species:

- Megalagrion adytum (Perkins, 1899) – adytum swamp damselfly
- Megalagrion amaurodytum (Perkins, 1899)
- Megalagrion blackburni McLachlan, 1883
- Megalagrion calliphya (McLachlan, 1883)
- Megalagrion deceptor (McLachlan, 1883)
- Megalagrion dinesiotes (Kennedy, 1934)
- Megalagrion eudytum (Perkins, 1899)
- Megalagrion hawaiiense (McLachlan, 1883)
- Megalagrion heterogamias (Perkins, 1899)
- Megalagrion jugorum (Perkins, 1899) – Maui upland damselfly, (Maui, Critically Endangered)
- Megalagrion kauaiense (Perkins, 1899)
- Megalagrion koelense (Blackburn, 1884) – Koele mountain damselfly
- Megalagrion leptodemas (Perkins, 1899) – crimson Hawaiian damselfly
- Megalagrion mauka Daigle, 1997
- Megalagrion molokaiense (Perkins, 1899) – Molokai damselfly
- Megalagrion nesiotes (Perkins, 1899) – flying earwig Hawaiian damselfly
- Megalagrion nigrohamatum (Blackburn, 1884) – nigrohamatum damselfly
- Megalagrion oahuense (Blackburn, 1884) – Oahu damselfly
- Megalagrion oceanicum McLachlan, 1883 – oceanic Hawaiian damselfly
- Megalagrion oresitrophum (Perkins, 1899)
- Megalagrion orobates (Perkins, 1899)
- Megalagrion pacificum (McLachlan, 1883) – Pacific Hawaiian damselfly
- Megalagrion paludicola Maciolex & Howarth, 1979 – Kauai bog damselfly
- Megalagrion vagabundum (Perkins, 1899)
- Megalagrion williamsoni (Perkins, 1910)
- Megalagrion xanthomelas (Selys, 1876) – orangeblack Hawaiian damselfly
