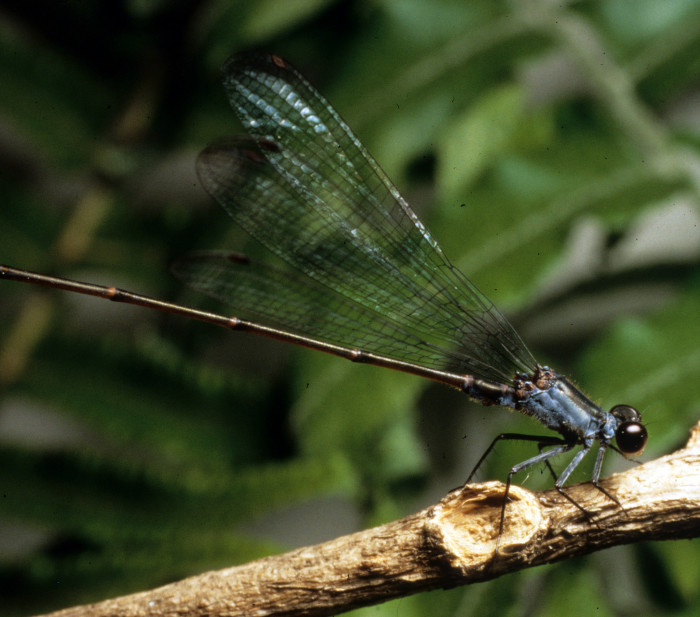

Conservation status
- Endangered (ESA)

- Critically Endangered (IUCN 3.1)

Scientific classification
- Kingdom: Animalia
- Phylum: Arthropoda
- Clade: Pancrustacea
- Class: Insecta
- Order: Odonata
- Suborder: Zygoptera
- Family: Coenagrionidae
- Genus: Megalagrion
- Species: M. nesiotes

Binomial name
- Megalagrion nesiotes R. C. L. Perkins
- The island of Maui

= Megalagrion nesiotes =

Species of damselfly

Megalagrion nesiotes is a species of damselfly in the family Coenagrionidae. Its common name is flying earwig Hawaiian damselfly. In the past, the flying earwig Hawaiian damselfly lived on the islands of Hawaii and Maui, in the U.S. state of Hawaii. Currently, there is only one population left in east Maui. Limited distribution and small population size make this species especially vulnerable to habitat loss and exotic species invasion. The flying earwig Hawaiian damselfly was last found in 2005. Little is known about this species because of the lack of observation. In 2010, the species was federally listed as an endangered species in the United States.

== Description ==
Adult damselflies have a slender body and fold their wings parallel to the body when at rest. Compared to other damselfly species, the flying earwig Hawaiian damselfly is relatively larger and more elongated. Adults are usually 46–50 mm (1.8–2.0 in) in length. Their wingspan reaches 50–53 mm (2.0–2.1 in). Males are blue and black. They have enlarged and pincer-like abdominal appendages, cerci. The resemblance of the cerci between this species and the earwigs gives this damselfly its common name. Females are primarily brownish. The wings of both sexes are clear except for the darkened tips.

There are no direct records associated with the immatures of the flying earwig Hawaiian damselfly.

== Life History ==
Information about the flying earwig Hawaiian damselfly is largely unknown. It is inferred that the life history of this species is like that of some other narrow-winged damselflies in the family Coenagrionidae. As a result, the following life-history traits are from both the flying earwig Hawaiian damselfly and other damselfly species in the family Coenagrionidae.

=== The flying earwig Hawaiian damselfly ===
The flying earwig Hawaiian damselfly is hemimetabolous. It has three life stages: the egg stage, the immature larval stage (naiad), and the adult stage. Flying earwig Hawaiian damselfly adults are weak flyers. They tend to stay on dense vegetation and fly low near the ground. Females may lay eggs on wet banks or in leaf litter near seeps. No direct observation of the naiads is recorded. However, it is proposed that, unlike many other damselfly species that have fully aquatic naiads, the naiads of the flying earwig Hawaiian damselfly are terrestrial or semi-terrestrial. They may live in damp leaf litter or within moist soil or seeps.

=== General damselfly species in the family Coenagrionidae ===
Many female damselflies can produce more than one clutch of eggs in their lifetime. They can produce thousands of eggs each time, but the mortality of eggs and naiads is very high. In extreme cases, the survival rate of eggs to adults is only 0-3%.

Damselflies typically reproduce during late spring and summer. They may lay eggs in submerged aquatic plants. It takes about ten days for eggs to hatch. Most naiads of Hawaiian damselfly species are aquatic and predaceous. They have three flattened abdominal gills for breathing, and they feed on small aquatic invertebrates or fish. Naiads may go through 5 to 15 molts as they grow. After several months, they mature and leave the water to become winged adults. For the rest of their life, which usually ranges from a few weeks to several months, they live close to the aquatic habitats and breed there.

Yet, a few other species, including the flying earwig Hawaiian damselfly, have terrestrial or semi-terrestrial immatures. These naiads are usually found in moist leafy habitats on the ground. They have short and stout and hairy gills and are unable to swim. The knowledge about this kind of naiad is limited and needs more research.

== Ecology ==
=== Diet ===
The flying earwig Hawaiian damselflies are assumed to be predaceous. Using the diet of narrow-winged damselflies as a reference, scientists suggest that the flying earwig Hawaiian damselfly adults prey on small insects such as flies, mosquitoes, and moths. The immatures have a more aquatic diet including mosquito larvae.

=== Behavior ===
The behavior of flying earwig Hawaiian damselfly was not well-observed. According to patterns of other damselfly species, when mating, damselfly males grasp the females with their abdominal appendages, forming in tandem. This behavior helps defend their mates against rival males. When females lay their eggs, the damselfly males guard their habitats. Breeding of the flying earwig Hawaiian damselfly takes place in leaf litter or damp banks near streams. There are no direct observations on the naiad biology of this species.

When foraging while flying, the adult damselflies use their spiny legs to form a basket to capture prey. For arthropod prey, they often perch themselves and pounce on their prey.

Flying earwig Hawaiian damselfly adults fly low near their habitats. They are not strong flyers, and they prefer to spend time perching among vegetation. Different from aquatic Hawaiian damselfly species, flying earwig Hawaiian damselfly may fly downward when disturbed. They do not fly up and away like aquatic species.

=== Habitat ===
Flying earwig Hawaiian damselfly adults prefer moist areas as habitats. These include wet ridges, forest understory, and steep, fern-covered damp banks. The naiads are believed to live in terrestrial or semi-terrestrial areas, but have never been observed or found. These naiads may occur in leaf litter and plant leaf axils around water, or moist soil between boulders. Flying earwig Hawaiian damselflies are sensitive to temperature changes. They seldom go out on cold and rainy days, while being more active in warm sunny weather.

=== Range ===
The flying earwig Hawaiian damselfly used to be found on the tropical islands of Hawaii and Maui. However, since the 1930s, this damselfly has not been observed on Hawaii. The last observation of this species was in 2005 on the island of Maui.

== Conservation ==
=== Population size ===
There were at least seven populations of this damselfly on the island of Hawaii, and five populations on the island of Maui. Now there is likely only one population left in east Maui. The last observation of the species was in 2005. No quantitative estimate of the size of this remaining population is available.

=== Past and Current Geographical Distribution ===
In the past, the flying earwig Hawaiian damselfly was on the islands of Hawaii and Maui. In Hawaii, it was known from seven or more general localities. The species has not been seen on Hawaii for over 80 years, however. Surveys within suitable habitats in the Kau and Olaa areas from 1997 to 2008 did not find any of the species. On Maui, the damselfly was historically reported from five general locations on the windward side of the island. Since the 1930s, however, it has only been observed in one area along a stream on the windward side of east Maui.

=== Major threats ===
One of the major threats of this damselfly is habitat loss. It is mainly caused by agricultural and urban development. Currently, global climate changes can also impact the habitat of the species. Stream modifications and diversions could change the surrounding flora, fauna, and prey availability. These changes may degrade the habitat as well.

Nonnative animals, particularly feral pigs, are another major threat. Feral pigs in wet forests on Maui crush the forest floor and lie around in moist areas. These activities remove local vegetation. Their excrement also provides nutrients to invasive plant species. On Maui, the feral pigs have destroyed the uluhe-dominated riparian habitat.

Finally, the overcollection of individuals, especially breeding adults, threatens the damselfly population.

=== Listing under the ESA ===
The flying earwig Hawaiian damselfly was petitioned to be listed under the ESA on May 11, 2004.

On June 24, 2010, the U.S. Fish and Wildlife Service determined the endangered status of the flying earwig Hawaiian damselfly under the Endangered Species Act of 1973. This indicates that the species will be given federal protections.

=== 5-year review ===
A 5-year review takes all information available of the species at the time of review. The two latest 5-year reviews of the flying earwig Hawaiian damselfly were conducted in 2016 and 2021. No significant new information was discovered.

=== Species Status Assessment ===
No Species Status Assessments (SSA's) are currently available for this species.

=== Recovery Plan ===
No final recovery plan for Megalagrion Nesiotes alone is available now.

There is, however, a draft recovery plan for 50 Hawaiian archipelago species. The draft was proposed on February 24, 2022. This document includes the recovery criteria for 3 species of Hawaiian damselflies, including Megalagrion Nesiotes. Megalagrion Nesiotes has a recovery priority number of 5. The goal is to make the species have redundant populations in its historical ranges. Populations should be self-sustaining, resilient, and genetically diverse.

Megalagrion Nesiotes requires systematic surveys and continuous population monitoring. Major strategies include the restoration and protection of species-specific habitats. It is urgent to increase its population size and distribution. Other plans include captive rearing and genetic storage. It is also necessary to control nonnative species. It is important to work with local government and private entities as well.

The downlisting criteria include at least ten stable populations. Suitable habitats for Megalagrion Nesiotes are protected and all significant threats are under control.

The delisting criteria need 10-year surveys. They ask for a significant increase in the size and distribution of the ten populations. Suitable habitats and minimal threats are also required.
