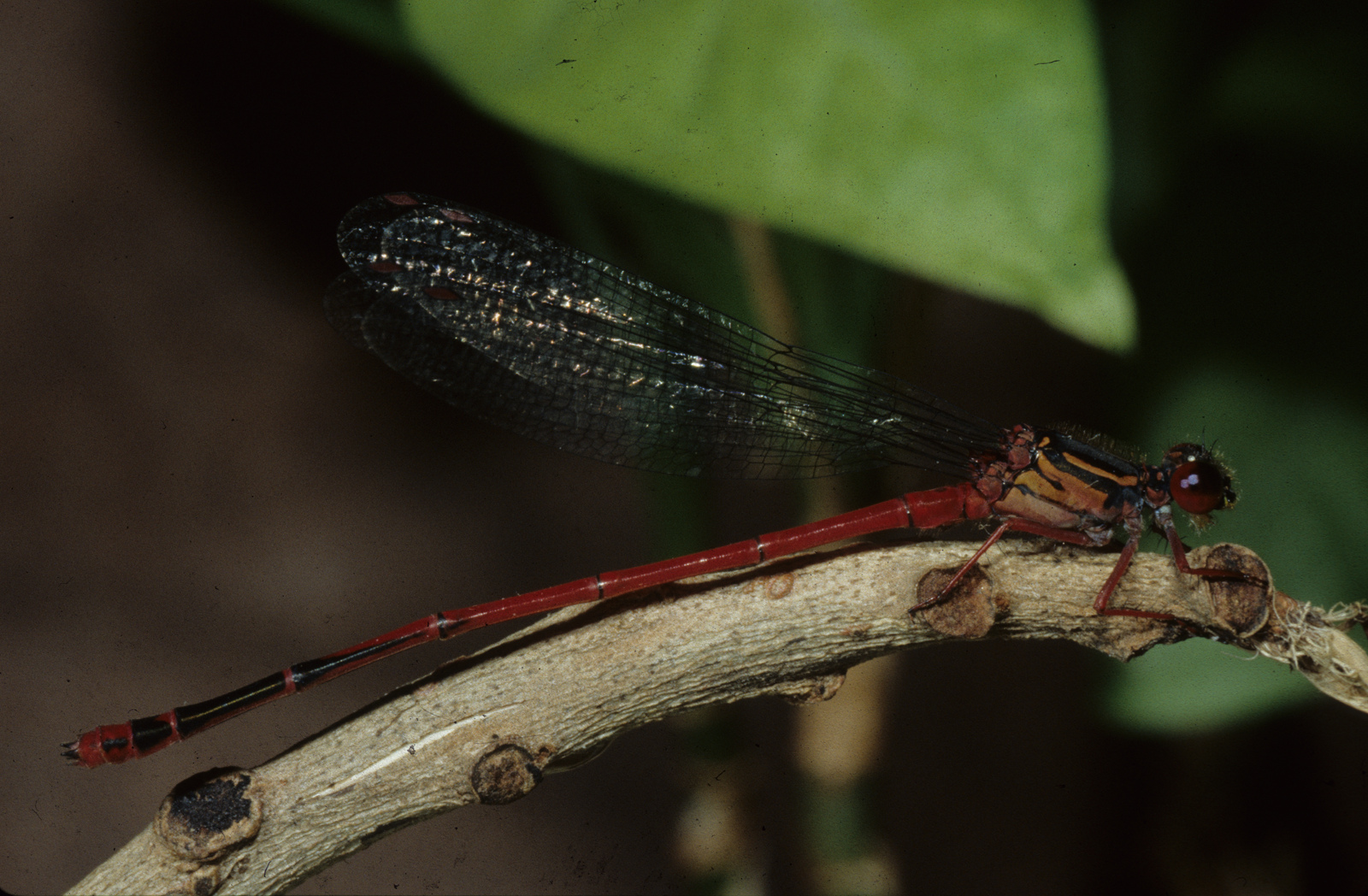

Conservation status
- Critically Endangered (IUCN 3.1)

Scientific classification
- Kingdom: Animalia
- Phylum: Arthropoda
- Clade: Pancrustacea
- Class: Insecta
- Order: Odonata
- Suborder: Zygoptera
- Family: Coenagrionidae
- Genus: Megalagrion
- Species: M. oceanicum

Binomial name
- Megalagrion oceanicum McLachlan, 1883

= Megalagrion oceanicum =

Species of damselfly

Megalagrion oceanicum is a species of damselfly in the family Coenagrionidae that is endemic to the island of Oʻahu in Hawaii. It inhabits rivers in the Waiʻanae and Koʻolau ranges. It is threatened by habitat loss.

== Description ==
The males are red and the females are green, but both genders have bold black stripes. What makes Megalagrion oceanicum unique is that they can grow to be as long as 1.8-1.9 inches, which makes them bigger than other damselflies. When damselflies are in the nymph stage, they either eat small aquatic invertebrates or fish. When they become adults, they catch and eat flying insects. During breeding season, the male protects the female while she lays eggs. The eggs are usually laid on rocks that are covered with algae.

== Distribution and Habitat ==
Megalagrion oceanicum is endemic to the island of Oʻahu in Hawaii. This damselfly species used to live in the Waianae mountains and the Koʻolau Range of Oahu. But now, because their numbers are decreasing, they are strictly only found in several streams at the Koʻolau Range. Generally, Megalagrion oceanicum live in places that are near water, such as marshes and wetlands. They are where the damselflies can reproduce and catch their prey. When they're nymphs, they live on rocks in fast-flowing streams. When the nymphs get older, they crawl out of the water and eat moss that are on rocks. Sadly, Megalagrion oceanicum are endangered due to habitat loss and invasive predators. Scientists are trying to determine their population size to see if they need extra protection. They are also monitoring different aquatic habitats to see if they're suitable enough for Megalagrion oceanicum to live in.
