= Megalagrion adytum =

Conservation status
- Least Concern (IUCN 3.1)

Scientific classification
- Kingdom: Animalia
- Phylum: Arthropoda
- Class: Insecta
- Order: Odonata
- Suborder: Zygoptera
- Family: Coenagrionidae
- Genus: Megalagrion
- Species: M. adytum

Binomial name
- Megalagrion adytum (Perkins, 1899)

Species of damselfly

Megalagrion adytum is a species of damselfly in the family Coenagrionidae that is endemic to Hawaii. Its natural habitat is swamps.
