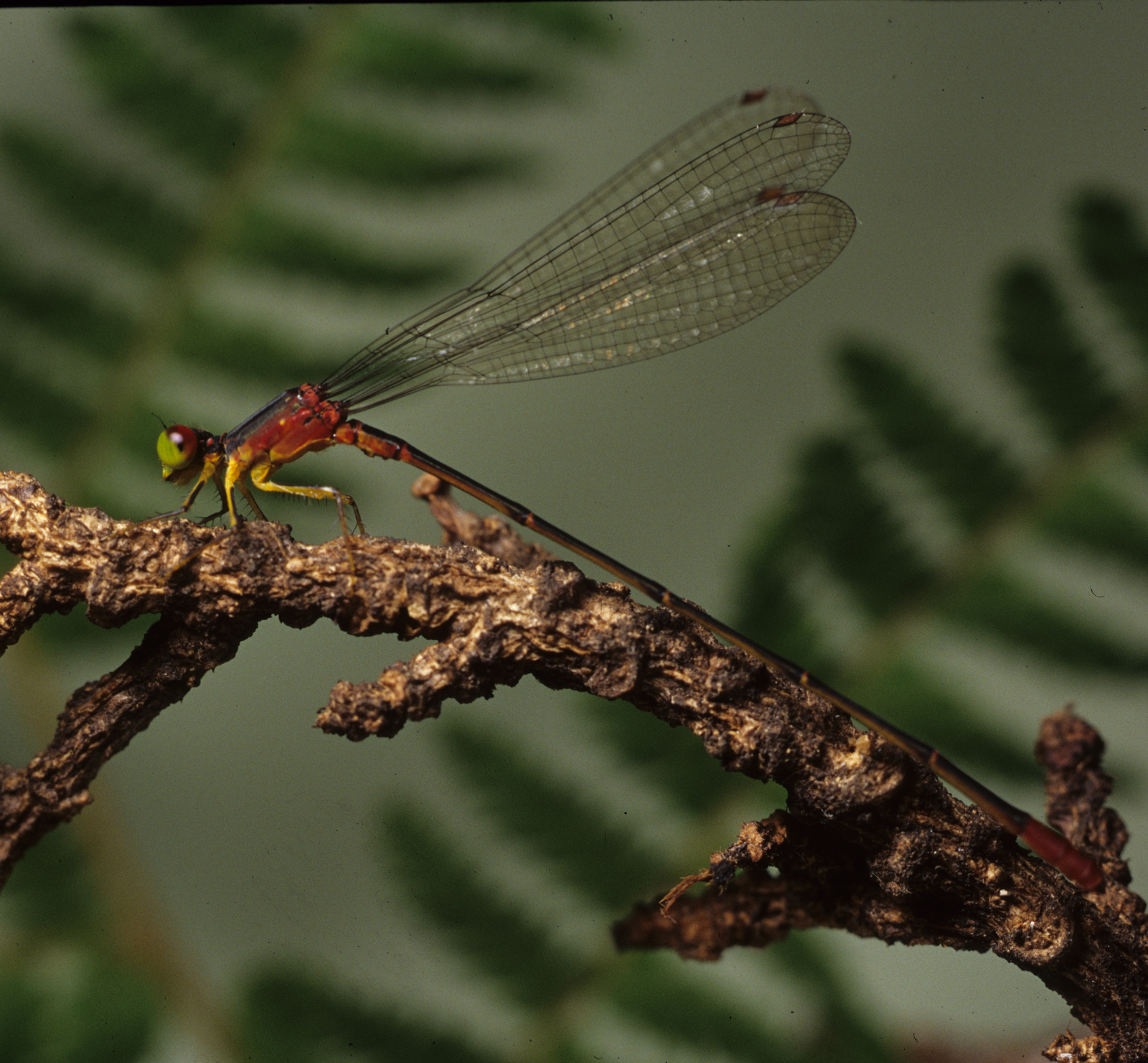

Conservation status
- Near Threatened (IUCN 3.1)

Scientific classification
- Kingdom: Animalia
- Phylum: Arthropoda
- Clade: Pancrustacea
- Class: Insecta
- Order: Odonata
- Suborder: Zygoptera
- Family: Coenagrionidae
- Genus: Megalagrion
- Species: M. nigrohamatum

Binomial name
- Megalagrion nigrohamatum (Blackburn, 1884)

= Megalagrion nigrohamatum =

Species of insect

Megalagrion nigrohamatum, also known as the blackline Hawaiian damselfly, is a species of damselfly in the family Coenagrionidae that is endemic to Hawaii.

Pinao is the Hawaiian word used to generally identify the damselfly and dragon fly species endemic to Hawai'i.

== Description ==
Adults may grow up to 45 mm in length and up to 50 mm wingspan wise.

== Ecology and habitat ==
Majority of the population reside along the Koʻolau Range of Oʻahu. Pools/streams with fish and frogs present prohibit the species from inhabiting these areas. Therefore, they reside above man-made and natural barriers like waterfalls or constructed water diversions, where its predators aren't present.

== Status ==
The Megalagrion nigrohamatum is listed as endangered on the state and federal level, due to the introduction of non-native frogs, fish, and birds.
