= Megalagrion oahuense =

Conservation status
- Vulnerable (IUCN 3.1)

Scientific classification
- Kingdom: Animalia
- Phylum: Arthropoda
- Class: Insecta
- Order: Odonata
- Suborder: Zygoptera
- Family: Coenagrionidae
- Genus: Megalagrion
- Species: M. oahuense

Binomial name
- Megalagrion oahuense (Blackburn, 1884)

Species of damselfly

Megalagrion oahuense is a species of damselfly in the family Coenagrionidae. It is endemic to Hawaii. It is the only known species of Zygoptera with terrestrial nymphs.
