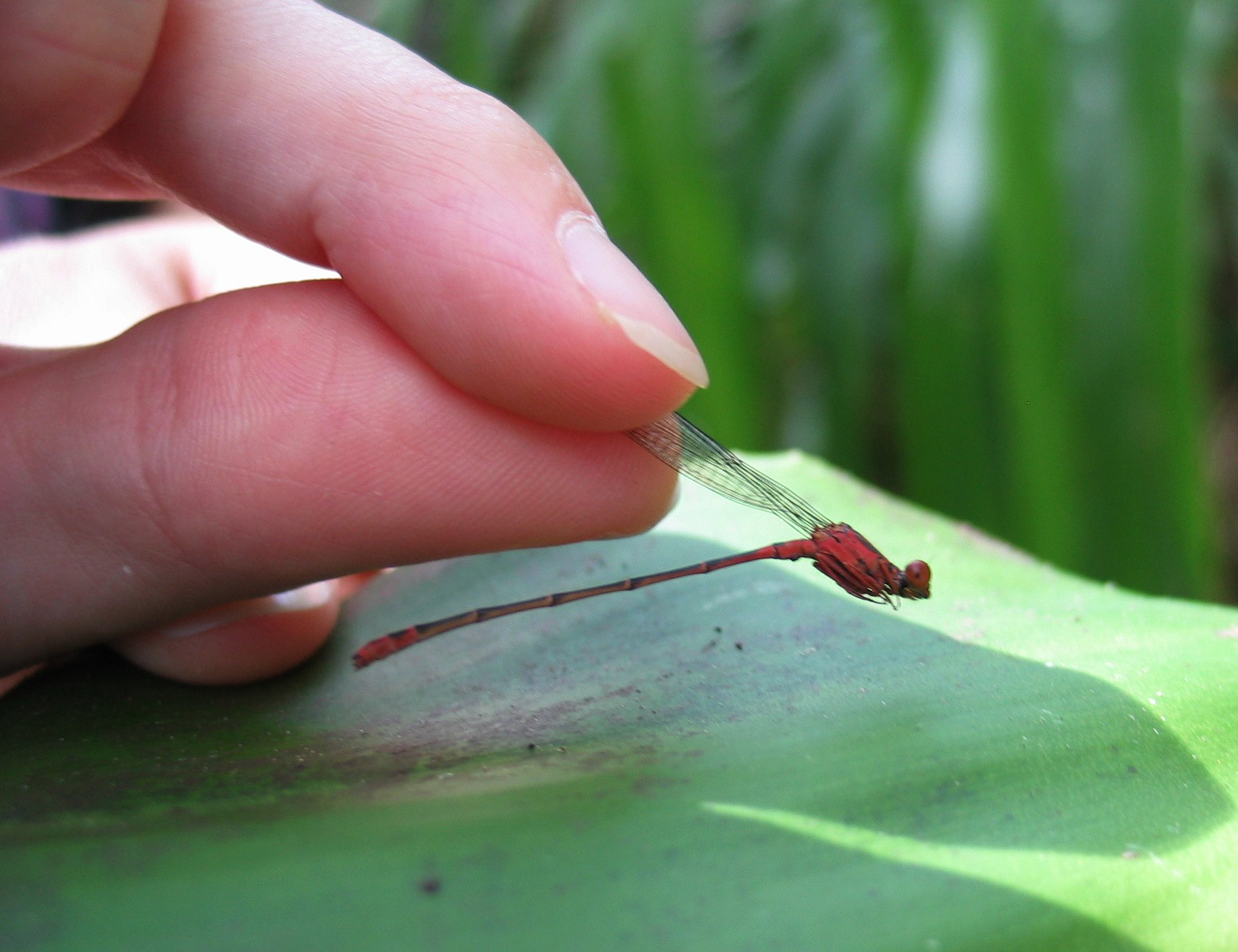

Conservation status
- Endangered (IUCN 3.1)

Scientific classification
- Kingdom: Animalia
- Phylum: Arthropoda
- Clade: Pancrustacea
- Class: Insecta
- Order: Odonata
- Suborder: Zygoptera
- Family: Coenagrionidae
- Genus: Megalagrion
- Species: M. xanthomelas

Binomial name
- Megalagrion xanthomelas (Selys, 1876)

= Megalagrion xanthomelas =

Species of damselfly

Megalagrion xanthomelas (orangeblack Hawaiian damselfly) is a species of damselfly in the order Odonata and the family Coenagrionidae. The species was first found by G. F. Matthew and described in 1876 by Selys-Longchamps. Classified as an endemic species, the orangeblack Hawaiian damselfly can only be found in the forests of the Hawaiian Islands. Derived from a freshwater ancestor, the genus Megalarion consists of very diversified groups of damselflies that can grow between the lengths of 33 to 37 millimeters. Megalagrion xanthomelas are commonly found in calm water sources throughout Hawaii including streams and ponds and is threatened by habitat loss. Anchialine ponds are a common habitat for Megalagrion xanthomelas to live in which requires the species to adapt to mechanisms of osmoregulation, which helps maintain their internal fluids when the surrounding salinity of the water fluctuates. Osmoregulation resulted in the species adapting behaviorally to finding habitats that have lower salinity levels. Osmoregulation leads to an increase in diversity within the species causing western coast populations to adapt and be less sensitive to higher salinity habitats, creating a salinity tolerance, while eastern coast populations lack a high salinity tolerance.

Since the genus Megalagrion is native to the Hawaiian Islands, the species has been exposed to adaptive radiation causing varieties within the species especially in color. Due to adaptive radiation within Hawaiian Megalagrion damselflies, species exhibit a variety of colors ranging from blue, green, yellow, orange, and red. Megalagrion xanthomelas have red males and brown females, thus the common name orangeblack Hawaiian damselfly. Megalagrion xanthomelas is classified as a sexually dimorphic species since male and female damselflies are different colors. There is an exception to this dimorphic characteristic which is when the species is located at a higher elevation than normal causing both males and females to be red. This kind of natural selection was created because the red pigmentation now found in both males and females protects the Orangeblack Hawaiian Damselflies from ultraviolet damage.

Around the early 1900s, Megalagrion xanthomelas was one of the most common species found on the Hawaiian Islands. After World War II, Megalagrion xanthomelas showed an extremely fast decline in population numbers, resulting in many Hawaiian Islands no longer being the home for any populations since the 1990s. In 1994, the species Megalagrion xanthomelas was placed on the List of Endangered and Threatened Wildlife in the Federal Register and protected under the Endangered Species Act. Later in 1996, Megalagrion xanthomelas was listed as a vulnerable species. This was the last time the species was assessed by the IUCN. The last time the orangeblack Hawaiian damselfly was assessed was on January 18, 2019 and the species was listed as an endangered species.

== Habitat ==
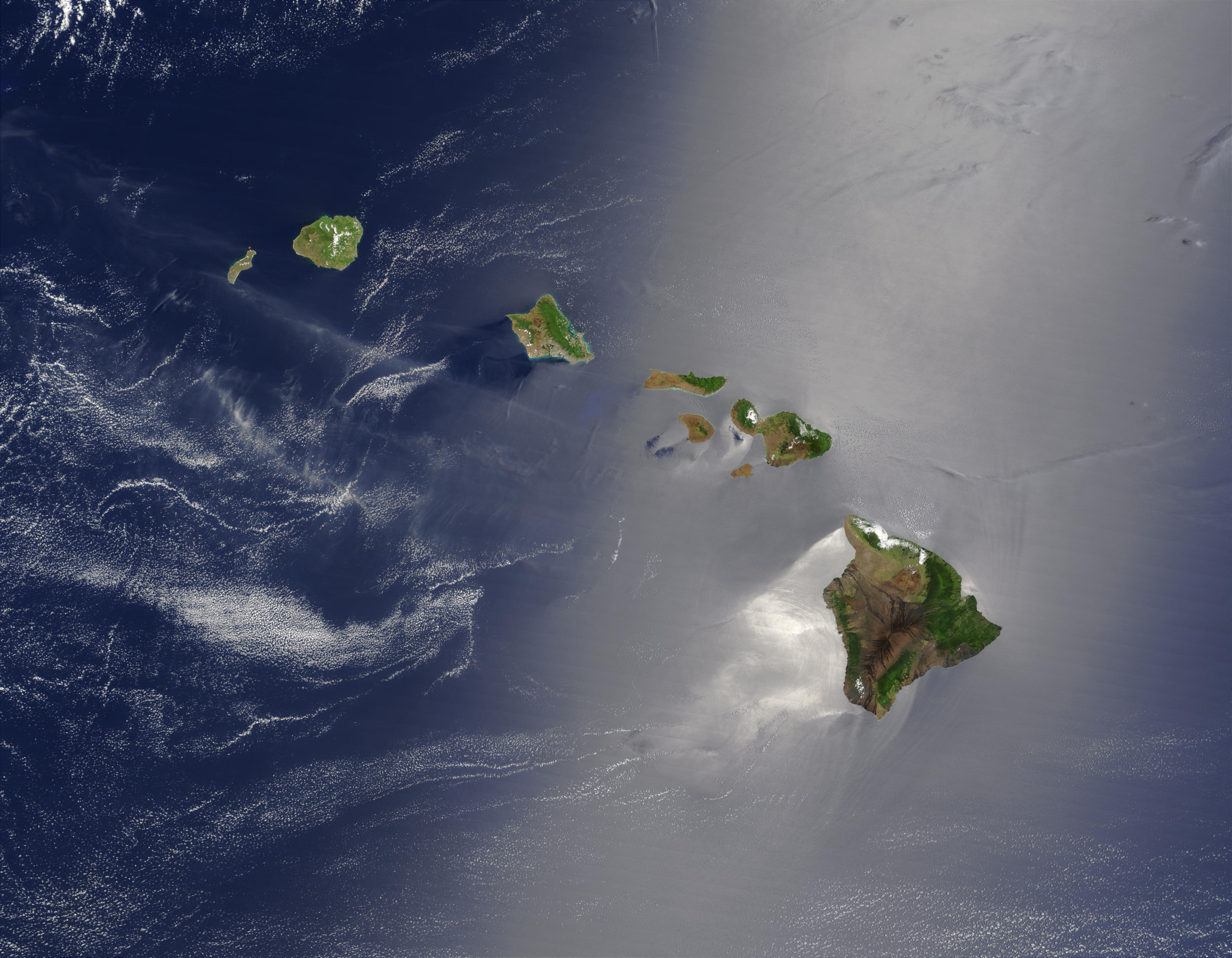
An image of the multiple islands that make up the state Hawaii

=== Common habitats ===
Megalagrion xanthomelas is commonly found near the coastal wetlands of the Hawaiian Islands. The species is also found in wetlands fed by basal springs and different levels of elevation throughout the Hawaiian Islands. Megalagrion xanthomelas is usually found between the range of 60 to 610 meters above sea level, with some populations recorded as high as 1000 meters above sea level. Megalagrion xanthomelas thrive in habitats that have tall Guinea grass lining the perimeter of the water source. Females will use the tall leaves of the Guinea grass to lay their eggs onto when mating while males perch on top of the leaves, waiting to chase out intruder males. The inlet of Pearl Harbor used to be a common habitat for the species Megalagrion xanthomelas. After World War II, Megalagrion xanthomelas declined in numbers over the years and is no longer present within the inlet of Pearl Harbor. The decrease in numbers is due to civilian and military airport traffic and housing constructed within the inlet to create a military base.

=== Anchialine ponds ===
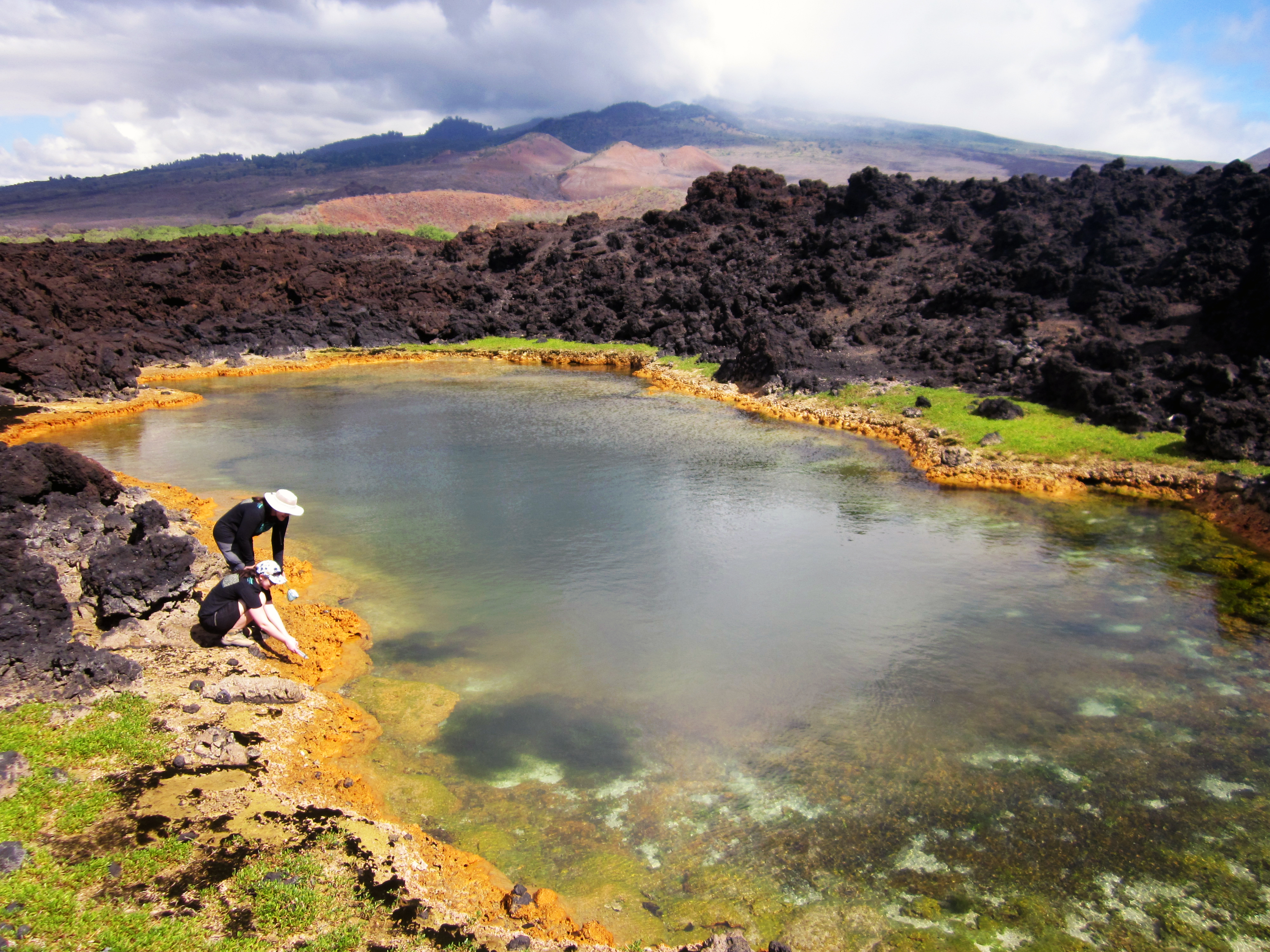
An example of an anchialine pond that many Megalagrion species, including Megalagrion xanthomelas, inhabit

Anchialine ponds are the most common habitat for Megalagrion xanthomelas since this type of water source is found in low-lying areas within the Hawaiian Islands. Anchialine ponds are created when a water source is contaminated with groundwater and has no direct connection with a larger body of water, like an ocean or a sea. Anchialine ponds are known for their salinity levels which can be caused by the mixing of groundwater with the original water source. Anchialine ponds have fluctuating salinity and temperature levels since these types of ponds are commonly found when there is a mixture of cold freshwater and warm saltwater. Temperature and salinity are two major components that factor how well a population will survive and flourish within their environment.

=== Salinity levels ===
Salinity is the most powerful component out of the two since freshwater recharge, like precipitation, and evaporation can change the level of salinity causing it to fluctuate. The average annual rainfall within the Hawaiian Islands is about 300 centimeters which could impact the salinity levels within anchialine ponds. The average salinity of east coast anchialine ponds is held around 3.5 ppt while west coast anchialine ponds have a salinity held at about 7.0 ppt. With varying levels of salinity and the possibility of salinity levels fluctuating, populations within the species Megalagrion xanthomelas have adapted to live within different levels of salinity.

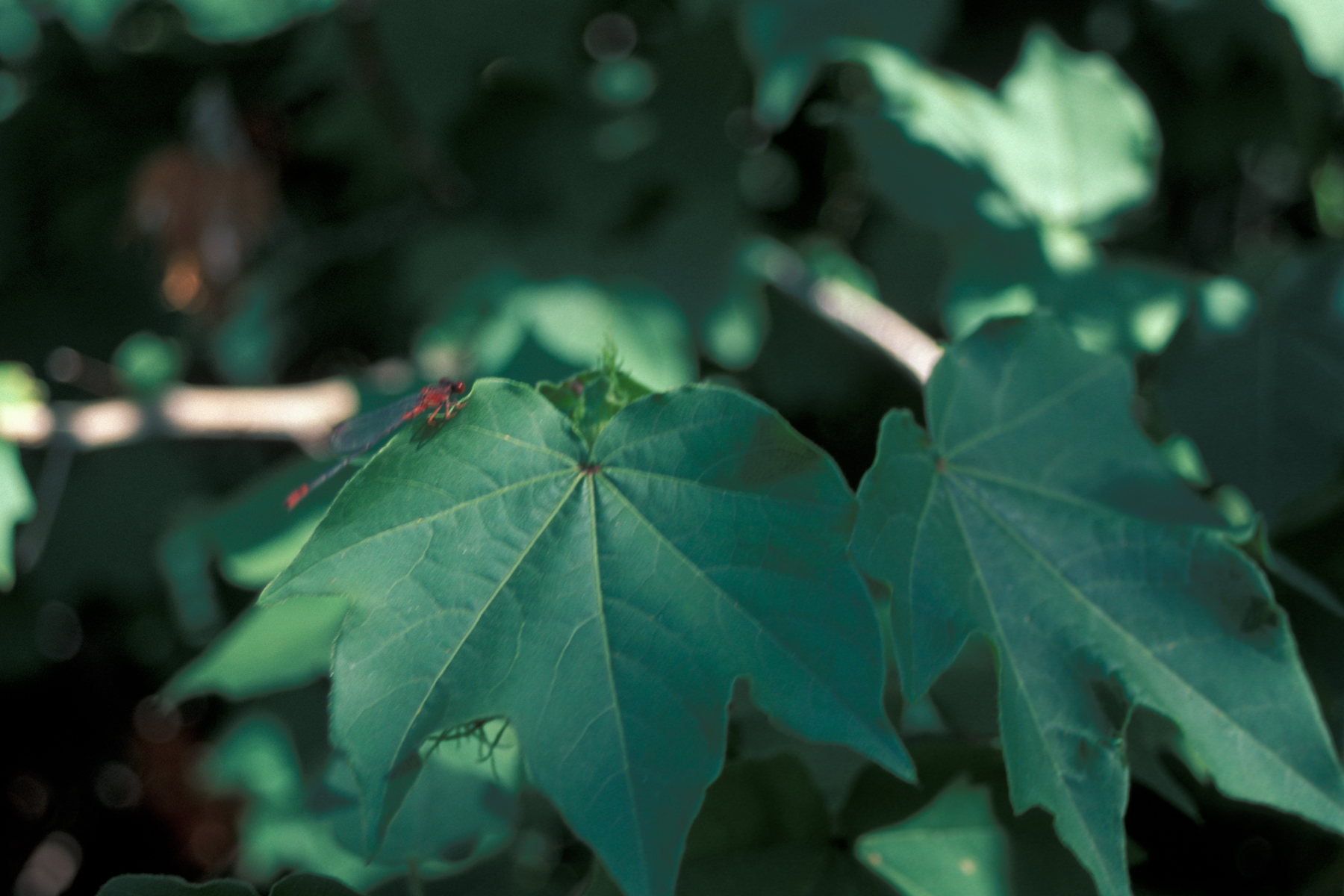
Megalagrion xanthomelas perching on a maple leaf

=== Introduction of other species ===
Megalagrion xanthomelas live within the same habitat shared by already existing species of dragonflies and damselflies along with other introduced species on the Hawaiian Islands. "Other species of dragonflies and damselflies that the Orangeblack Hawaiian Damselfly shares a habitat with are Ischnura posita, Tramea abdominalis, and Pantala flavescens". All three of these dragonfly and damselfly species do not affect the survival rate of the orangeblack Hawaiian damselfly. Over the past century, different species of poeciliid fish have been added to water sources within the orangeblack Hawaiian damselfly's habitat. The appearances of these fish species have resulted in the decline of population numbers within these Hawaiian Island habitats.

== Life cycle ==
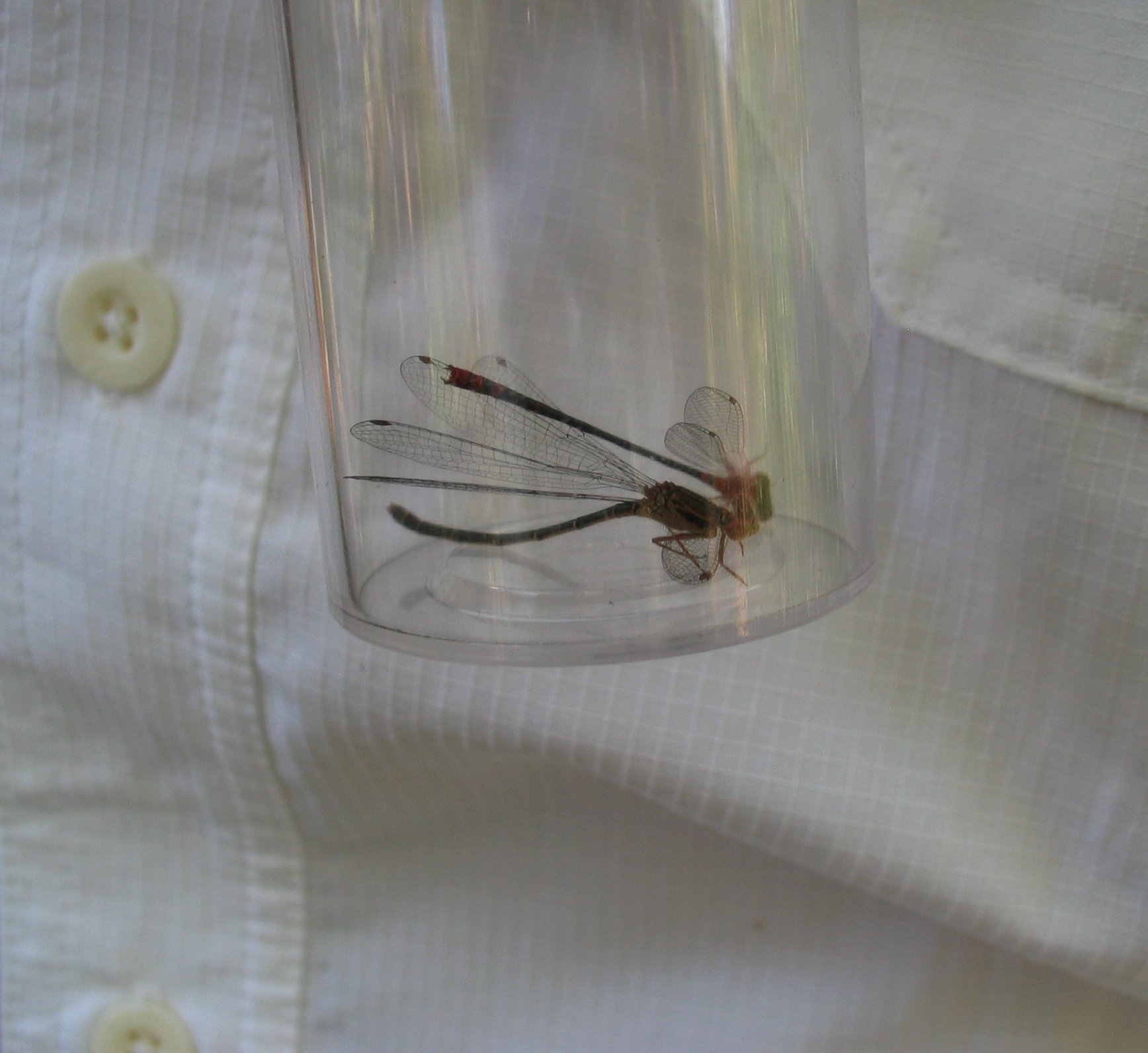
A comparison between the different colors of a male and female Megalagrion xanthomelas. The red male is located above the brown female.

The life cycle of Megalagrion xanthomelas is done fully within water sources that have a salinity level lower than 8 ppt (Tango). The order Odonata, including Megalagrion xanthomelas, undergo incomplete metamorphosis within their life cycles. The life cycle of the Megalagrion xanthomelas contains four stages. The first stage of the life cycle is the egg stage which lasts about 21 days before the larva emerges. Next, is the pre-larva which takes anywhere between 11 and 17 days to complete. The third stage is the naiad. Naiads can develop from a range of 103 to 111 days. The last stage is the adult, which is the only stage that does not require water to be completed. When females lay their eggs, they lay their eggs fully submerged within aquatic plants. When the eggs are laid, they are covered by an outer shell called a chorion. The chorion provides a structure that allows for the intake of oxygen while preventing any level of salinity from entering and killing the baby organism inside. After the life cycle is completed, the adult stage of Megalagrion xanthomelas can decide on looking for another habitat to reproduce in or staying near the water source itself emerged from.

== Environmental problems ==
=== Urbanization ===
Megalagrion xanthomelas is a species particularly vulnerable to any type of habitat degradation or alteration. Habitat degradation can be caused by urbanization, resulting in Megalagrion xanthomelas being forced into smaller habitat areas. Megalagrion xanthomelas used to be so abundant back in the 1800s that fields and any shallow water source would be swarmed with orangeblack Hawaiian damselflies. During the 20th century, urbanization eroded the natural habitats supplied by the Hawaiian Islands. Water sources were channelized, filled, or turned into mangroves which led to a decrease in water quality for many species, including Megalagrion xanthomelas. The attack on Pearl Harbor contributed to the decline of Megalagrion xanthomelas population numbers. The inlet of Pearl Harbor used to be shallow and housed many species, but by the end of World War II, the inlet turned into a civilian and military airport and community. Later, further degradation occurred in the area when the Veterans Administration ordered for the construction of the Pearl Harbor Memorial. This construction led to the elimination of any remaining populations of Megalagrion xanthomelas and an increase in the salinity level within the inlet.

=== Invasive species ===
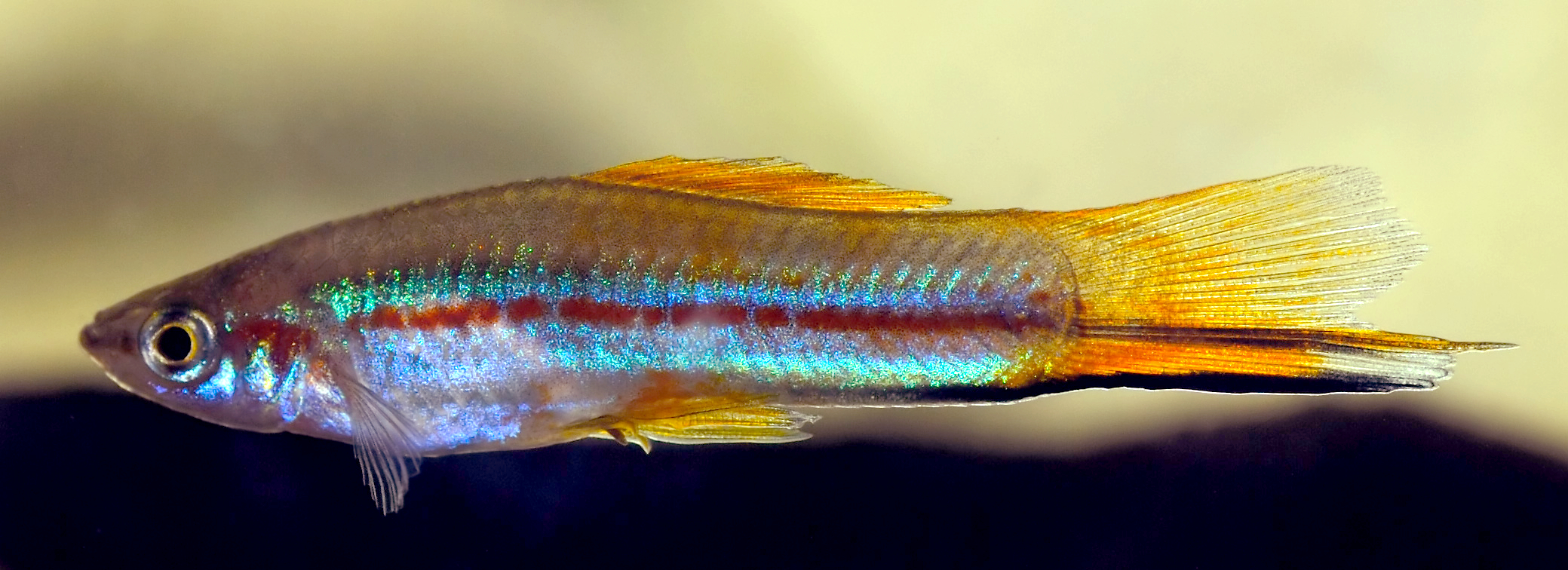
Xiphophorus helleri is an invasive predator species of the Megalagrion xanthomelas.

The introduction of invasive species has been a major threat to most aquatic habitats within the Hawaiian Islands and has been the main cause of the decline in population numbers for Megalagrion xanthomelas. Invasive fish species that are introduced to the Hawaiian Island habitats have increased the vulnerability of many Odonata species, including Megalagrion xanthomelas. "Some of these invasive fish species include Xiphophorus helleri, Poecilia mexicana, Poecilia reticulata, and Gambusia". Populations of Megalagrion xanthomelas are higher in areas without any introduction of invasive fish species compared to areas that have invasive fish species. Megalagrion xanthomelas can survive with the presence of some invasive species including carp and apple snails. The introduction of invasive species does not only introduce predators into the environment but also introduces new diseases and parasites to which native species, like Megalagrion xanthomelas, have no resistance.

=== Weather ===
Megalagrion xanthomelas is extremely sensitive to increased salinity levels and any fluctuation outside the normal range of salinity, which can lead to a decline in population numbers. Anchialine ponds, which are the most common habitat for orangeblack Hawaiian damselflies, are very susceptible to increased groundwater withdrawals leading to an increase in the salinity level. An increase in salinity level results in an increase in osmolarity, creating a higher demand for osmoregulation. The survival of naiads starts to decrease since this stage of the life cycle no longer has a chorion or the ability to osmoregulate. If naiads do not survive, then whole populations have the potential to be wiped out before the adults have a chance to breed again.

== Conservation methods ==
=== Research studies ===
There has been very little research completed on the species Megalagrion xanthomelas. Scant information is available on the orangeblack Hawaiian damselfly, making it difficult to learn how the species behaves, functions within its habitat, and how to better protect this endangered species from becoming extinct. To help protect the orangeblack Hawaiian damselfly from extinction, baseline research needs to be conducted and completed so conservation biologists, or anyone who wants to help protect this species, has the right information. Comparative studies between the responses of younger and older life stages to the salinity level of the water source can help determine what information is needed to increase their survival rate within their habitat. Focus primarily on the naiad since that stage of the life cycle is completed in the water and has no way to osmoregulate or protect itself from the high salinity levels that might occur within its habitat.

=== Habitat stability ===
The habitat for Megalagrion xanthomelas is commonly anchialine ponds that are very susceptible to pollution, degradation, alteration, and the introduction of invasive species. Pollutants and sediment pushed into water sources around construction sites and roads results in poor water quality in orangeblack Hawaiian damselfly habitats. To ensure the habitat is sufficient for them to reproduce and create more anchialine populations, strong conservation measures to preserve anchialine pond water quality and quantity are necessary. Environmental degradation of orangeblack Hawaiian damselfly habitats also occurs due to urbanization, i.e. constructing developments or roads into their habitats. Urbanization decreases habitat size, resulting in populations of Megalagrion xanthomelas being confined into small areas not suitable for their species or number. Confining them within a smaller habitat area makes them more susceptible to predators and invasive species. If there are too many different types of invasive species within the original habitat for Megalagrion xanthomelas, the best conservation method is to relocate the populations since invasive species are hard to maintain and eradicate once they are established. Whether the orangeblack Hawaiian damselfly is relocated to another natural anchialine pond or an artificially made one, the species will be able to reestablish itself without the influence of invasive species.
