= P. maculata =

P. maculata may refer to:

- Panorpodes maculata, a jewel beetle
- Paragorgopis maculata, a picture-winged fly
- Paralopostega maculata, a moth endemic to Hawaii
- Parapercis maculata, a ray-finned fish
- Parasiccia maculata, an Asian moth
- Parasikukia maculata, a fish endemic to Thailand
- Parias maculata, a venomous pitviper
- Parochetus maculata, a plant with blue flowers
- Paropsis maculata, a tortoise beetle
- Paroreomyza maculata, a bird endemic to Oahu
- Pegomya maculata, a calyptrate muscoid
- Pempelia maculata, a snout moth
- Penicillaria maculata, an owlet moth
- Pentila maculata, an African butterfly
- Percina maculata, a roughbelly darter
- Peristeria maculata, a New World orchid
- Persicaria maculata, an annual plant
- Persicula maculata, a sea snail
- Phlox maculata, a flowering plant
- Phycodes maculata, an Indian moth
- Phyllonorycter maculata, a Japanese moth
- Phymata maculata, an ambush bug
- Pinctada maculata, a pearl oyster
- Pionycha maculata, a ground beetle
- Piruna maculata, a skipper butterfly
- Planaria maculata, a planariid triclad
- Planigale maculata, a marsupial mouse
- Platnickina maculata, a tangle-web spider
- Platysticta maculata, a closed wing damselfly
- Platythelphusa maculata, a freshwater crab
- Pleione maculata, a Himalayan crocus
- Pleurobranchaea maculata, a side-gill slug
- Pleurothallis maculata, a tropical orchid
- Polycarpa maculata, a tunicate with a folded pharyngeal basket
- Polyortha maculata, an Ecuadorean moth
- Polystachya maculata, an orchid endemic to Burundi
- Pomacea maculata, an apple snail
- Ponthieva maculata, a New World orchid
- Porcellana maculata, a porcelain crab
- Portevinia maculata, a European hoverfly
- Posterobranchaea maculata, a headshield slug
- Potentilla maculata, a herbaceous plant
- Potiaete maculata, a longhorn beetle
- Procapperia maculata, an Old World moth
- Prosartes maculata, a perennial plant
- Protolychnis maculata, a long-horned moth
- Psathyrella maculata, a dark-spored agaric
- Pseudacris maculata, a chorus frog
- Pseudaneitea maculata, a leaf-veined slug
- Pseudofentonia maculata, an owlet moth
- Pseudomantis maculata, a praying mantis
- Pseudomonnea maculata, a ground beetle
- Pseudostomatella maculata, a sea snail
- Psiloptera maculata, a jewel beetle
- Pterocalla maculata, a picture-winged fly
- Puya maculata, a plant endemic to Ecuador
- Pyrrhalta maculata, a leaf beetle
