= Pentila bennetti =

Scientific classification
- Domain: Eukaryota
- Kingdom: Animalia
- Phylum: Arthropoda
- Class: Insecta
- Order: Lepidoptera
- Family: Lycaenidae
- Genus: Pentila
- Species: P. bennetti

Binomial name
- Pentila bennetti Collins & Larsen, 2003

Species of butterfly

Pentila bennetti is a butterfly in the family Lycaenidae. It is found in Guinea. The habitat consists of forests.
