= Pentila =

Buff butterflies
- African Poritiinae; most of the species in this image are or have been in Pentila

Scientific classification
- Kingdom: Animalia
- Phylum: Arthropoda
- Clade: Pancrustacea
- Class: Insecta
- Order: Lepidoptera
- Family: Lycaenidae
- Tribe: Liptenini
- Genus: Pentila; Westwood, [1851]

Synonyms
- Tingra Boisduval, 1847

Butterfly genus in family Lycaenidae

Pentila is a genus of butterflies, commonly called pentilas or buffs, in the family Lycaenidae. The species of this genus are endemic to the Afrotropics. For other butterflies called buffs, see genus Baliochila.

== Species ==
Listed alphabetically:

- Pentila abraxas Westwood, 1852
- Pentila alba Dewitz, 1886
- Pentila amenaida Hewitson, 1873
- Pentila amenaidoides (Holland, 1893)
- Pentila auga Karsch, 1895
- Pentila bennetti Collins & Larsen, 2003
- Pentila bitje Druce, 1910
- Pentila camerunica Stempffer & Bennett, 1961
- Pentila carcassoni Stempffer & Bennett, 1961
- Pentila christina Suffert, 1904
- Pentila cloetensi Aurivillius, 1898
- Pentila condamini Stempffer, 1963
- Pentila fallax Bethune-Baker, 1915
- Pentila fidonioides Schultze, 1923
- Pentila glagoessa (Holland, 1893)
- Pentila hewitsoni (Grose-Smith & Kirby, 1887)
- Pentila inconspicua Druce, 1910 – inconspicuous pentila
- Pentila landbecki Stempffer & Bennett, 1961
- Pentila maculata (Kirby, 1887)
- Pentila mesia Hulstaert, 1924
- Pentila nero (Grose-Smith & Kirby, 1894)
- Pentila nigeriana Stempffer & Bennett, 1961
- Pentila occidentalium Aurivillius, 1899
- Pentila pauli Staudinger, 1888 – Paul's buff
- Pentila petreia Hewitson, 1874
- Pentila petreoides Bethune-Baker, 1915
- Pentila phidia Hewitson, 1874
- Pentila picena Hewitson, 1874
- Pentila preussi Staudinger, 1888
- Pentila pseudorotha Stempffer & Bennett, 1961
- Pentila rogersi (Druce, 1907) – Rogers' pentila
- Pentila rondo Kielland, 1990
- Pentila rotha Hewitson, 1873
- Pentila subfuscata Hawker-Smith, 1933
- Pentila swynnertoni Stevenson, 1940
- Pentila tachyroides Dewitz, 1879 – mylothrid pentila
- Pentila torrida (Kirby, 1887)
- Pentila tropicalis (Boisduval, 1847) – tropical pentila, spotted buff
- Pentila umangiana Aurivillius, 1898
- Pentila umbra Holland, 1892
