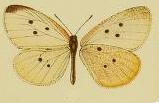

Scientific classification
- Domain: Eukaryota
- Kingdom: Animalia
- Phylum: Arthropoda
- Class: Insecta
- Order: Lepidoptera
- Family: Lycaenidae
- Genus: Pentila
- Species: P. bitje

Binomial name
- Pentila bitje H. H. Druce, 1910

= Pentila bitje =

Species of butterfly

Pentila bitje is a butterfly in the family Lycaenidae first described by Hamilton Herbert Druce in 1910. It is found in southern Cameroon, the Republic of the Congo and Equatorial Guinea. The habitat consists of forests.
