= Pterocalla =

Scientific classification
- Domain: Eukaryota
- Kingdom: Animalia
- Phylum: Arthropoda
- Class: Insecta
- Order: Diptera
- Family: Ulidiidae
- Subfamily: Ulidiinae
- Tribe: Pterocallini
- Genus: Pterocalla; Rondani, 1848

Genus of flies

Pterocalla is a genus of picture-winged flies in the family Ulidiidae.

== Species ==
- Pterocalla amazonica
- Pterocalla angustipennis
- Pterocalla bella
- Pterocalla costalis
- Pterocalla guttulata
- Pterocalla maculata
- Pterocalla nitidiventris
- Pterocalla oculata
- Pterocalla ophthalmoptera
- Pterocalla pennata
- Pterocalla pentophthalma
- Pterocalla plumitarsis
- Pterocalla proxima
- Pterocalla punctata
- Pterocalla quadrata
- Pterocalla radiata
- Pterocalla reticulata
- Pterocalla scutellata
- Pterocalla striata
- Pterocalla strigula
- Pterocalla undulata
