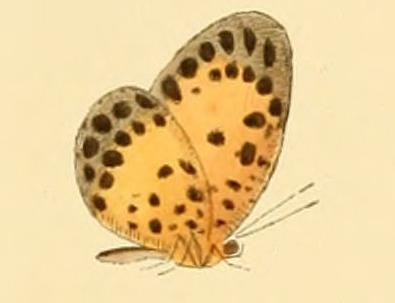

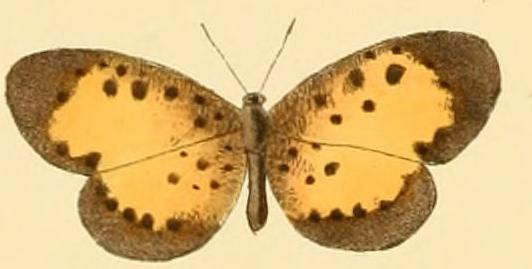

Scientific classification
- Domain: Eukaryota
- Kingdom: Animalia
- Phylum: Arthropoda
- Class: Insecta
- Order: Lepidoptera
- Family: Lycaenidae
- Genus: Pentila
- Species: P. rotha

Binomial name
- Pentila rotha Hewitson, 1873

Synonyms
- Pentila marianna Suffert, 1904

= Pentila rotha =

Species of butterfly

Pentila rotha is a butterfly in the family Lycaenidae. It is found in Cameroon, Gabon and the Republic of the Congo.

== Subspecies ==
- Pentila rotha rotha (Gabon, Republic of the Congo)
- Pentila rotha marianna Suffert, 1904 (Cameroon)
