= Polyortha =

Scientific classification
- Domain: Eukaryota
- Kingdom: Animalia
- Phylum: Arthropoda
- Class: Insecta
- Order: Lepidoptera
- Family: Tortricidae
- Tribe: Polyorthini
- Genus: Polyortha; Dognin, 1905

Species
- See text

Genus of tortrix moths

Polyortha is a genus of moths belonging to the family Tortricidae.

== Species ==
- Polyortha atroperla Razowski, 1980
- Polyortha biezankoi Becker, 1970
- Polyortha bryographa Meyrick, 1909
- Polyortha bryometalla Meyrick, 1932
- Polyortha chiriquitana Zeller, 1877
- Polyortha chlamydata Dognin, 1912
- Polyortha clarkeana Razowski, 1984
- Polyortha euchlorana Walsingham, 1914
- Polyortha evestigana Razowski, 1984
- Polyortha glaucotes Walsingham, 1914
- Polyortha gradatulana Zeller, 1866
- Polyortha halianassa Meyrick, 1932
- Polyortha larocae Razowski & Becker, 1981
- Polyortha lyncurion Razowski, 1980
- Polyortha maculata Razowski, 1999
- Polyortha magnifica Walsingham, 1914
- Polyortha marmarodes Meyrick, 1912
- Polyortha myoxa Razowski, 1984
- Polyortha naevifera Razowski, 1984
- Polyortha nigriguttata Walsingham, 1914
- Polyortha niveopunctata Dognin, 1905
- Polyortha paranae Razowski & Becker, 1981
- Polyortha purpurascens Meyrick, 1912
- Polyortha radiata Razowski & Becker, 1981
- Polyortha sagax Razowski, 1984
- Polyortha suffalcata Walsingham, 1914
- Polyortha symphyla Razowski, 1984
- Polyortha tersa Walsingham, 1914
- Polyortha thammiana Zeller, 1877
- Polyortha trochilodes Meyrick, 1912
