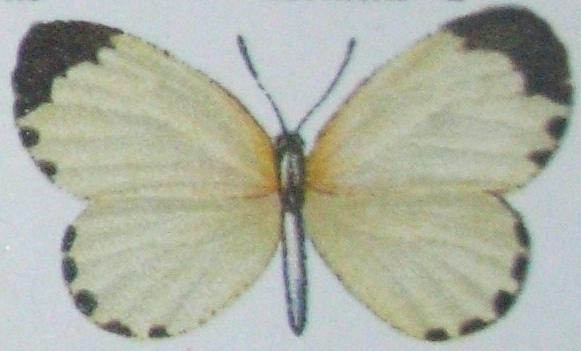

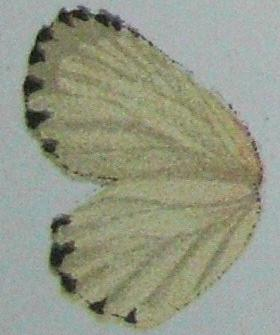

Scientific classification
- Kingdom: Animalia
- Phylum: Arthropoda
- Class: Insecta
- Order: Lepidoptera
- Family: Lycaenidae
- Genus: Pentila
- Species: P. tachyroides

Binomial name
- Pentila tachyroides Dewitz, 1879

Synonyms
- Tingra mylothrina Butler, 1888; Pentila tochyroides roidesta Suffert, 1904

= Pentila tachyroides =

Species of butterfly

Pentila tachyroides, the mylothrid pentila, is a butterfly in the family Lycaenidae. It is found in Nigeria, Cameroon, Gabon, the Republic of the Congo, Angola, the Democratic Republic of the Congo, Uganda, Kenya and Tanzania. The habitat consists of forests.

Adults are on wing in November and December.

== Subspecies ==
- Pentila tachyroides tachyroides (southern Nigeria, Cameroon, Gabon, Congo, Angola, Democratic Republic of the Congo, Uganda, western Kenya, north-western Tanzania)
- Pentila tachyroides isiro Berger, 1981 (Democratic Republic of the Congo: Mongala, Uele, Ituri, Kivu, Tshuapa, Equateur and Sankuru)
