= Polyortha purpurascens =

Scientific classification
- Kingdom: Animalia
- Phylum: Arthropoda
- Class: Insecta
- Order: Lepidoptera
- Family: Tortricidae
- Genus: Polyortha
- Species: P. purpurascens

Binomial name
- Polyortha purpurascens (Meyrick, 1912)

Synonyms
- Peronea purpurascens Meyrick, 1912

Species of moth

Polyortha purpurascens is a species of moth of the family Tortricidae. It is found in Peru.
