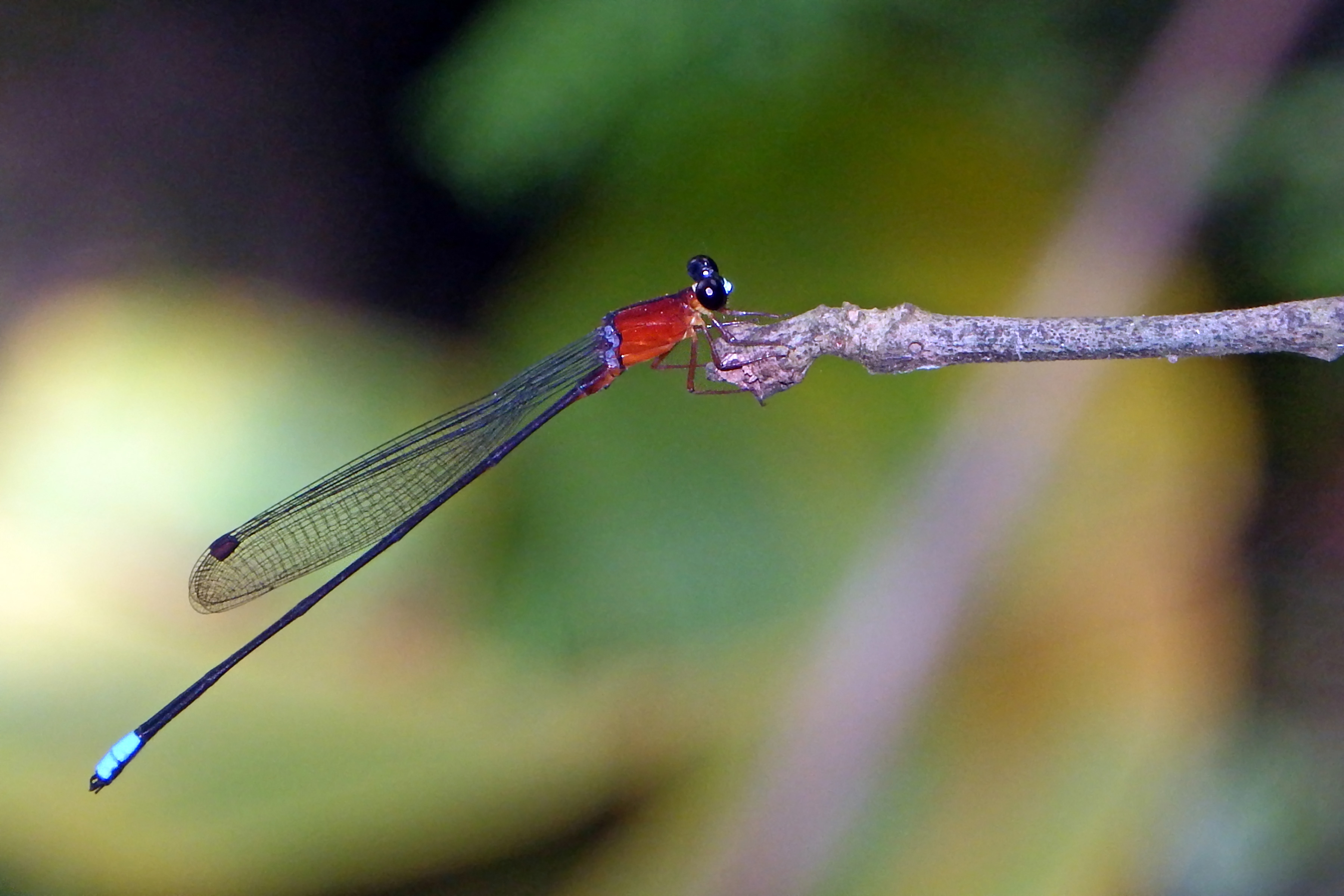
- Platysticta deccanensis

Scientific classification
- Kingdom: Animalia
- Phylum: Arthropoda
- Clade: Pancrustacea
- Class: Insecta
- Order: Odonata
- Suborder: Zygoptera
- Family: Platystictidae
- Subfamily: Platystictinae
- Genus: Platysticta; Selys, 1860

= Platysticta =

Genus of damselflies

Platysticta is a genus of shadowdamsels in the damselfly family Platystictidae, and subfamily Platystictinae. Species of Platysticta are slender forest damselflies endemic to Sri Lanka, where they inhabit shaded streams in tropical rainforest.

== Description ==
Species of Platysticta are slender damselflies with narrow wings and elongated abdomens. Like other members of Platystictidae, they are typically associated with shaded forest streams and often have very restricted geographic ranges.

== Species ==
The following species are currently placed in Platysticta:

- Platysticta apicalis Kirby, 1893
- Platysticta maculata Hagen in Selys, 1860
- Platysticta secreta Bedjanic & van Tol, 2016
- Platysticta serendibica Bedjanic & van Tol, 2016

== Etymology ==
The genus name Platysticta is presumably derived from the Greek πλατύς (platys, "broad") and στικτός (stiktos, "marked"). The name likely alludes to the broad pterostigma, the distinctive "wing mark" emphasised by Selys when he established the genus.
