= Polyortha bryographa =

Scientific classification
- Kingdom: Animalia
- Phylum: Arthropoda
- Class: Insecta
- Order: Lepidoptera
- Family: Tortricidae
- Genus: Polyortha
- Species: P. bryographa

Binomial name
- Polyortha bryographa (Meyrick, 1909)

Synonyms
- Peronea bryographa Meyrick, 1909

Species of moth

Polyortha bryographa is a species of moth of the family Tortricidae. It is found in Peru.
