= Pterocalla reticulata =

Scientific classification
- Domain: Eukaryota
- Kingdom: Animalia
- Phylum: Arthropoda
- Class: Insecta
- Order: Diptera
- Family: Ulidiidae
- Genus: Pterocalla
- Species: P. reticulata

Binomial name
- Pterocalla reticulata Hendel, 1909

Species of fly

Pterocalla reticulata is a species of ulidiid or picture-winged fly in the genus Pterocalla of the family Ulidiidae.
