= Pentila rondo =

Scientific classification
- Kingdom: Animalia
- Phylum: Arthropoda
- Class: Insecta
- Order: Lepidoptera
- Family: Lycaenidae
- Genus: Pentila
- Species: P. rondo

Binomial name
- Pentila rondo Kielland, 1990

Species of butterfly

Pentila rondo is a butterfly in the family Lycaenidae. It is found in Tanzania (south-eastern part of the country to the Rondo Plateau and the area west of Lindi). The habitat consists of forests at altitudes ranging from 800 to 850 metres.

The length of the forewings is 16–17.2 mm for males and 16.9-18.3 mm for females. Adults have been recorded on wing in February and April.
