= Polyortha biezankoi =

Scientific classification
- Domain: Eukaryota
- Kingdom: Animalia
- Phylum: Arthropoda
- Class: Insecta
- Order: Lepidoptera
- Family: Tortricidae
- Genus: Polyortha
- Species: P. biezankoi

Binomial name
- Polyortha biezankoi Becker, 1970

Species of moth

Polyortha biezankoi is a species of moth of the family Tortricidae. It is found in Brazil.
