= Polyortha sagax =

Scientific classification
- Domain: Eukaryota
- Kingdom: Animalia
- Phylum: Arthropoda
- Class: Insecta
- Order: Lepidoptera
- Family: Tortricidae
- Genus: Polyortha
- Species: P. sagax

Binomial name
- Polyortha sagax Razowski, 1984

Species of moth

Polyortha sagax is a species of moth of the family Tortricidae. It is found in Bolivia.
