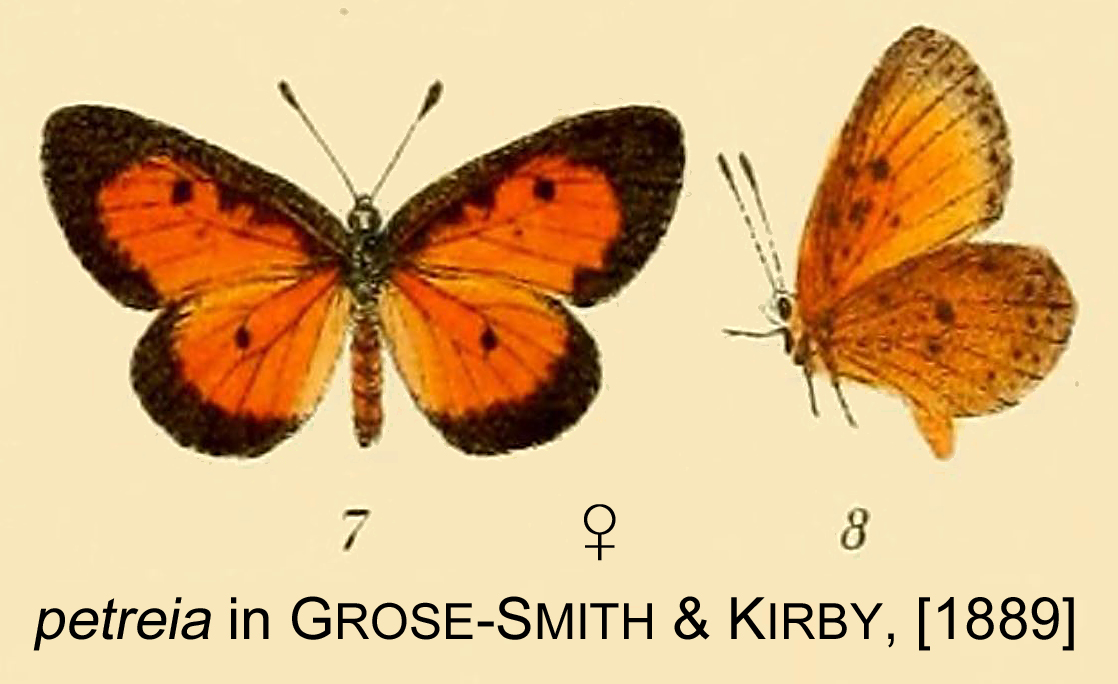

Scientific classification
- Kingdom: Animalia
- Phylum: Arthropoda
- Clade: Pancrustacea
- Class: Insecta
- Order: Lepidoptera
- Family: Lycaenidae
- Genus: Pentila
- Species: P. petreia

Binomial name
- Pentila petreia Hewitson, 1874

Synonyms
- Tingra tripunctata Druce, 1888

= Pentila petreia =

Species of butterfly

Pentila petreia, the common red pentila, is a butterfly in the family Lycaenidae. It is found in Sierra Leone, central Liberia, Ivory Coast, Ghana, Togo, Benin and western Nigeria. The habitat consists of dense forests.

Adults feed from extrafloral nectaries.

Torben Larsen developed a species numbering system for his 2005 publication Butterflies of West Africa. This species is #147. The 'Larsen' numbers have since been used with permission in A Sharp Eye on Butterflies of Ghana.
