= Paragorgopis discrepans =

Scientific classification
- Kingdom: Animalia
- Phylum: Arthropoda
- Clade: Pancrustacea
- Class: Insecta
- Order: Diptera
- Family: Ulidiidae
- Genus: Paragorgopis
- Species: P. discrepans

Binomial name
- Paragorgopis discrepans Hendel, 1914

Species of fly

Paragorgopis discrepans is a species of ulidiid or picture-winged fly in the genus Paragorgopis of the family Ulidiidae.
