= Pentila subfuscata =

Scientific classification
- Kingdom: Animalia
- Phylum: Arthropoda
- Class: Insecta
- Order: Lepidoptera
- Family: Lycaenidae
- Genus: Pentila
- Species: P. subfuscata

Binomial name
- Pentila subfuscata Hawker-Smith, 1933

Species of butterfly

Pentila subfuscata is a butterfly in the family Lycaenidae. It is found in Kasai and Lualaba in the Democratic Republic of the Congo.
