= Platysticta serendibica =

Scientific classification
- Domain: Eukaryota
- Kingdom: Animalia
- Phylum: Arthropoda
- Class: Insecta
- Order: Odonata
- Suborder: Zygoptera
- Family: Platystictidae
- Genus: Platysticta
- Species: P. serendibica

Binomial name
- Platysticta serendibica Bedjanic & van Tol, 2016

Species of damselfly

The Platysticta serendibica is a species of damselfly in the family Platystictidae. It is endemic to wet zone forests of Kanneliya area, Sri Lanka.

== See also ==
- List of odonates of Sri Lanka
