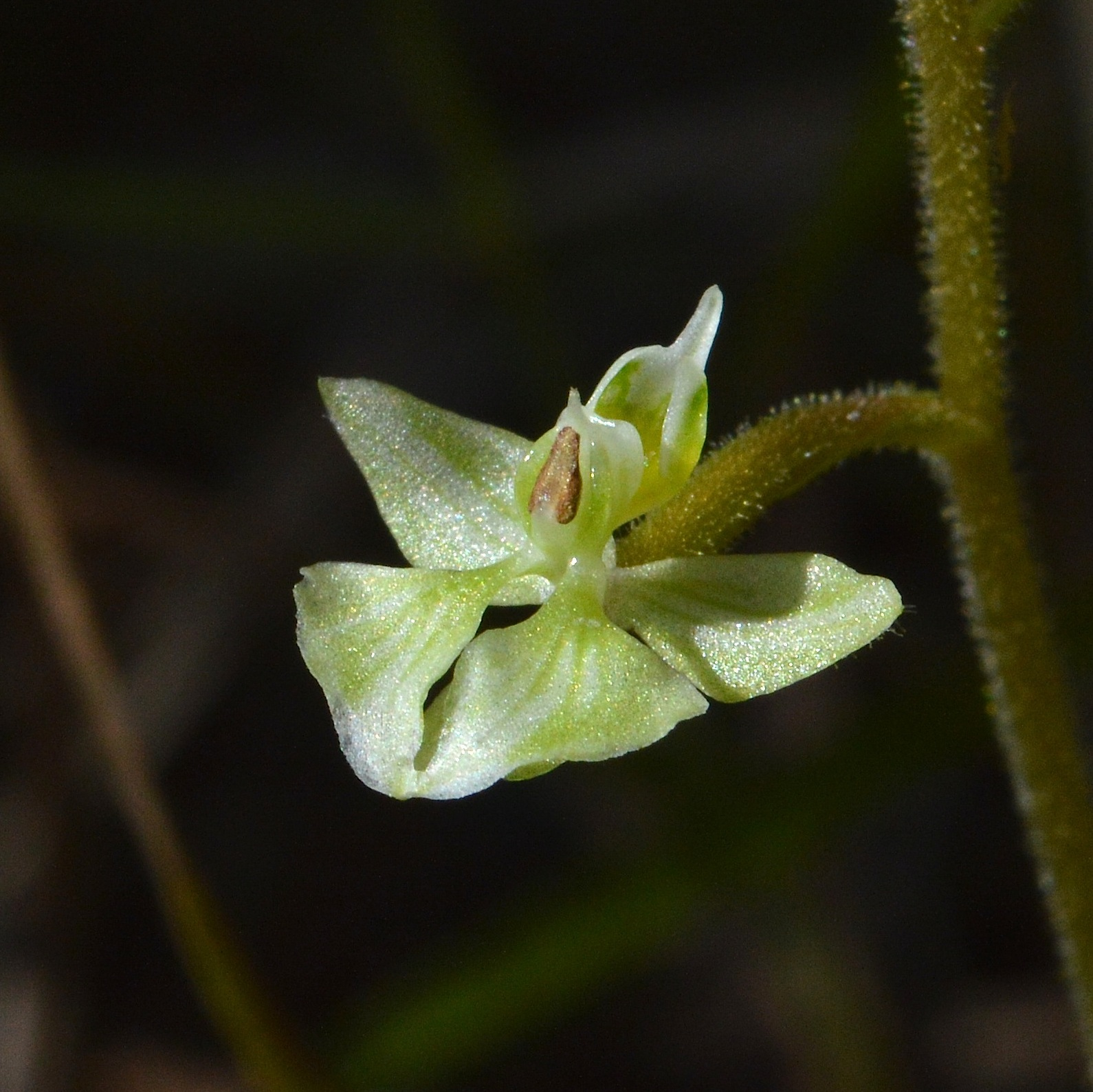

Scientific classification
- Kingdom: Plantae
- Clade: Embryophytes
- Clade: Tracheophytes
- Clade: Spermatophytes
- Clade: Angiosperms
- Clade: Monocots
- Order: Asparagales
- Family: Orchidaceae
- Subfamily: Orchidoideae
- Tribe: Cranichideae
- Genus: Ponthieva
- Species: P. racemosa

Binomial name
- Ponthieva racemosa (Walter) C.Mohr

Synonyms
- Arethusa racemosa Walter (basionym); Neottia glandulosa Sims; Epipactis pubescens Pursh; Ponthieva glandulosa (Sims) R.Br.; Cranichis multiflora Elliott ex Nutt.; Serapias pubescens (Pursh) Steud.; Listera pubescens (Pursh) Elliott; Nerissa glandulosa (Sims) Raf.; Neottia pubera Steud.; Ponthieva oblongifolia A.Rich. & Galeotti; Ponthieva lancifolia A.Rich.; Ponthieva glandulosa var. macra Rchb.f.; Ponthieva guatemalensis Rchb.f.; Ponthieva orchioides Schltr.; Ponthieva costaricensis Schltr.; Ophrys pubera Michx.

= Ponthieva racemosa =

Hairy shadow witch

Species of orchid

Ponthieva racemosa, commonly called the hairy shadow witch or racemose ponthieva, is a species of orchid found from the southeastern United States (from Texas to Virginia), Mexico, Central America, the West Indies and northern South America as far south as Bolivia.
