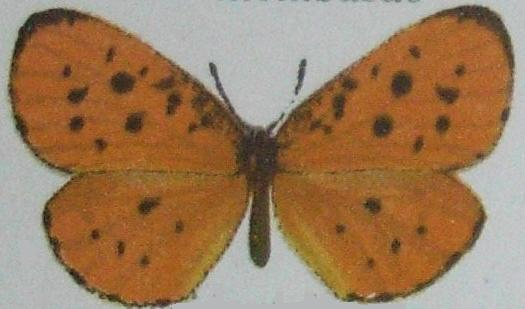

Scientific classification
- Domain: Eukaryota
- Kingdom: Animalia
- Phylum: Arthropoda
- Class: Insecta
- Order: Lepidoptera
- Family: Lycaenidae
- Genus: Pentila
- Species: P. occidentalium

Binomial name
- Pentila occidentalium Aurivillius, 1899

Synonyms
- Pentila occidentalum immaculata Suffert, 1904; Pentila occidentalum ab. congoana Strand, 1918

= Pentila occidentalium =

Species of butterfly

Pentila occidentalium, the unmarked red pentila, is a butterfly in the family Lycaenidae. It is found in Nigeria, Cameroon, Equatorial Guinea and Gabon.

== Subspecies ==
- Pentila occidentalium occidentalium (southern Nigeria, Cameroon)
- Pentila occidentalium gabunica Stempffer & Bennett, 1961 (Equatorial Guinea, Gabon)
