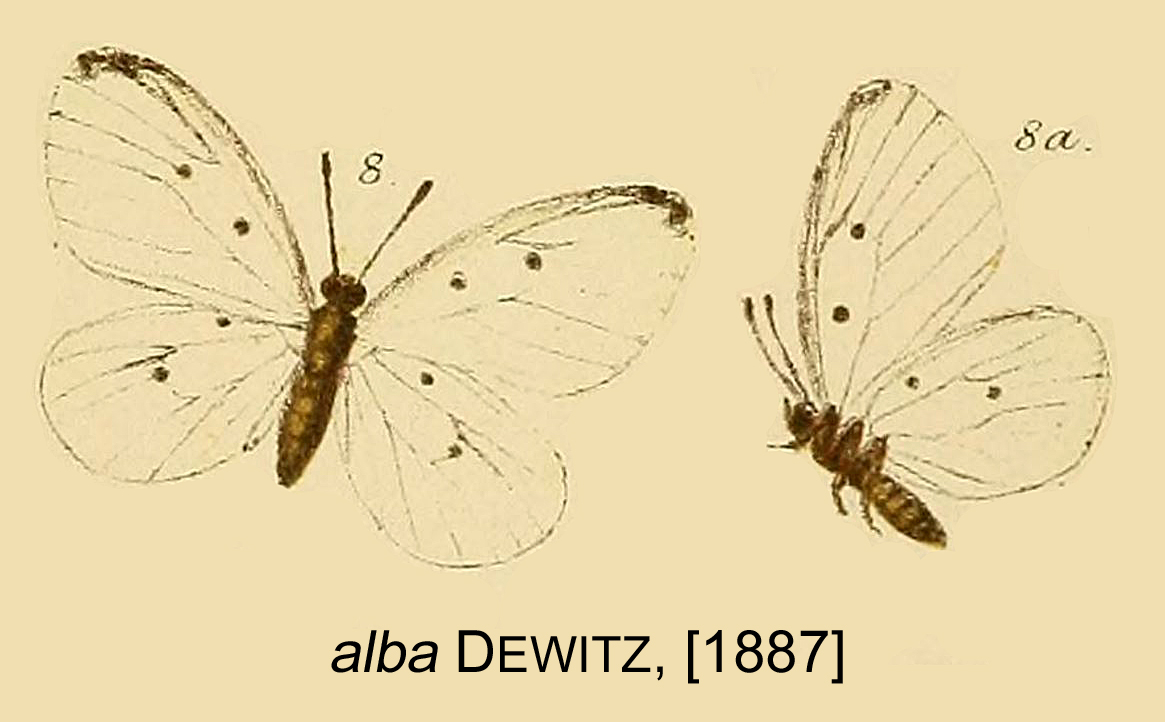

Scientific classification
- Domain: Eukaryota
- Kingdom: Animalia
- Phylum: Arthropoda
- Class: Insecta
- Order: Lepidoptera
- Family: Lycaenidae
- Genus: Pentila
- Species: P. alba

Binomial name
- Pentila alba Dewitz, 1886

= Pentila alba =

Species of butterfly

Pentila alba is a butterfly in the family Lycaenidae. It is found in the Democratic Republic of the Congo (Haut-Uele, North Kivu, Sankuru and Lualaba), Uganda and north-western Tanzania. The habitat consists of forests.

Adults are on wing in December and January.
