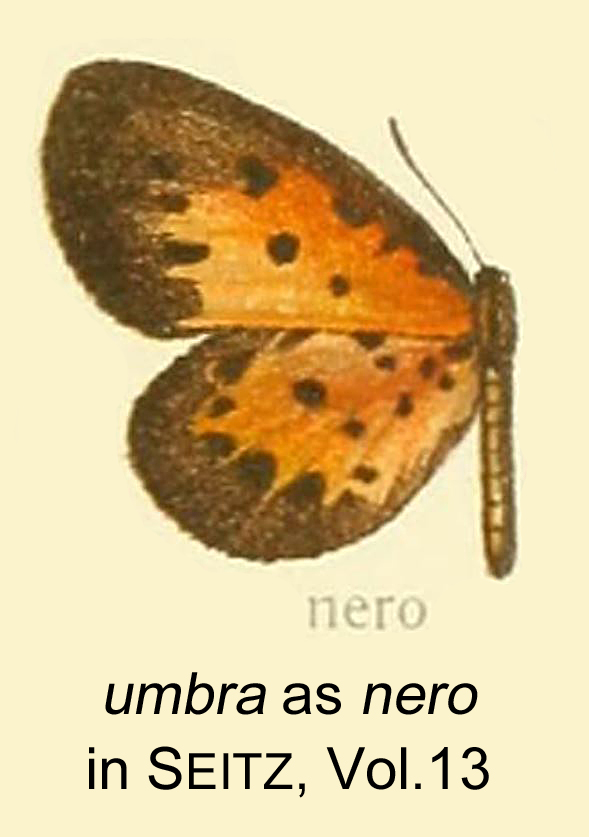

Scientific classification
- Kingdom: Animalia
- Phylum: Arthropoda
- Clade: Pancrustacea
- Class: Insecta
- Order: Lepidoptera
- Family: Lycaenidae
- Genus: Pentila
- Species: P. umbra

Binomial name
- Pentila umbra Holland, 1892

= Pentila umbra =

Species of butterfly

Pentila umbra is a butterfly in the family Lycaenidae. It is found in Gabon.
