= Pentila pseudorotha =

Scientific classification
- Domain: Eukaryota
- Kingdom: Animalia
- Phylum: Arthropoda
- Class: Insecta
- Order: Lepidoptera
- Family: Lycaenidae
- Genus: Pentila
- Species: P. pseudorotha

Binomial name
- Pentila pseudorotha Stempffer & Bennett, 1961

Species of butterfly

Pentila pseudorotha, the large-spotted red pentila, is a butterfly in the family Lycaenidae. It is found in Nigeria and Cameroon.

Adults feed on nectar from tendrils.
