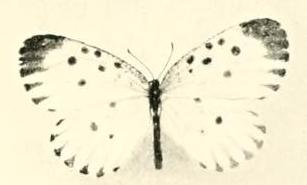

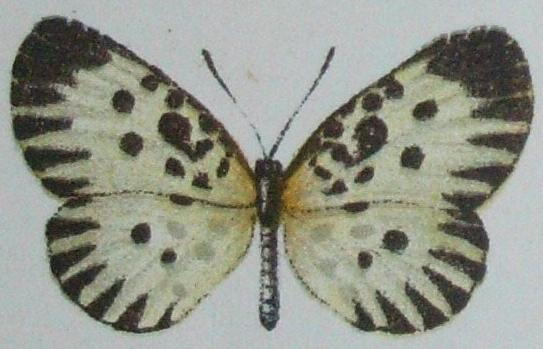

Scientific classification
- Kingdom: Animalia
- Phylum: Arthropoda
- Class: Insecta
- Order: Lepidoptera
- Family: Lycaenidae
- Genus: Pentila
- Species: P. auga

Binomial name
- Pentila auga Karsch, 1895

= Pentila auga =

Species of butterfly

Pentila auga is a butterfly in the family Lycaenidae. It is found in southern Cameroon.
