= Henry de Ponthieu =

Henry de Ponthieu (14 February 1731 – 10 December 1808) was a London merchant of Huguenot ancestry who collected fish and plant specimens from the West Indies for botanist Joseph Banks. The orchid genus Ponthieva was named by botanist Robert Brown in his honour.
