= Pentila swynnertoni =

Scientific classification
- Domain: Eukaryota
- Kingdom: Animalia
- Phylum: Arthropoda
- Class: Insecta
- Order: Lepidoptera
- Family: Lycaenidae
- Genus: Pentila
- Species: P. swynnertoni

Binomial name
- Pentila swynnertoni Stempffer & Bennett, 1961

Synonyms
- Pentila tropicalis swynnertoni Stempffer & Bennett, 1961; Pentila amenaida f. swynnertoni Stevenson, 1940

Species of butterfly

Pentila swynnertoni, the Swynnerton's buff, is a butterfly in the family Lycaenidae. It is found in Mozambique and Zimbabwe. The habitat consists of forests.

Adults have been recorded on wing in February.

The larvae feed on algae (cyanobacteria) growing on trees.
