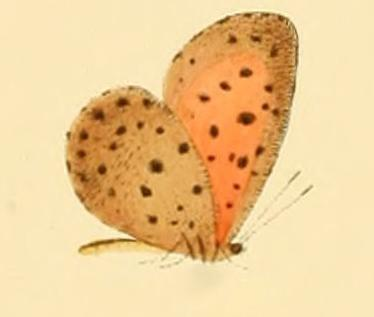

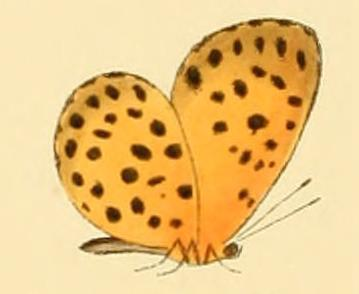

Scientific classification
- Domain: Eukaryota
- Kingdom: Animalia
- Phylum: Arthropoda
- Class: Insecta
- Order: Lepidoptera
- Family: Lycaenidae
- Genus: Pentila
- Species: P. amenaida

Binomial name
- Pentila amenaida Hewitson, 1873

= Pentila amenaida =

Species of butterfly

Pentila amenaida is a butterfly in the family Lycaenidae. It is found in Angola.

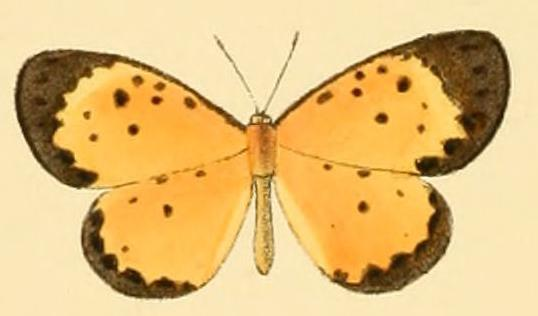
