= Polyortha trochilodes =

Scientific classification
- Kingdom: Animalia
- Phylum: Arthropoda
- Class: Insecta
- Order: Lepidoptera
- Family: Tortricidae
- Genus: Polyortha
- Species: P. trochilodes

Binomial name
- Polyortha trochilodes Meyrick, 1912

Synonyms
- Peronea trochilodes Meyrick, 1912

Species of moth

Polyortha trochilodes is a species of moth of the family Tortricidae. It is found in Colombia.
