= Pentila landbecki =

Scientific classification
- Kingdom: Animalia
- Phylum: Arthropoda
- Class: Insecta
- Order: Lepidoptera
- Family: Lycaenidae
- Genus: Pentila
- Species: P. landbecki

Binomial name
- Pentila landbecki Stempffer & Bennett, 1961

Species of butterfly

Pentila landbecki is a butterfly in the family Lycaenidae. It is found in the Democratic Republic of the Congo (Sankuru and Lulua).
