= Pentila nigeriana =

Scientific classification
- Domain: Eukaryota
- Kingdom: Animalia
- Phylum: Arthropoda
- Class: Insecta
- Order: Lepidoptera
- Family: Lycaenidae
- Genus: Pentila
- Species: P. nigeriana

Binomial name
- Pentila nigeriana Stempffer & Bennett, 1961

Species of butterfly

Pentila nigeriana, the Nigerian red pentila, is a butterfly in the family Lycaenidae. It is found in southern Nigeria. The habitat consists of forests.
