= Polyortha gradatulana =

Scientific classification
- Kingdom: Animalia
- Phylum: Arthropoda
- Clade: Pancrustacea
- Class: Insecta
- Order: Lepidoptera
- Family: Tortricidae
- Genus: Polyortha
- Species: P. gradatulana

Binomial name
- Polyortha gradatulana (Zeller, 1866)

Synonyms
- Teras gradatulana Zeller, 1866; Polyortha gradulatana Walsingham, 1914

Species of moth

Polyortha gradatulana is a species of moth of the family Tortricidae. It is found in Colombia.
