= Pentila fidonioides =

Scientific classification
- Kingdom: Animalia
- Phylum: Arthropoda
- Class: Insecta
- Order: Lepidoptera
- Family: Lycaenidae
- Genus: Pentila
- Species: P. fidonioides

Binomial name
- Pentila fidonioides Schultze, 1923

Species of butterfly

Pentila fidonioides is a butterfly in the family Lycaenidae. It is found in southern Cameroon.
