= Pentila amenaidoides =

Scientific classification
- Domain: Eukaryota
- Kingdom: Animalia
- Phylum: Arthropoda
- Class: Insecta
- Order: Lepidoptera
- Family: Lycaenidae
- Genus: Pentila
- Species: P. amenaidoides

Binomial name
- Pentila amenaidoides (Holland, 1893)

Synonyms
- Tingra amenaidoides Holland, 1893

Species of butterfly

Pentila amenaidoides is a butterfly in the family Lycaenidae. It is found in southern Cameroon, Gabon and the Democratic Republic of the Congo (from the northern part of the country to Isiro).
