= Paragorgopis cancellata =

Scientific classification
- Domain: Eukaryota
- Kingdom: Animalia
- Phylum: Arthropoda
- Class: Insecta
- Order: Diptera
- Family: Ulidiidae
- Genus: Paragorgopis
- Species: P. cancellata

Binomial name
- Paragorgopis cancellata Hendel, 1909

Species of fly

Paragorgopis cancellata is a species of ulidiid or picture-winged fly in the genus Paragorgopis of the family Ulidiidae.
