= Pentila umangiana =

Scientific classification
- Domain: Eukaryota
- Kingdom: Animalia
- Phylum: Arthropoda
- Class: Insecta
- Order: Lepidoptera
- Family: Lycaenidae
- Genus: Pentila
- Species: P. umangiana

Binomial name
- Pentila umangiana Aurivillius, 1898

Synonyms
- Pentila petreia connectens Hulstaert, 1924; Pentila prodita Schultze, 1923

Species of butterfly

Pentila umangiana is a butterfly in the family Lycaenidae. It is found in Nigeria, Cameroon, the Republic of the Congo, from the Democratic Republic of the Congo to Sudan and in Uganda, Tanzania and Zambia. The habitat consists of forests.

== Subspecies ==
- P. u. umangiana (Democratic Republic of the Congo: Mayumbe, Mongala, Bas-Uele, Tshopo, Ituri, Tshuapa, Equateur and Sankuru)
- P. u. connectens Hulstaert, 1924 (southern Sudan, Uganda, Democratic Republic of the Congo: south-eastern Ituri, Tanzania: north-west to the Bukoba Region)
- P. u. fontainei Stempffer & Bennett, 1961 (Democratic Republic of the Congo: Haut-Uele)
- P. u. meridionalis Berger, 1981 (Democratic Republic of the Congo: Shaba and Lualaba, Zambia: Mwinilunga District)
- P. u. mpanda Congdon, Kielland & Collins, 1998 (Tanzania: Mpanda district)
- P. u. prodita Schultze, 1923 (Nigeria, Cameroon and Congo)
