= Pentila inconspicua =

Scientific classification
- Domain: Eukaryota
- Kingdom: Animalia
- Phylum: Arthropoda
- Class: Insecta
- Order: Lepidoptera
- Family: Lycaenidae
- Genus: Pentila
- Species: P. inconspicua

Binomial name
- Pentila inconspicua H. H. Druce, 1910

Species of butterfly

Pentila inconspicua, the inconspicuous pentila, is a butterfly in the family Lycaenidae. The species was first described by Hamilton Herbert Druce in 1910. It is found in southern Cameroon, the Republic of the Congo, the Democratic Republic of the Congo (Mongala, Haut-Uele, Ituri, North Kivu, Tshopo, Equateur, Kinshasa, Sankuru and Lualaba), Uganda, western Kenya and Tanzania (west to Kigoma and bordering areas of Mpanda). The habitat consists of primary forests.
