= Pterocalla bella =

Scientific classification
- Domain: Eukaryota
- Kingdom: Animalia
- Phylum: Arthropoda
- Class: Insecta
- Order: Diptera
- Family: Ulidiidae
- Genus: Pterocalla
- Species: P. bella

Binomial name
- Pterocalla bella Giglio-Tos, 1895

Species of fly

Pterocalla bella is a species of ulidiid or picture-winged fly in the genus Pterocalla of the family Ulidiidae.
