= Polyortha atroperla =

Scientific classification
- Domain: Eukaryota
- Kingdom: Animalia
- Phylum: Arthropoda
- Class: Insecta
- Order: Lepidoptera
- Family: Tortricidae
- Genus: Polyortha
- Species: P. atroperla

Binomial name
- Polyortha atroperla Razowski, 1980

Species of moth

Polyortha atroperla is a species of moth of the family Tortricidae. It is found in Costa Rica.
