= Polyortha chiriquitana =

Scientific classification
- Kingdom: Animalia
- Phylum: Arthropoda
- Clade: Pancrustacea
- Class: Insecta
- Order: Lepidoptera
- Family: Tortricidae
- Genus: Polyortha
- Species: P. chiriquitana

Binomial name
- Polyortha chiriquitana (Zeller, 1877)

Synonyms
- Teras chiriquitana Zeller, 1877

Species of moth

Polyortha chiriquitana is a species of moth of the family Tortricidae. It is found in Panama.
