= Pentila carcassoni =

Scientific classification
- Kingdom: Animalia
- Phylum: Arthropoda
- Class: Insecta
- Order: Lepidoptera
- Family: Lycaenidae
- Genus: Pentila
- Species: P. carcassoni

Binomial name
- Pentila carcassoni Stempffer & Bennett, 1961

Species of butterfly

Pentila carcassoni is a butterfly in the family Lycaenidae. It is found in northern Malawi.
