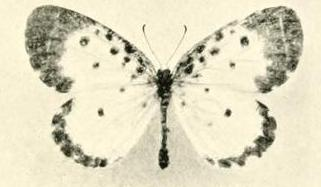

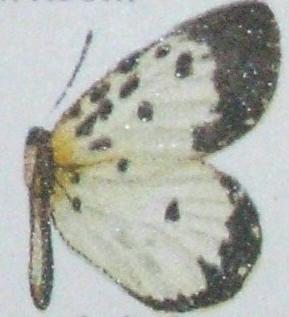

Scientific classification
- Domain: Eukaryota
- Kingdom: Animalia
- Phylum: Arthropoda
- Class: Insecta
- Order: Lepidoptera
- Family: Lycaenidae
- Genus: Pentila
- Species: P. christina

Binomial name
- Pentila christina Suffert, 1904

= Pentila christina =

Species of butterfly

Pentila christina is a butterfly in the family Lycaenidae. It is found in Cameroon, the Republic of the Congo and the Democratic Republic of the Congo (Ituri and North Kivu).
