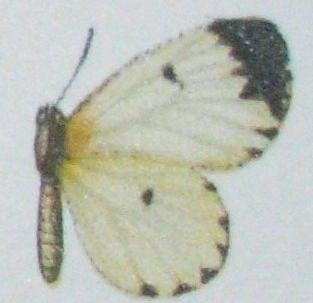

Scientific classification
- Domain: Eukaryota
- Kingdom: Animalia
- Phylum: Arthropoda
- Class: Insecta
- Order: Lepidoptera
- Family: Lycaenidae
- Genus: Pentila
- Species: P. torrida

Binomial name
- Pentila torrida (Kirby, 1887)

Synonyms
- Tingra torrida Kirby, 1887; Tingra lavinia Kirby, 1890

= Pentila torrida =

Species of butterfly

Pentila torrida is a butterfly in the family Lycaenidae. It is found in Gabon, the Republic of the Congo and Bas-Fleuve in the Democratic Republic of the Congo .
