= Pterocalla punctata =

Scientific classification
- Kingdom: Animalia
- Phylum: Arthropoda
- Clade: Pancrustacea
- Class: Insecta
- Order: Diptera
- Family: Ulidiidae
- Genus: Pterocalla
- Species: P. punctata

Binomial name
- Pterocalla punctata Hendel, 1909

Species of fly

Pterocalla punctata is a species of ulidiid or picture-winged fly in the genus Pterocalla of the family Ulidiidae.
