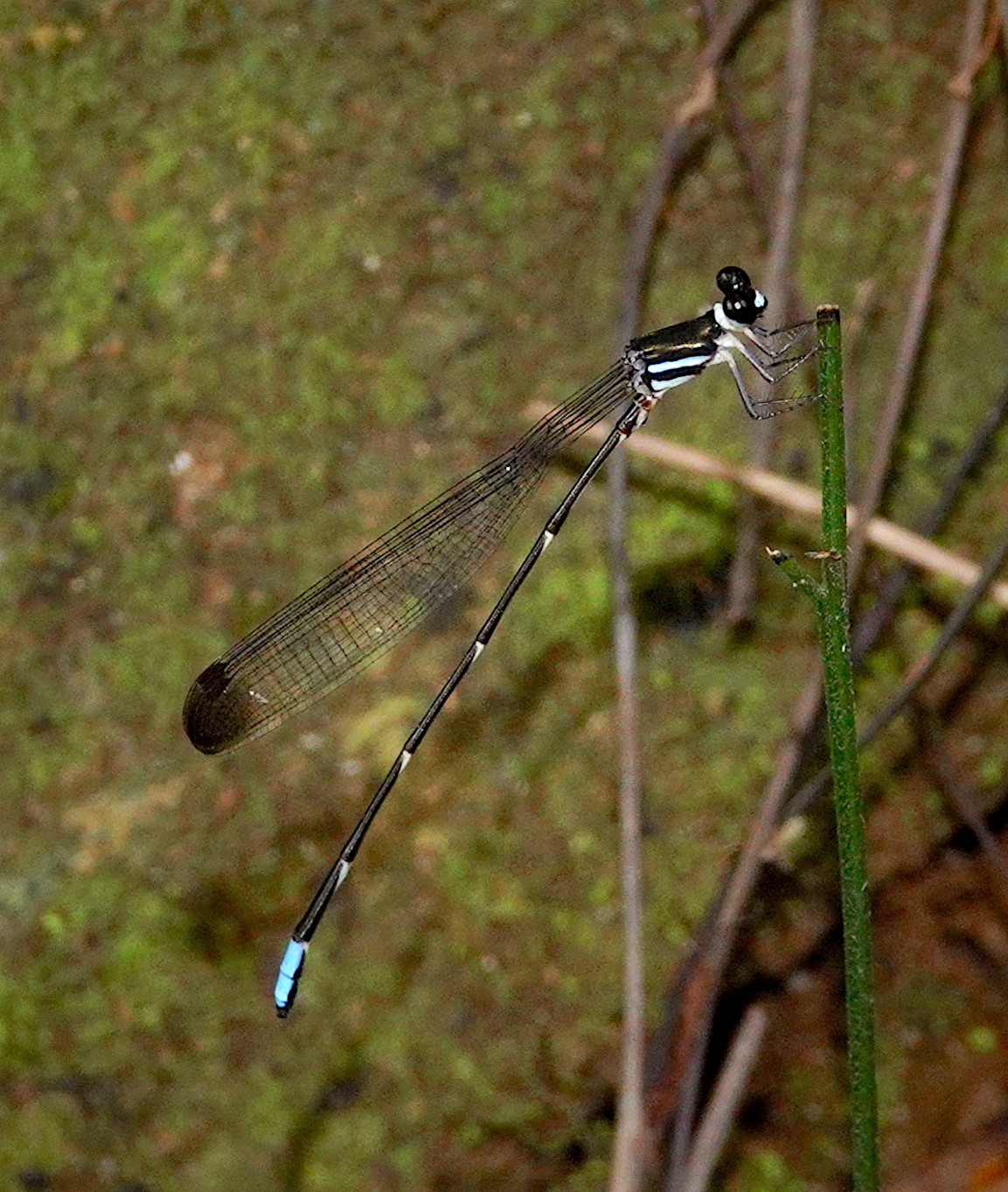

Scientific classification
- Kingdom: Animalia
- Phylum: Arthropoda
- Class: Insecta
- Order: Odonata
- Suborder: Zygoptera
- Family: Platystictidae
- Genus: Platysticta
- Species: P. apicalis

Binomial name
- Platysticta apicalis Kirby, 1894

= Platysticta apicalis =

Species of damselfly

Platysticta apicalis, the dark forestwraith, is a species of damselfly in family Platystictidae. It is endemic to Sri Lanka.
