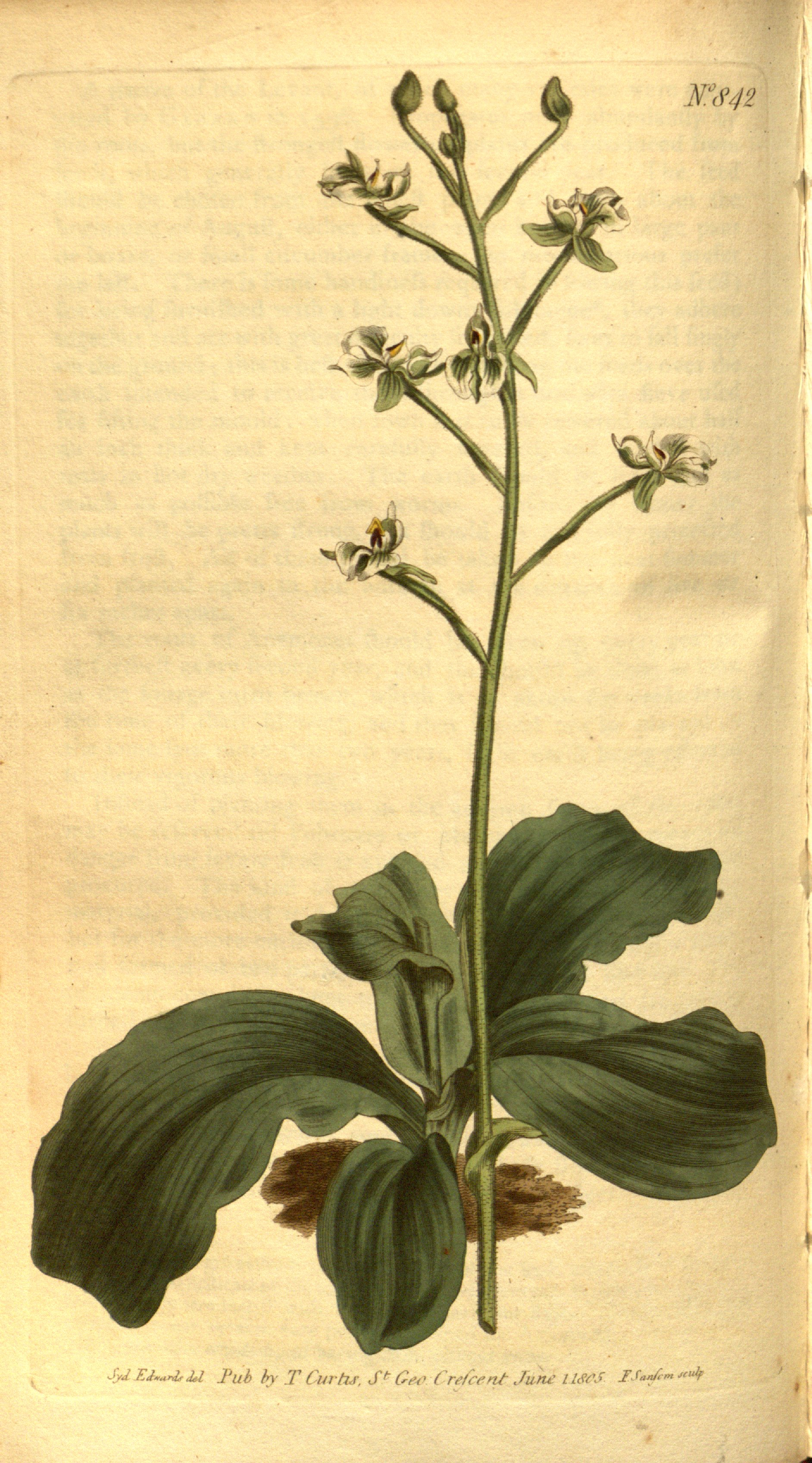
- Hairy shadow witch (Ponthieva racemosa); 1805 illustration

Scientific classification
- Kingdom: Plantae
- Clade: Embryophytes
- Clade: Tracheophytes
- Clade: Spermatophytes
- Clade: Angiosperms
- Clade: Monocots
- Order: Asparagales
- Family: Orchidaceae
- Subfamily: Orchidoideae
- Tribe: Cranichideae
- Subtribe: Cranichidinae
- Genus: Ponthieva; R.Br. in W.T.Aiton (1813)

Type species
- Neottia glandulosa (now synonym of Ponthieva racemosa (Walter) C.Mohr ) Sims, Bot. Mag. 22: t. 842 (1805).

Synonyms
- Nerissa Raf.; Androchilus Liebm. ex Hartm.; Ocampoa A.Rich. & Galeotti; Schoenleinia Klotzsch ex Lindl.; Calorchis Barb.Rodr.; Exalaria Garay & G.A.Romero

= Ponthieva =

Shadow witch

Genus of orchids

Ponthieva is a genus in the orchid family (Orchidaceae), commonly known as the shadow witch. They are named after Henry de Ponthieu, an English merchant of Huguenot ancestry who sent West Indian plant collections to Sir Joseph Banks in 1778.

Ponthieva is widely distributed in the southeastern United States, the West Indies, and Latin America from Mexico to Argentina.

They are mainly terrestrial plants with sympodial growth, but some are epiphytes. Their fibrous root show long and soft hairs. Some of the branches are thickened. The simple stem grows from rhizomes and carries thin, basal leaves with a slight to a somewhat longer stalk. The few to many, erect flowers grow on bracteate peduncles in a terminal raceme. Their dorsal sepal is slightly joined to the petals at the apex. The petals are free or sometimes fused to lower flanks of the column. The lateral sepals are distinct or joined.

The clawed lip is fused to the base of the short column. This is semiterete, i.e. in the form of a cylinder, rounded on one side and flat on the other. It is slightly winged towards the pointed apex.

There are four, yellow, club-shaped pollinia that are joined in pairs.

== Species ==
Species accepted as of June 2014:

1. Ponthieva andicola Rchb.f. (1876) (Ecuador)
2. Ponthieva appendiculata Schltr. (1915) (Ecuador)
3. Ponthieva bicornuta C.Schweinf. (1951) (Peru)
4. Ponthieva brenesii Schltr. (1923) (Costa Rica, Panama)
5. Ponthieva brittoniae Ames (1910) : Britton's Shadow Witch (Florida, Bahamas, Cuba)
6. Ponthieva campestris (Liebm.) Garay (1995) (Mexico)
7. Ponthieva collantesii D.E.Benn. & Christenson (1998) (Peru)
8. Ponthieva cornuta Rchb.f. (1876) (Bolivia)
9. Ponthieva curvilabia Garay (1978) (Ecuador)
10. Ponthieva cuyujana Dodson & Hirtz (1989) (Ecuador)
11. Ponthieva diptera Linden & Rchb.f. (1854) : Two-winged Ponthieva (Cuba, Haiti, Jamaica, Guyana, Venezuela, Colombia, Ecuador, Peru)
12. Ponthieva disema Schltr. (1915) (Ecuador)
13. Ponthieva dunstervillei Foldats (1968) (Venezuela)
14. Ponthieva elegans (Kraenzl.) Schltr. (1912) (Bolivia)
15. Ponthieva ephippium Rchb.f. (1857) (Mexico, Guatemala)
16. Ponthieva fertilis (F.Lehm. & Kraenzl.) Salazar (2009) (Venezuela, Bolivia, Colombia, Ecuador, Peru)
17. Ponthieva formosa Schltr. (1923) (Mexico, Central America)
18. Ponthieva garayana Dodson & R.Vásquez (1989) (Bolivia)
19. Ponthieva gimana Dodson (2003) (Ecuador)
20. Ponthieva gracilis Renz (1948) (Colombia)
21. Ponthieva hameri Dressler (1998) (El Salvador)
22. Ponthieva hassleri Schltr. (1920) (Paraguay)
23. Ponthieva hildae R.González & Soltero (1991) (Mexico)
24. Ponthieva inaudita Rchb.f. (1876) : Unheard Ponthieva (Colombia, Ecuador, Peru)
25. Ponthieva insularis Dressler (2005) (Galapagos Islands)
26. Ponthieva keraia Garay & Dunst. (1976) (Venezuela, Ecuador)
27. Ponthieva lilacina C.Schweinf. (1941) (Peru)
28. Ponthieva maculata Lindl. (1845) : Spotted Ponthieva (Venezuela, Ecuador)
29. Ponthieva mandonii Rchb.f. (1878) (Peru to NW Argentina)
30. Ponthieva mexicana (A.Rich. & Galeotti) Salazar (2009) (Mexico, Guatemala)
31. Ponthieva microglossa Schltr. (1920) (Colombia)
32. Ponthieva nigricans Schltr. (1917) (Ecuador)
33. Ponthieva oligoneura Schltr. (1921) (Peru)
34. Ponthieva ovatilabia C.Schweinf. (1961) (Venezuela, Guyana)
35. Ponthieva parvilabris (Lindl.) Rchb.f. (1878) : Small-lipped Ponthieva (Venezuela, Ecuador)
36. Ponthieva parvula Schltr. (1912) (Mexico, Guatemala)
37. Ponthieva pauciflora (Sw.) Fawc. & Rendle (1910) (Caribbean)
38. Ponthieva petiolata Lindl., Bot. Reg. 9: t. 760 (1824) (Lesser Antiles)
39. Ponthieva phaenoleuca (Barb.Rodr.) Cogn. in C.F.P.von Martius & auct. suc. (eds.) (1895) (Brazil)
40. Ponthieva pilosissima (Senghas) Dodson (1996) : Hairy Ponthieva (Ecuador)
41. Ponthieva pseudoracemosa Garay (1978) (Ecuador, Peru)
42. Ponthieva pubescens (C.Presl) C.Schweinf. (1970) (Ecuador, Peru, Brazil)
43. Ponthieva pulchella Schltr. (1918) (Mexico, Guatemala)
44. Ponthieva racemosa (Walter) C.Mohr : Hairy Shadow Witch, Racemose Ponthieva (SE USA, Mexico, tropical America)
45. Ponthieva rinconii Salazar (2005) (Mexico)
46. Ponthieva rostrata Lindl. (1845) (Ecuador, Peru)
47. Ponthieva schaffneri (Rchb.f.) E.W.Greenw. (1990) (Mexico, Guatemala)
48. Ponthieva similis C.Schweinf. (1941) (Colombia, Ecuador, Peru)
49. Ponthieva sprucei Cogn. in C.F.P.von Martius & auct. suc. (eds.) (1895) (Peru)
50. Ponthieva sylvicola Rchb.f. (1876) (Ecuador)
51. Ponthieva triloba Schltr. (1910) : Three-lobed Lip Ponthieva (Mexico, El Salvador)
52. Ponthieva trilobata (L.O.Williams) L.O.Williams (1972) (Mexico, Guatemala)
53. Ponthieva tuerckheimii Schltr. (1906) (Mexico, Guatemala, Costa Rica, Panama)
54. Ponthieva tunguraguae Garay (1978) (Ecuador)
55. Ponthieva unguiculata Ames & C.Schweinf. (1925) (Bolivia)
56. Ponthieva vasquezii Dodson (1989) (Bolivia)
57. Ponthieva ventricosa (Griseb.) Fawc. & Rendle (1910) : Smooth Shadow Witch (Caribbean)
58. Ponthieva venusta Schltr. (1921) (Ecuador, Peru)
59. Ponthieva villosa Lindl. in G.Bentham (1845) (Ecuador, Peru)
60. Ponthieva viridilimbata Dressler (2005) (Ecuador)
61. Ponthieva weberbaueri Schltr. (1921) (Peru)
