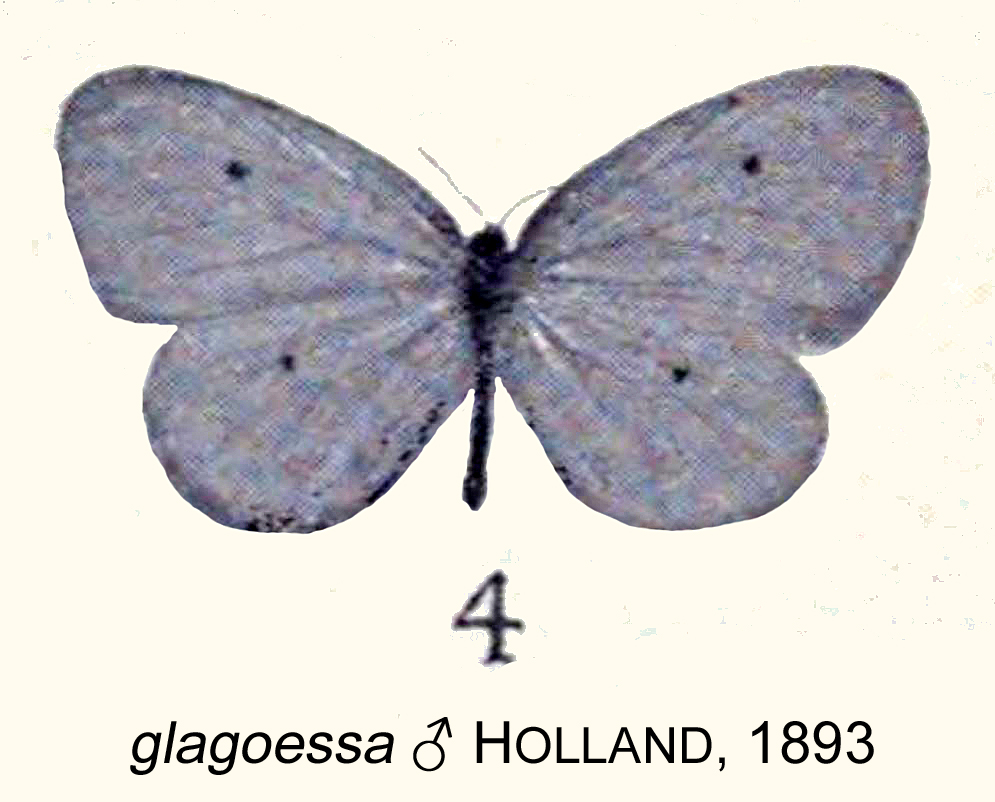

Scientific classification
- Domain: Eukaryota
- Kingdom: Animalia
- Phylum: Arthropoda
- Class: Insecta
- Order: Lepidoptera
- Family: Lycaenidae
- Genus: Pentila
- Species: P. glagoessa

Binomial name
- Pentila glagoessa (Holland, 1893)

Synonyms
- Tingra glagoessa Holland, 1893

= Pentila glagoessa =

Species of butterfly

Pentila glagoessa, the immaculate cream pentila, is a butterfly in the family Lycaenidae. It is found in eastern and southern Nigeria, Cameroon, Gabon, the Democratic Republic of the Congo (Haut-Uele, Tshopo, Equateur and Sankuru) and Uganda. The habitat consists of forests.

Adults resemble day-flying cream moths.
