= Pentila mesia =

Scientific classification
- Kingdom: Animalia
- Phylum: Arthropoda
- Class: Insecta
- Order: Lepidoptera
- Family: Lycaenidae
- Genus: Pentila
- Species: P. mesia

Binomial name
- Pentila mesia Hulstaert, 1924

Species of butterfly

Pentila mesia is a butterfly in the family Lycaenidae. It is found in Cameroon.
