= Polyortha magnifica =

Scientific classification
- Domain: Eukaryota
- Kingdom: Animalia
- Phylum: Arthropoda
- Class: Insecta
- Order: Lepidoptera
- Family: Tortricidae
- Genus: Polyortha
- Species: P. magnifica

Binomial name
- Polyortha magnifica Walsingham, 1914

Species of moth

Polyortha magnifica is a species of moth of the family Tortricidae. It is found in Panama.
