= Polyortha bryometalla =

Scientific classification
- Kingdom: Animalia
- Phylum: Arthropoda
- Class: Insecta
- Order: Lepidoptera
- Family: Tortricidae
- Genus: Polyortha
- Species: P. bryometalla

Binomial name
- Polyortha bryometalla Meyrick, 1932

Species of moth

Polyortha bryometalla is a species of moth of the family Tortricidae. It is found in Costa Rica.
