= Paragorgopis =

Scientific classification
- Kingdom: Animalia
- Phylum: Arthropoda
- Clade: Pancrustacea
- Class: Insecta
- Order: Diptera
- Family: Ulidiidae
- Subfamily: Ulidiinae
- Tribe: Pterocallini
- Genus: Paragorgopis; Giglio-Tos, 1893

Species
- P. argyrata; P. cancellata; P. clathrata; P. discrepans; P. euryale; P. maculata; P. oreas; P. schnusei; Paragorgopis spitzi Viette 1956 (from Brazil); P. stapes; P. stheno

Synonyms
- Paragorgopsis Giglio-Tos, 1893

Genus of flies

Paragorgopis is a genus of picture-winged flies in the family Ulidiidae.

== Species ==
- Paragorgopis argyrata
- Paragorgopis cancellata
- Paragorgopis clathrata
- Paragorgopis discrepans
- Paragorgopis euryale
- Paragorgopis maculata
- Paragorgopis oreas
- Paragorgopis schnusei
- Paragorgopis stapes
- Paragorgopis stheno
