= Pentila fallax =

Scientific classification
- Domain: Eukaryota
- Kingdom: Animalia
- Phylum: Arthropoda
- Class: Insecta
- Order: Lepidoptera
- Family: Lycaenidae
- Genus: Pentila
- Species: P. fallax

Binomial name
- Pentila fallax Bethune-Baker, 1915

Species of butterfly

Pentila fallax is a butterfly in the family Lycaenidae. It is found in Cameroon and the Republic of the Congo.
