= Polyortha larocae =

Scientific classification
- Kingdom: Animalia
- Phylum: Arthropoda
- Clade: Pancrustacea
- Class: Insecta
- Order: Lepidoptera
- Family: Tortricidae
- Genus: Polyortha
- Species: P. larocae

Binomial name
- Polyortha larocae Razowski & Becker, 1981

Species of moth

Polyortha larocae is a species of moth of the family Tortricidae. It is found in Brazil.
