= Pentila camerunica =

Scientific classification
- Domain: Eukaryota
- Kingdom: Animalia
- Phylum: Arthropoda
- Class: Insecta
- Order: Lepidoptera
- Family: Lycaenidae
- Genus: Pentila
- Species: P. camerunica

Binomial name
- Pentila camerunica Stempffer & Bennett, 1961

Species of butterfly

Pentila camerunica, the Cameroon cream pentila, is a butterfly in the family Lycaenidae. It is found in southern Nigeria and southern Cameroon. The habitat consists of forests.
