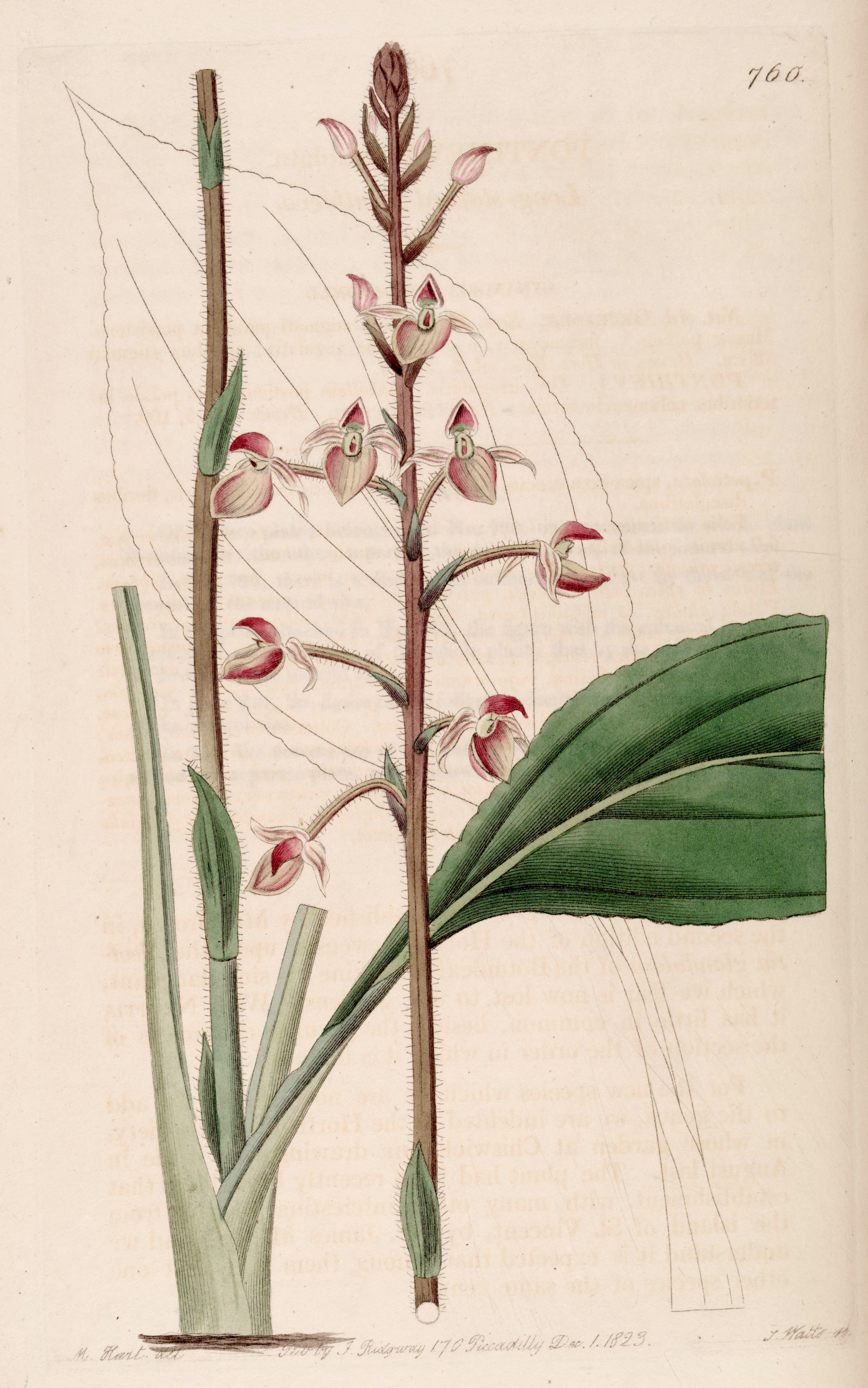
- Ponthieva petiolata 1823 illustration

Scientific classification
- Kingdom: Plantae
- Clade: Embryophytes
- Clade: Tracheophytes
- Clade: Spermatophytes
- Clade: Angiosperms
- Clade: Monocots
- Order: Asparagales
- Family: Orchidaceae
- Subfamily: Orchidoideae
- Tribe: Cranichideae
- Genus: Ponthieva
- Species: P. petiolata

Binomial name
- Ponthieva petiolata Lindl.

= Ponthieva petiolata =

Species of orchid

Ponthieva petiolata is a species of orchid native to Cuba and the Lesser Antilles.
