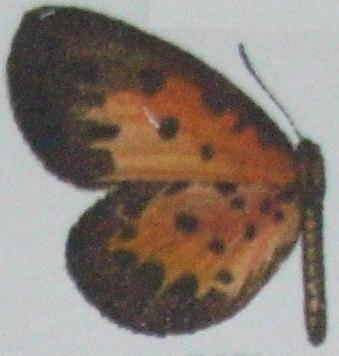

Scientific classification
- Domain: Eukaryota
- Kingdom: Animalia
- Phylum: Arthropoda
- Class: Insecta
- Order: Lepidoptera
- Family: Lycaenidae
- Genus: Pentila
- Species: P. nero

Binomial name
- Pentila nero (Grose-Smith & Kirby, 1894)

Synonyms
- Tingra nero Grose-Smith & Kirby, 1894; Tingra bertha Grose-Smith and Kirby, 1894

= Pentila nero =

Species of butterfly

Pentila nero is a butterfly in the family Lycaenidae. It is found in the Republic of the Congo and possibly Cameroon. The habitat consists of forests.
