= Paragorgopis oreas =

Scientific classification
- Domain: Eukaryota
- Kingdom: Animalia
- Phylum: Arthropoda
- Class: Insecta
- Order: Diptera
- Family: Ulidiidae
- Genus: Paragorgopis
- Species: P. oreas

Binomial name
- Paragorgopis oreas Schaus, 1892

Species of fly

Paragorgopis oreas is a species of ulidiid or picture-winged fly in the genus Paragorgopis of the family Tephritidae.
