= Polyortha thammiana =

Scientific classification
- Kingdom: Animalia
- Phylum: Arthropoda
- Clade: Pancrustacea
- Class: Insecta
- Order: Lepidoptera
- Family: Tortricidae
- Genus: Polyortha
- Species: P. thammiana

Binomial name
- Polyortha thammiana (Zeller, 1877)

Synonyms
- Teras thammiana Zeller, 1877

Species of moth

Polyortha thammiana is a species of moth of the family Tortricidae. It is found in Peru.
