= Platystictinae =

Scientific classification
- Kingdom: Animalia
- Phylum: Arthropoda
- Clade: Pancrustacea
- Class: Insecta
- Order: Odonata
- Suborder: Zygoptera
- Family: Platystictidae
- Subfamily: Platystictinae; Kennedy, 1920

Genera
- Ceylonosticta; Platysticta

Subfamily of damselflies

Platystictinae is a subfamily of damselflies in the family Platystictidae. Kennedy established it in 1920.
