= Platysticta maculata =

Scientific classification
- Kingdom: Animalia
- Phylum: Arthropoda
- Clade: Pancrustacea
- Class: Insecta
- Order: Odonata
- Suborder: Zygoptera
- Family: Platystictidae
- Genus: Platysticta
- Species: P. maculata

Binomial name
- Platysticta maculata Hagen in Selys, 1860

Species of damselfly

Platysticta maculata, the blurry forestdamsel, is a species of damselfly in family Platystictidae. It is endemic to Sri Lanka. There are 2 subspecies recognized.

== Subspecies ==
- Platysticta maculata deccanensis
- Platysticta maculata maculata
