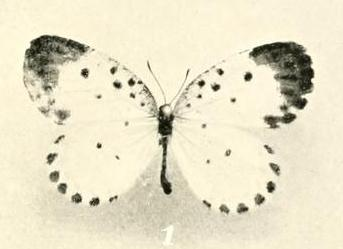

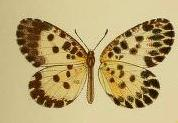

Scientific classification
- Domain: Eukaryota
- Kingdom: Animalia
- Phylum: Arthropoda
- Class: Insecta
- Order: Lepidoptera
- Family: Lycaenidae
- Genus: Pentila
- Species: P. maculata

Binomial name
- Pentila maculata (Kirby, 1887)

Synonyms
- Tingra maculata Kirby, 1887; Pentila abraxas maculata; Pentila yaunda Karsch, 1895; Pentila hedwiga Suffert, 1904; Pentila telesippe Grünberg, 1910; Pentila elpinice Grünberg, 1910; Pentila pardalena Druce, 1910; Pentila abraxas pardalena; Pentila abraxas ab. affixa Schultze, 1923; Pentila subochracea Hawker-Smith, 1933; Pentila abraxas subochracea

= Pentila maculata =

Species of butterfly

Pentila maculata, the multi-spot pentila, is a butterfly in the family Lycaenidae. It is found in Nigeria, Cameroon, Equatorial Guinea, Gabon and the Democratic Republic of the Congo. The habitat consists of forests.

== Subspecies ==
- Pentila maculata maculata (Nigeria: from Lagos to the Cross River loop, western Cameroon)
- Pentila maculata pardalena Druce, 1910 (Cameroon, Equatorial Guinea: Bioko and Mbini, Gabon, Democratic Republic of the Congo: Mayumbe, Haut-Uele and Tshopo)
- Pentila maculata subochracea Hawker-Smith, 1933 (Democratic Republic of the Congo: Sankuru, Tshopo, Bas-Uele and West Kivu)
