= Polyortha maculata =

Scientific classification
- Domain: Eukaryota
- Kingdom: Animalia
- Phylum: Arthropoda
- Class: Insecta
- Order: Lepidoptera
- Family: Tortricidae
- Genus: Polyortha
- Species: P. maculata

Binomial name
- Polyortha maculata Razowski, 1999

Species of moth

Polyortha maculata is a species of moth of the family Tortricidae. It is found in Ecuador.
