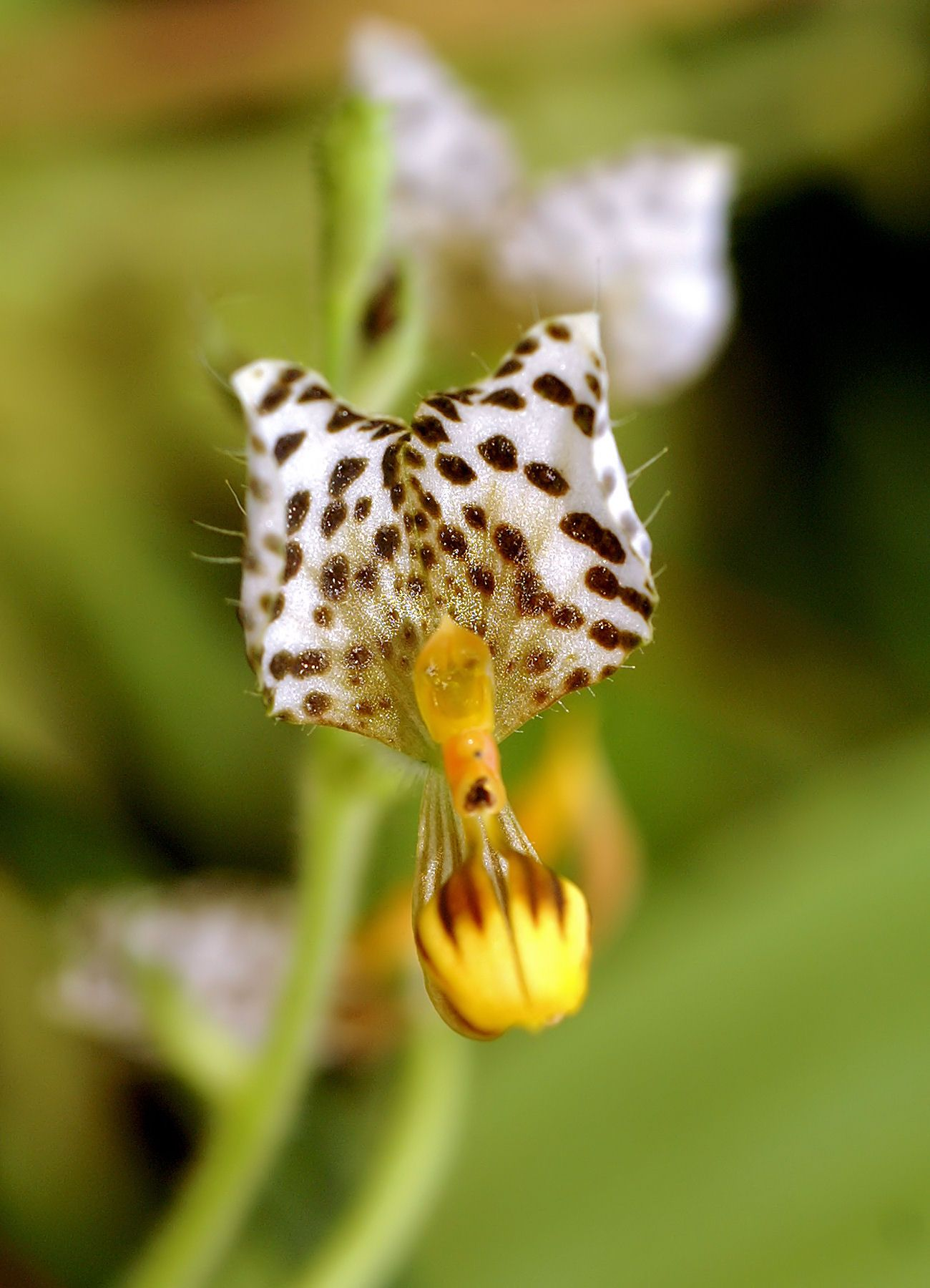
- Flower of Ponthieva maculata

Scientific classification
- Kingdom: Plantae
- Clade: Embryophytes
- Clade: Tracheophytes
- Clade: Spermatophytes
- Clade: Angiosperms
- Clade: Monocots
- Order: Asparagales
- Family: Orchidaceae
- Subfamily: Orchidoideae
- Tribe: Cranichideae
- Genus: Ponthieva
- Species: P. maculata

Binomial name
- Ponthieva maculata Lindl.

Synonyms
- Ponthieva wallisi Rchb.f.

= Ponthieva maculata =

Spotted ponthieva

Species of orchid

Ponthieva maculata, the spotted ponthieva, is a species of orchid found from Venezuela, Colombia, Costa Rica and Ecuador.
