= Pterocalla maculata =

Scientific classification
- Domain: Eukaryota
- Kingdom: Animalia
- Phylum: Arthropoda
- Class: Insecta
- Order: Diptera
- Family: Ulidiidae
- Genus: Pterocalla
- Species: P. maculata

Binomial name
- Pterocalla maculata Hernandez and Arias, 1989

Species of fly

Pterocalla maculata is a species of ulidiid or picture-winged fly in the genus Pterocalla of the family Ulidiidae.
