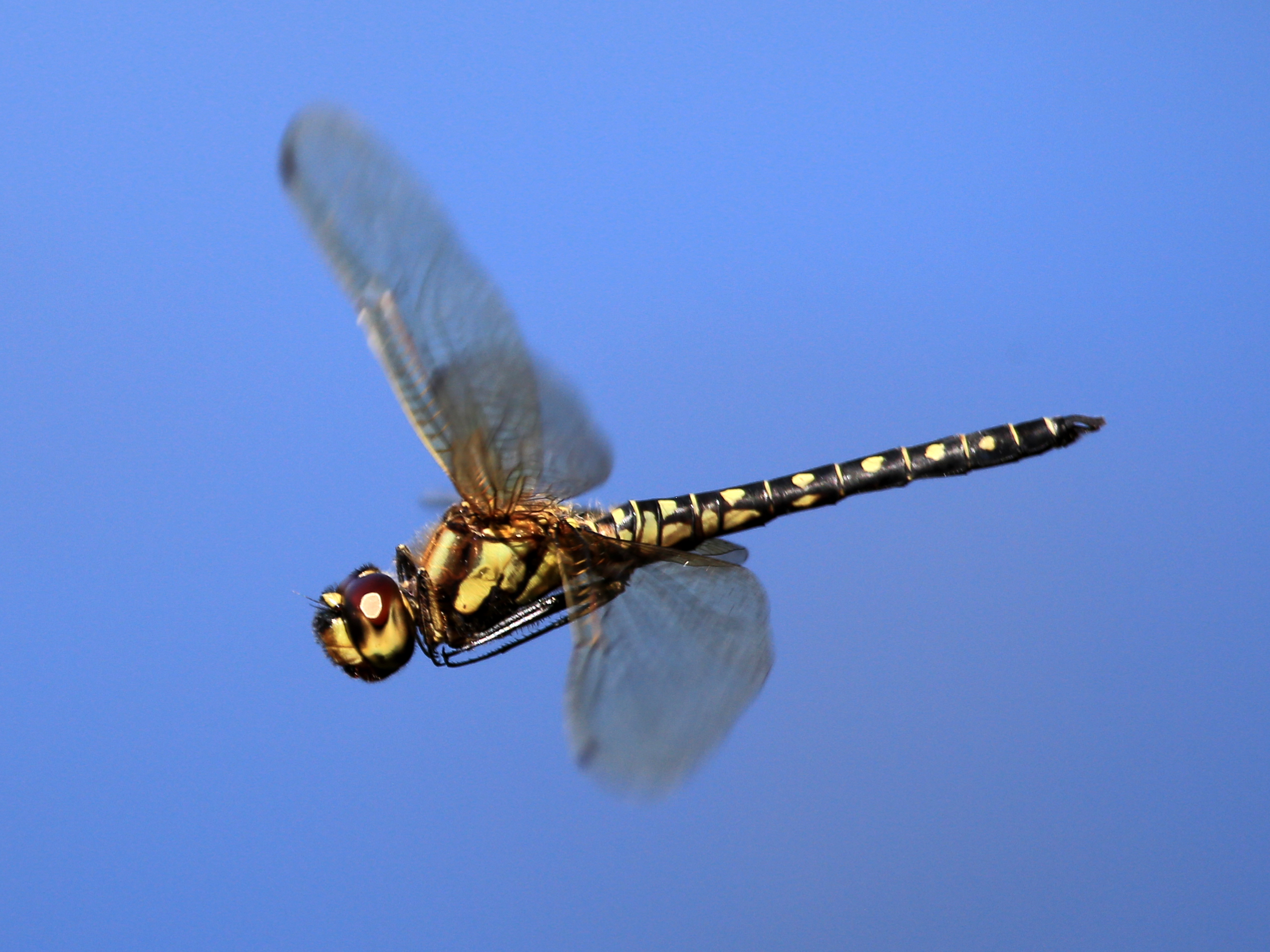
- Hydrobasileus brevistylus

Scientific classification
- Kingdom: Animalia
- Phylum: Arthropoda
- Clade: Pancrustacea
- Class: Insecta
- Order: Odonata
- Suborder: Anisoptera
- Superfamily: Libelluloidea
- Family: Libellulidae
- Subfamily: Trameinae
- Tribe: Trameini
- Genus: Hydrobasileus; Kirby, 1889

Type species
- Hydrobasileus vittatus

= Hydrobasileus =

Genus of dragonflies

Hydrobasileus is a small genus of dragonflies in the family Libellulidae, found in Southeast Asia, Indonesia, New Guinea, the Solomon Islands and Australia.

== Etymology ==
The genus name Hydrobasileus is derived from the Greek ὕδωρ (hydōr, "water") and βασιλεύς (basileus, "king").

== Species ==
The genus Hydrobasileus includes the following three species:

Male	Female	Scientific name	Common name	Distribution
		Hydrobasileus brevistylus (Brauer, 1865)	water prince	Australia
		Hydrobasileus croceus (Brauer, 1867)	amber-winged marsh glider	Sri Lanka, India
		Hydrobasileus vittatus Kirby, 1889		New Guinea, Indonesia

== See also ==
- List of Odonata species of Australia
