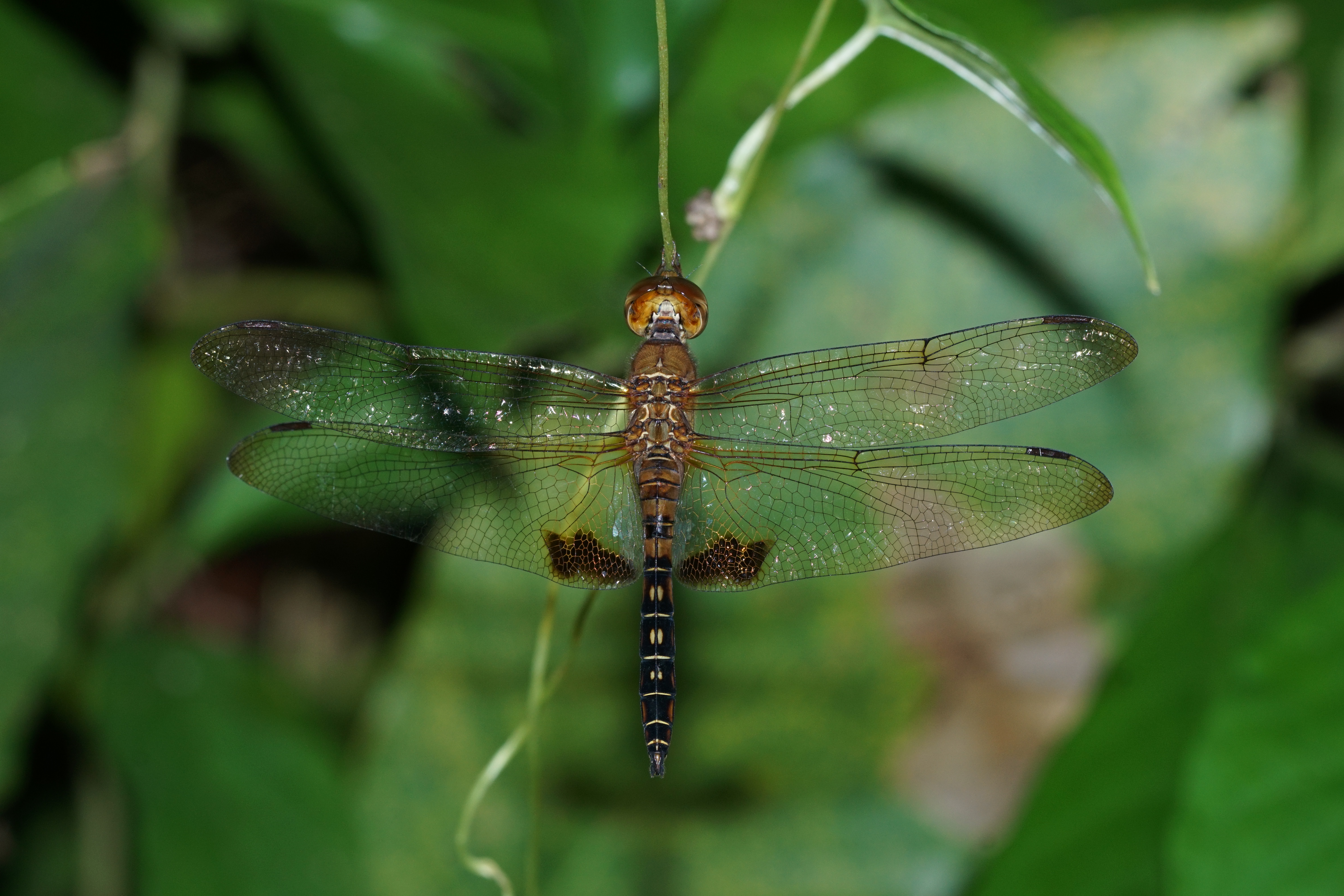

Conservation status
- Least Concern (IUCN 3.1)

Scientific classification
- Kingdom: Animalia
- Phylum: Arthropoda
- Class: Insecta
- Order: Odonata
- Infraorder: Anisoptera
- Family: Libellulidae
- Genus: Hydrobasileus
- Species: H. croceus

Binomial name
- Hydrobasileus croceus (Brauer, 1867)

Synonyms
- Tramea croceus Brauer, 1867; Tramea extranea Hagen, 1867

= Hydrobasileus croceus =

Amber-winged marsh glider

Species of dragonfly

Hydrobasileus croceus, the amber-winged marsh glider, is a species of dragonfly in the family Libellulidae. It is a widely distributed species in many Asian countries.

== Description and habitat ==
It is a large reddish-brown dragonfly with golden-amber tinted wings. Eyes are reddish-brown above, yellowish below. Its thorax is ohvaceous suffused with golden reddish-brown, Its base of hind-wings have a moderately broad dark reddish-brown mark. Abdomen is olivaceous, changing to ochreous towards anal end, marked with black. Segments 4 to 9 have apical and basal dorsal black wedge-shaped spots.

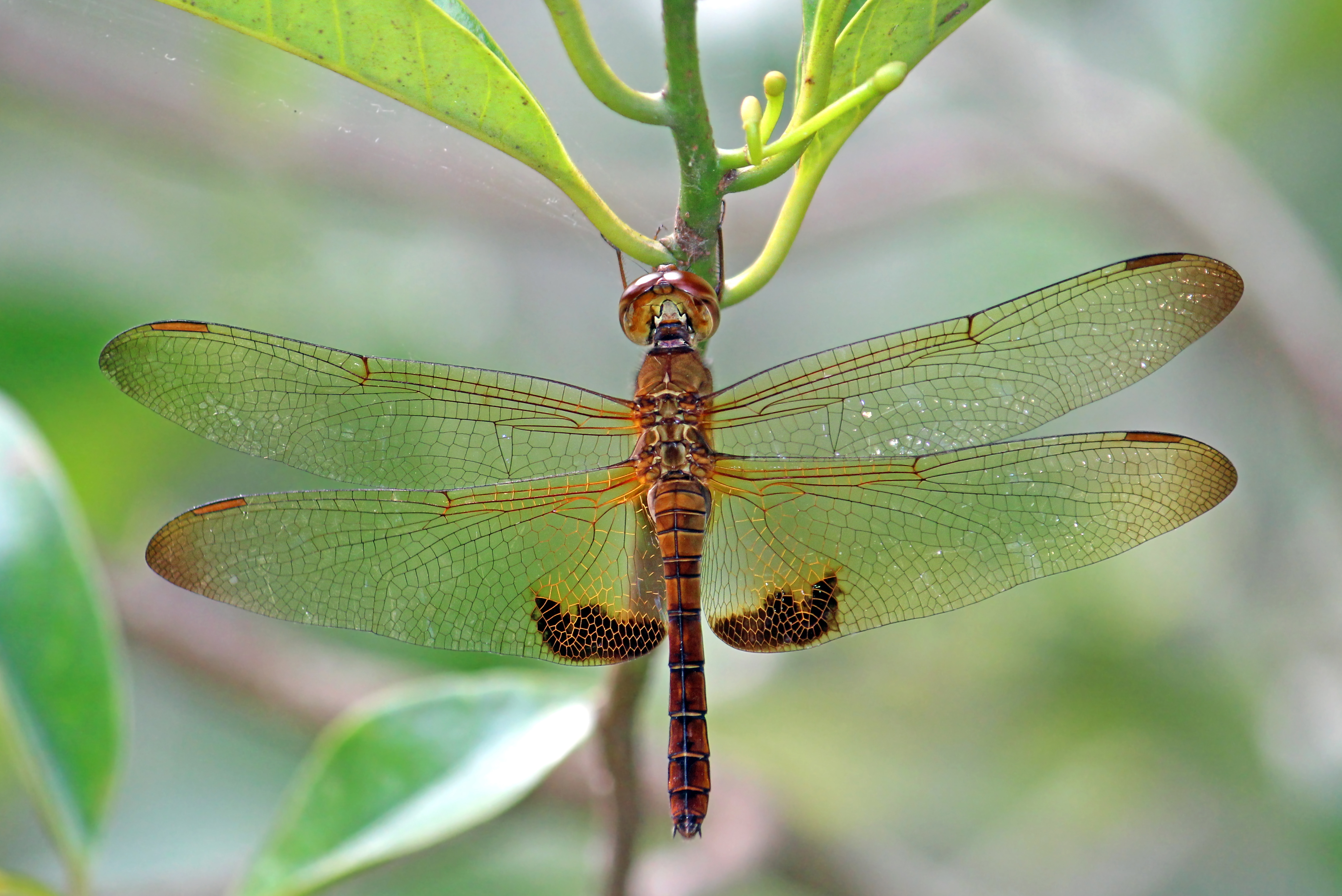
Female

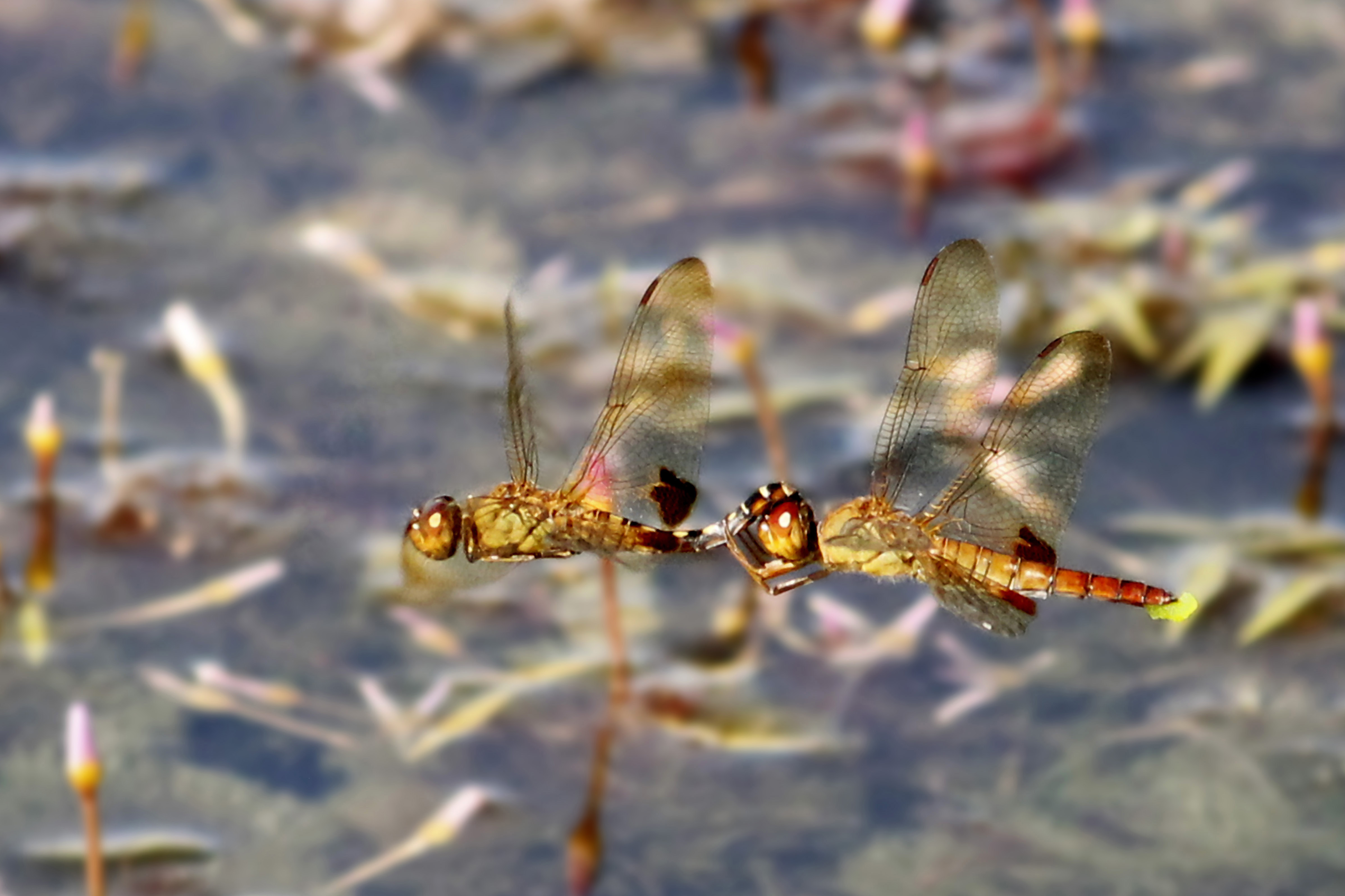
Egg laying

It breeds in weedy ponds and lakes. The male is often seen patrolling over water, and rarely perches. When perched, they prefer to hang vertically on twigs inside dense shrubbery.

== See also ==
- List of odonates of Sri Lanka
- List of odonates of India
- List of odonata of Kerala
