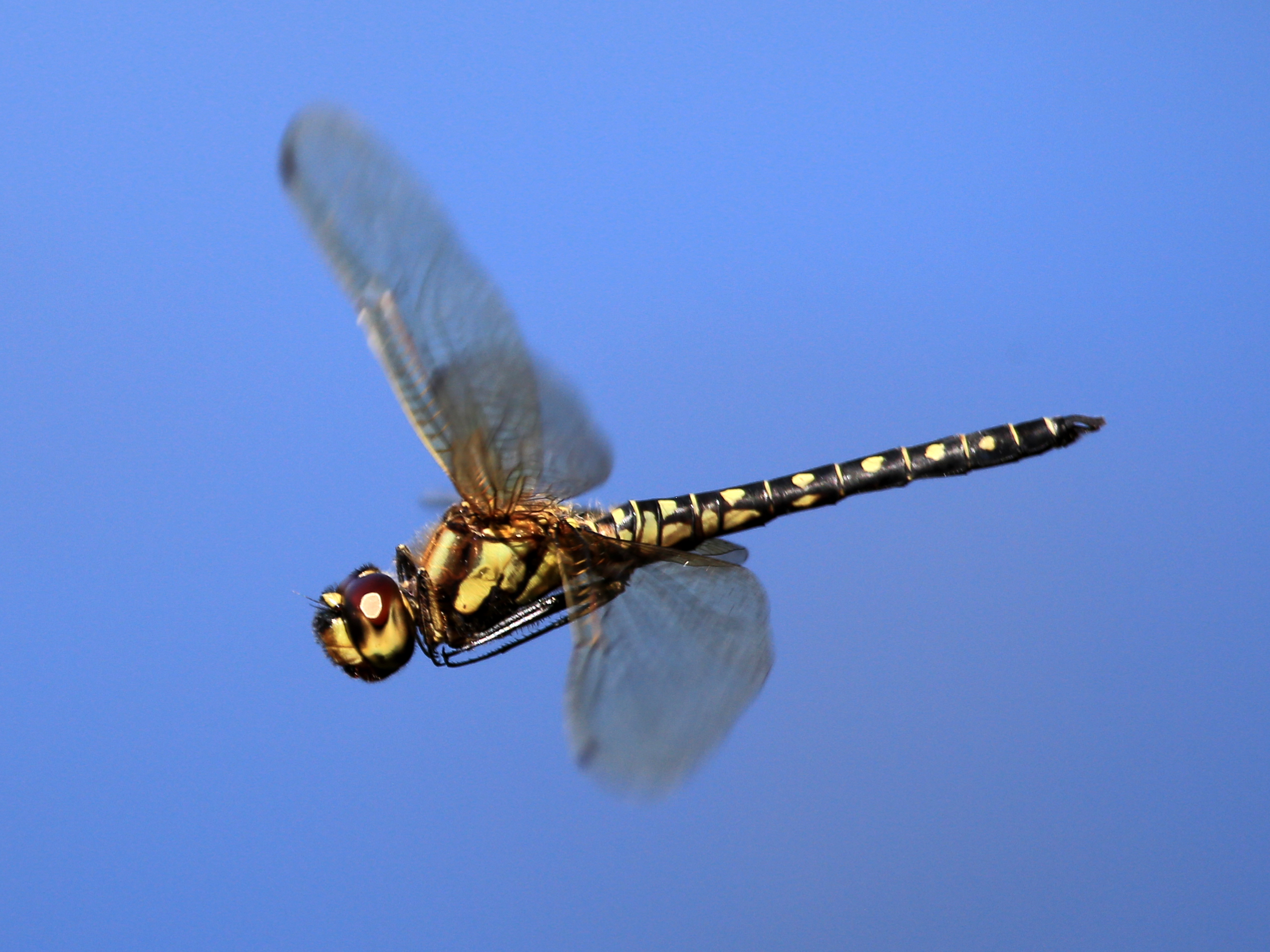
- Male
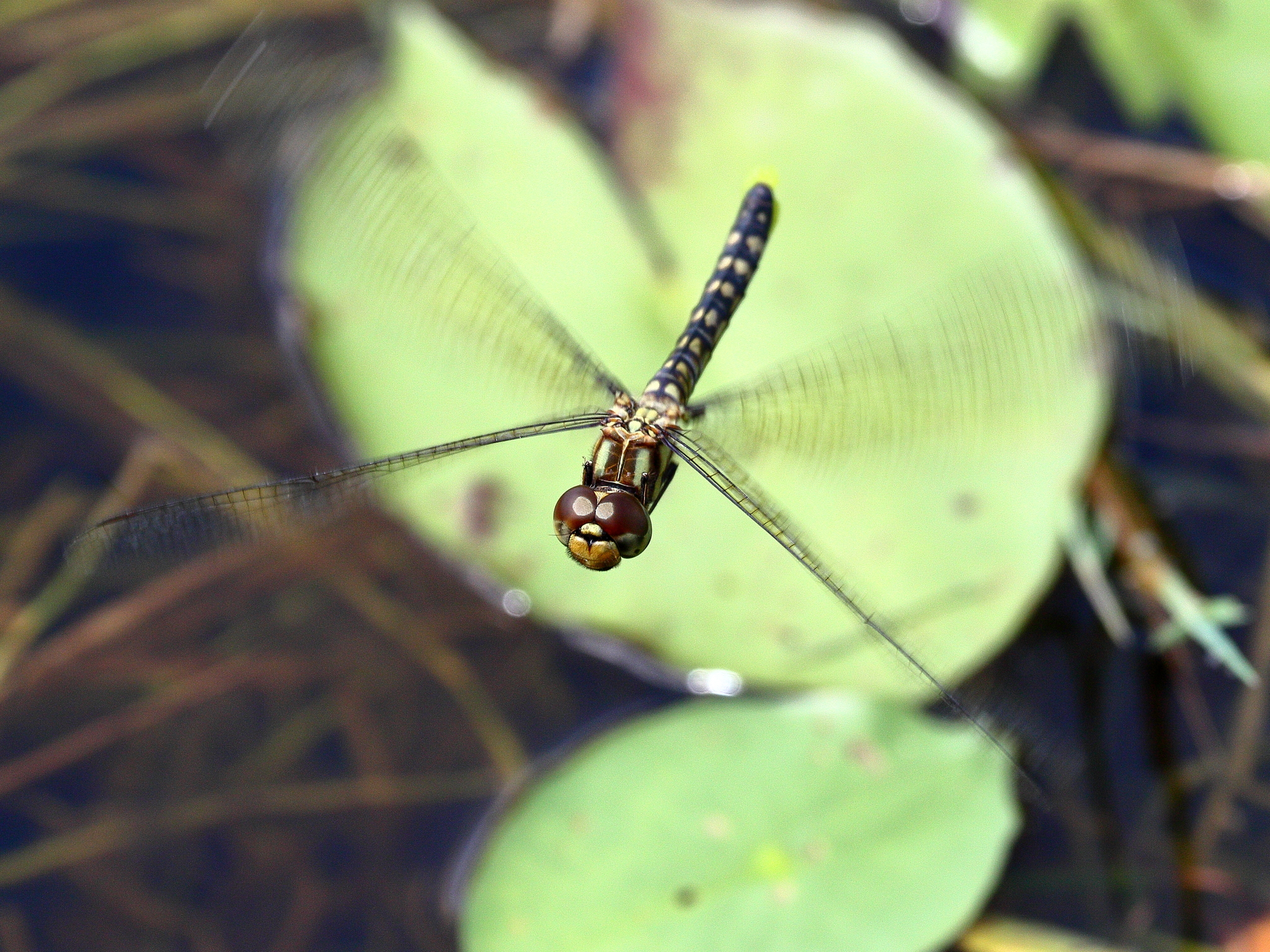
- Female

Conservation status
- Least Concern (IUCN 3.1)

Scientific classification
- Kingdom: Animalia
- Phylum: Arthropoda
- Clade: Pancrustacea
- Class: Insecta
- Order: Odonata
- Infraorder: Anisoptera
- Family: Libellulidae
- Genus: Hydrobasileus
- Species: H. brevistylus

Binomial name
- Hydrobasileus brevistylus (Brauer, 1865),

Synonyms
- Tramea brevistyla Brauer, 1865

= Hydrobasileus brevistylus =

Species of dragonfly

Hydrobasileus brevistylus is a species of dragonfly in the family Libellulidae, known as the water prince. It is found in Southeast Asia, Indonesia, New Guinea, the Solomon Islands and Australia.

Its natural habitats are freshwater swamps, lakes and ponds. The adult is a large dragonfly (wingspan 100mm, length 55mm) with its head and thorax black and yellow in colour. The abdomen is black with large yellow spots. In Australia, it ranges from the Northern Territory to Queensland and central New South Wales. The taxon has not been assessed in the IUCN Red List.

== Etymology ==
The genus name Hydrobasileus is derived from the Greek ὕδωρ (hydōr, "water") and βασιλεύς (basileus, "king").

The species name brevistylus is derived from the Latin brevis ("short") and stilus ("a pointed instrument for writing"), referring to the short female appendages, known as styli.

== Gallery ==
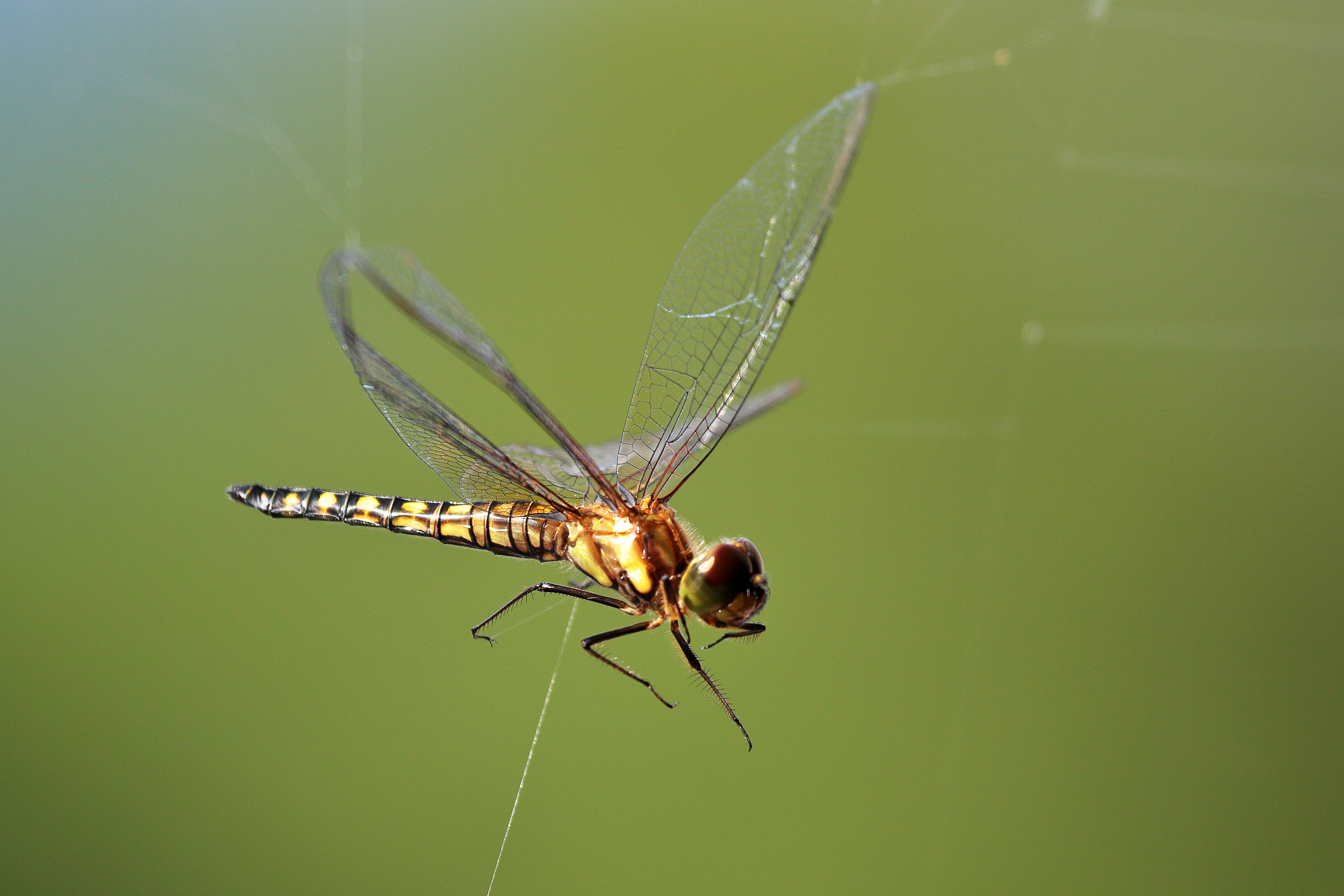
Female caught in spider web

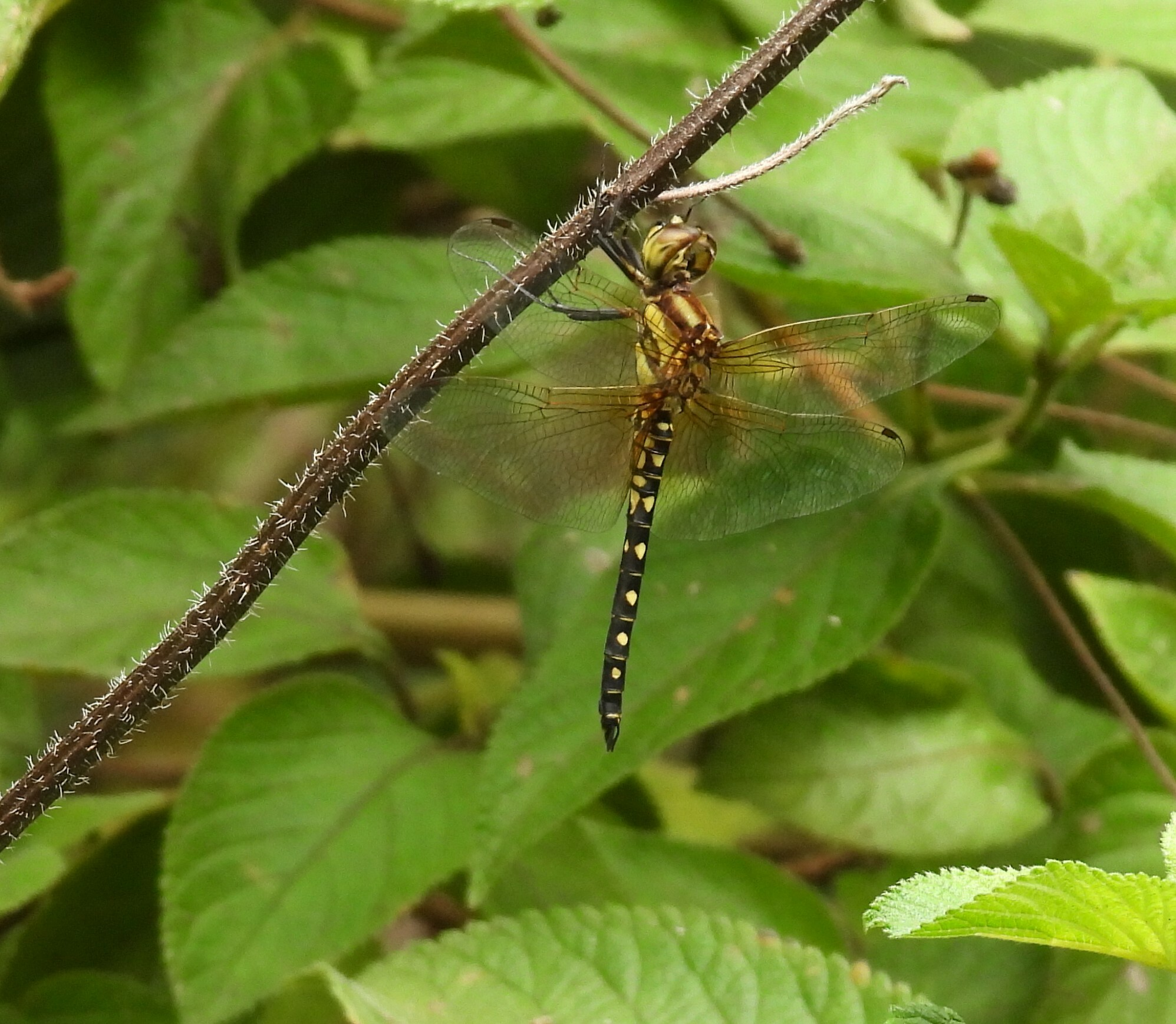
Male

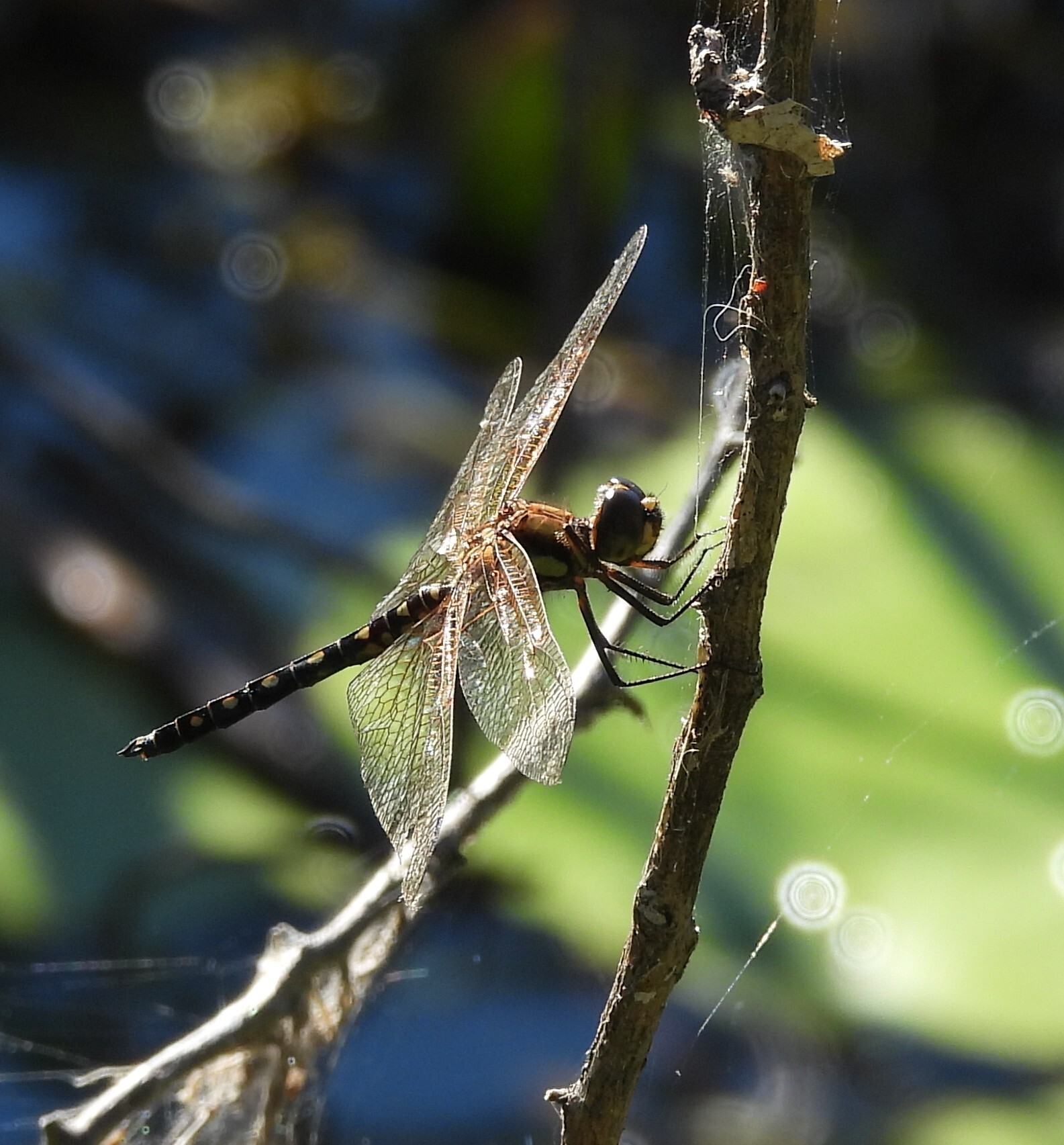
Male

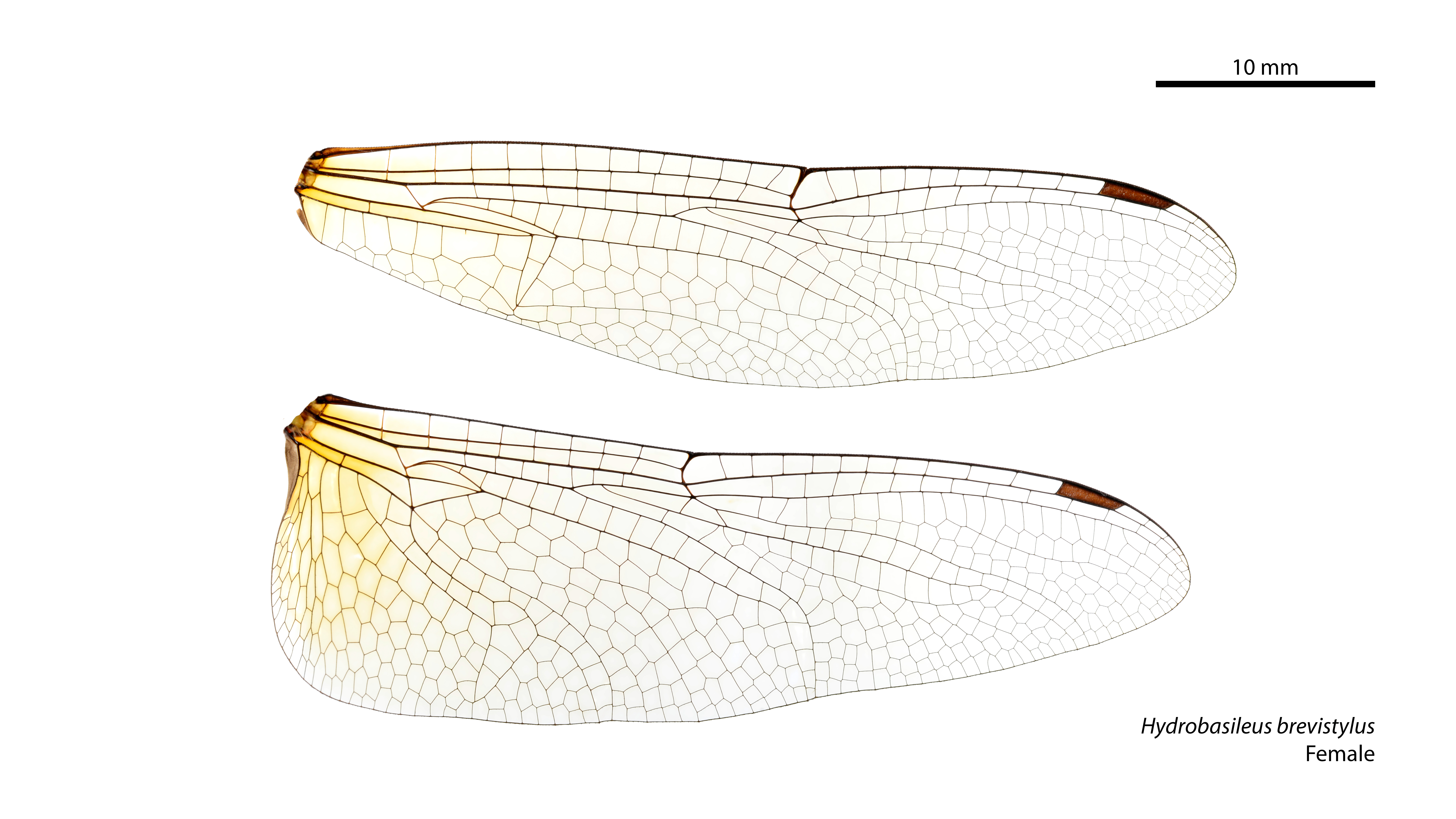
Female wings

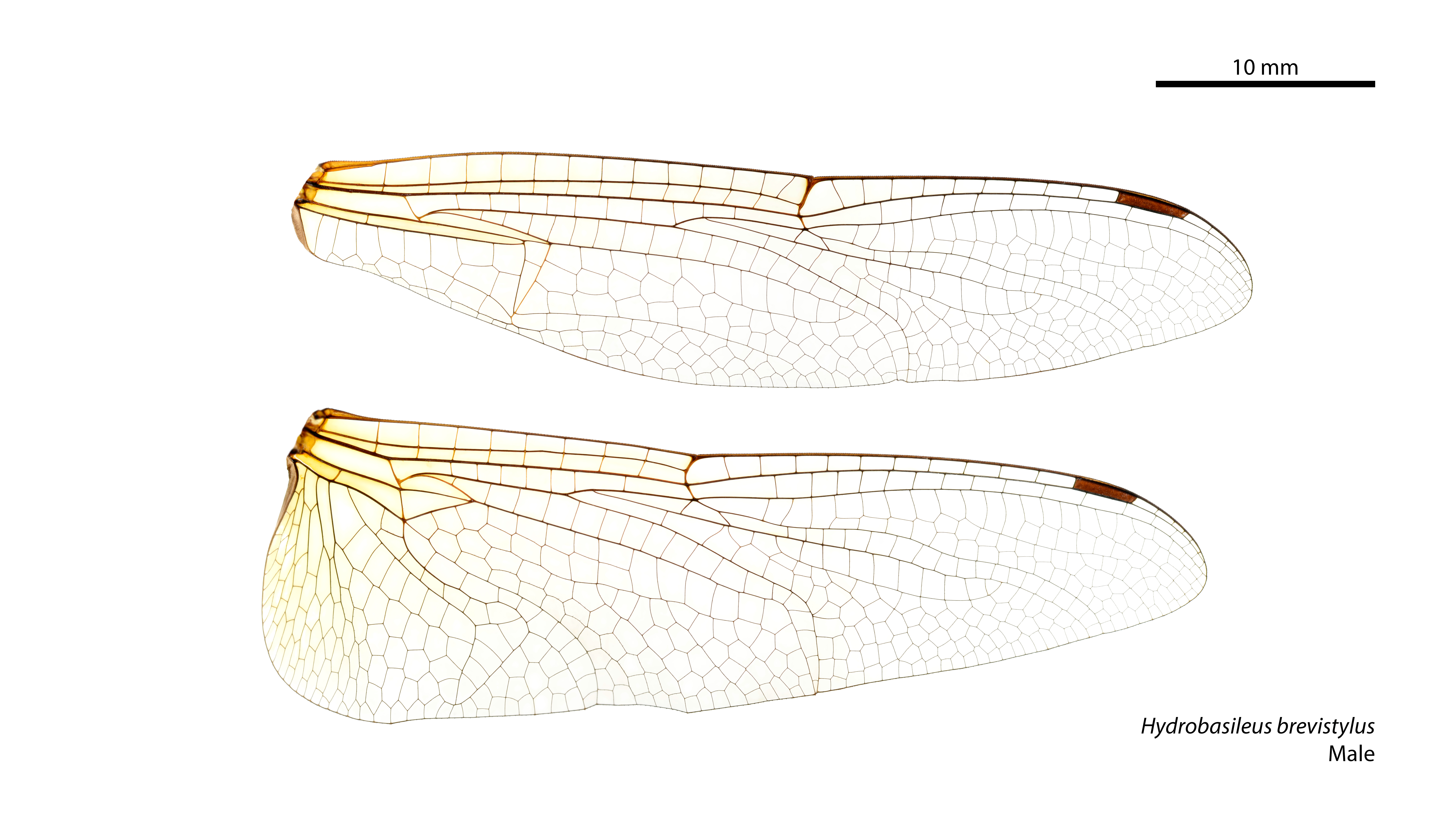
Male wings

== See also ==
- List of Odonata species of Australia
