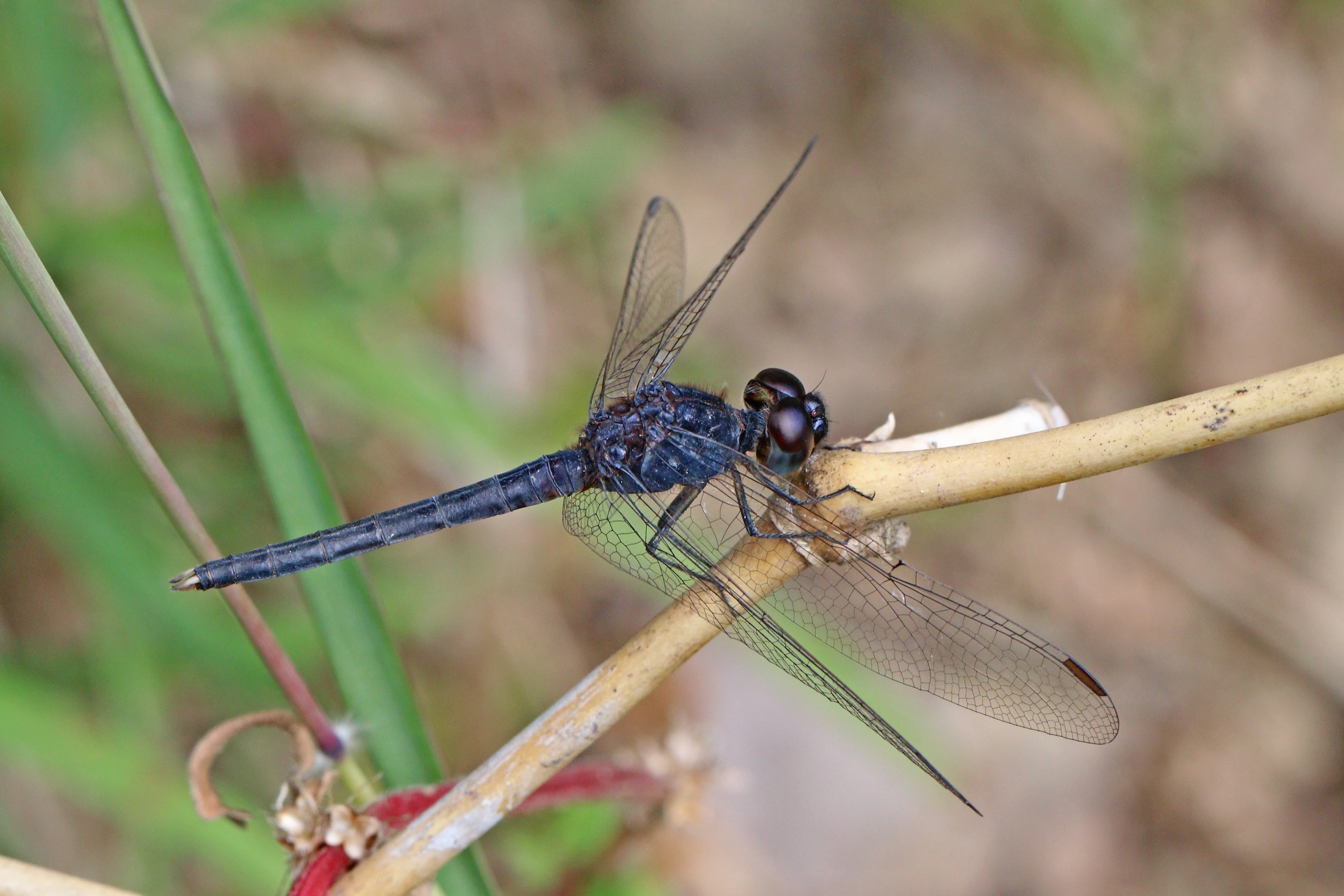
- Male
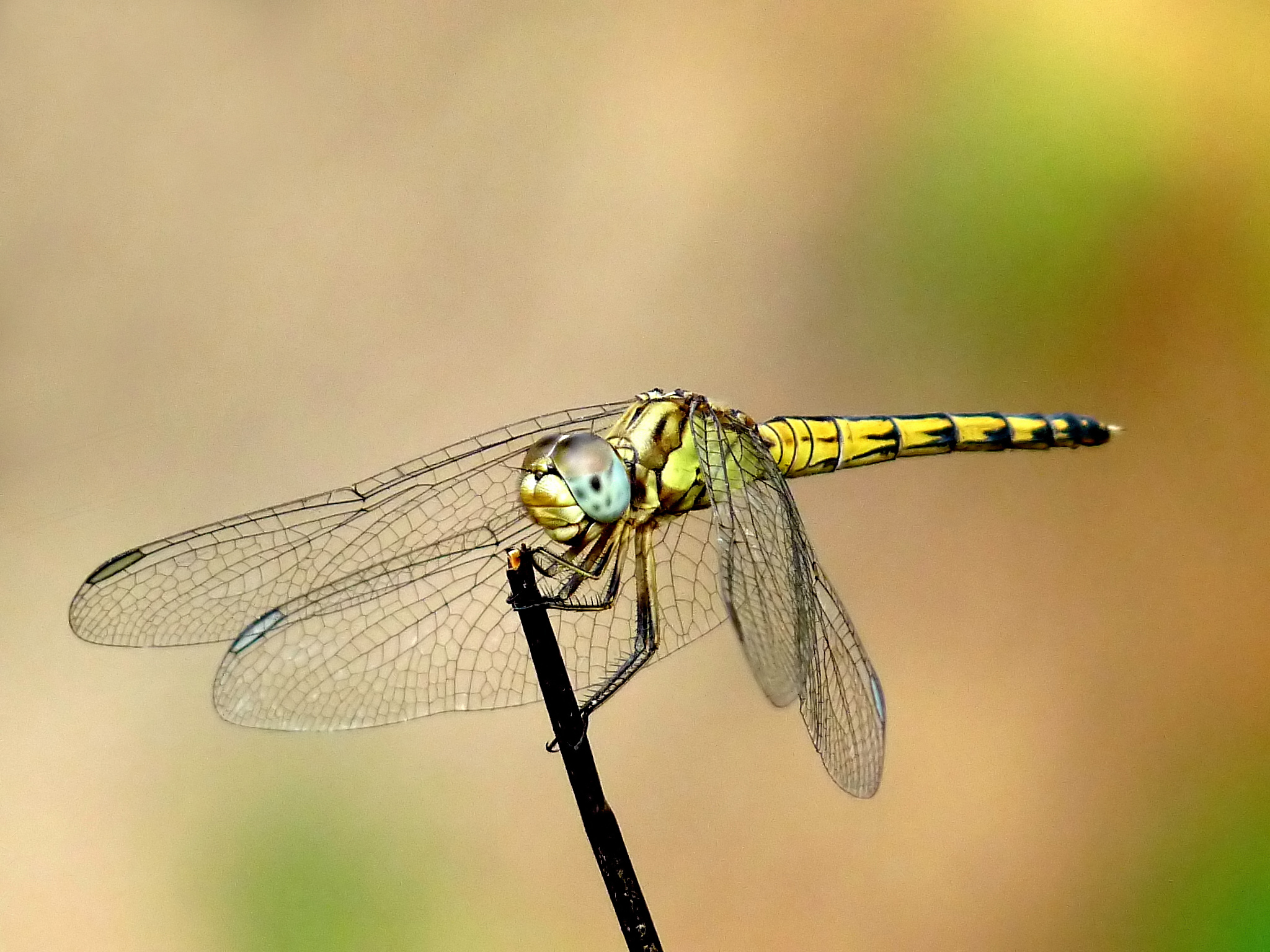
- Female

Conservation status
- Least Concern (IUCN 3.1)

Scientific classification
- Kingdom: Animalia
- Phylum: Arthropoda
- Class: Insecta
- Order: Odonata
- Infraorder: Anisoptera
- Family: Libellulidae
- Genus: Indothemis
- Species: I. carnatica

Binomial name
- Indothemis carnatica (Fabricius, 1798)

Synonyms
- Libellula carnatica Fabricius, 1798; Libellula caesia Rambur, 1842

= Indothemis carnatica =

Species of dragonfly

Indothemis carnatica, the black marsh skimmer, or light-tipped demon, is a species of dragonfly in the family Libellulidae. It is found in India, Sri Lanka and Thailand.

== Description and habitat ==
It is a small dark violaceous or blackish-brown dragonfly with yellow markings obscurely showing through. Its thorax is blackish-brown, obscured with pruinescence and appears uniformly dark violaceous in full adults. Young males and females are yellowish. Abdomen is dark violaceous with yellow markings obscurely showing through. Its anal appendages are pale yellow tipped with black.

Female differs very widely from the male in colour and markings. Its thorax is golden-yellow on dorsum, pale greenish-yellow laterally. There is a diffuse brown antehumeral stripe. Abdomen is golden-yellow on dorsum, fading to greenish-yellow laterally, marked with black and reddish-brown. There is a narrow sub-dorsal stripe extending in a very broken manner from segment 2 to the end of abdomen. There is a mid-dorsal stripe black on carina, brown at its borders extending from segment 2 to 9, broadening on the terminal segments and becoming confluent with the sub-dorsal stripe. Segment 10 is yellow, with base and apical border narrowly black. Anal appendages are pale yellow tipped with black.

It breeds in weeded ponds and lakes.

== See also ==
- List of odonates of Sri Lanka
- List of odonates of India
- List of odonata of Kerala
