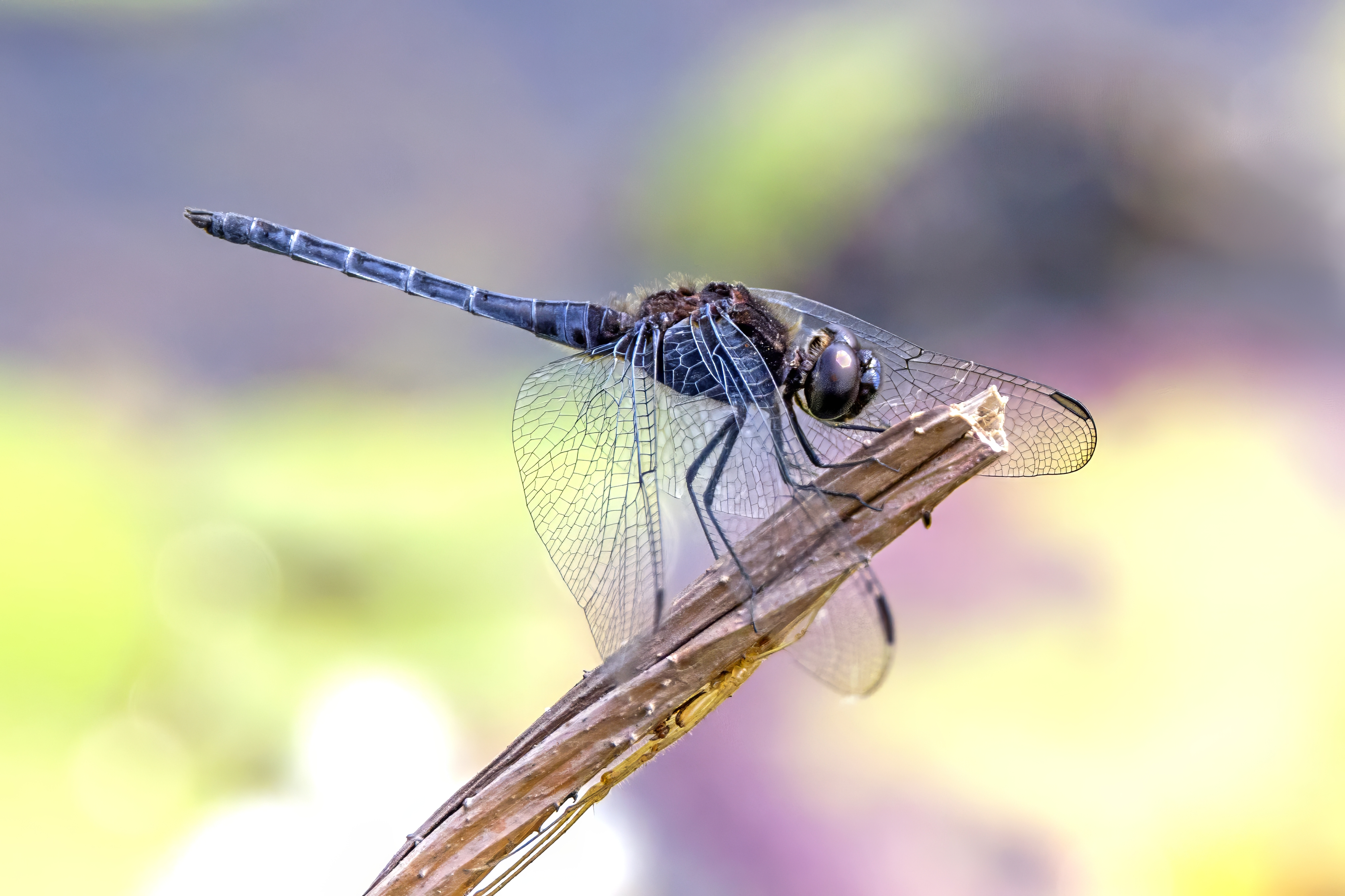

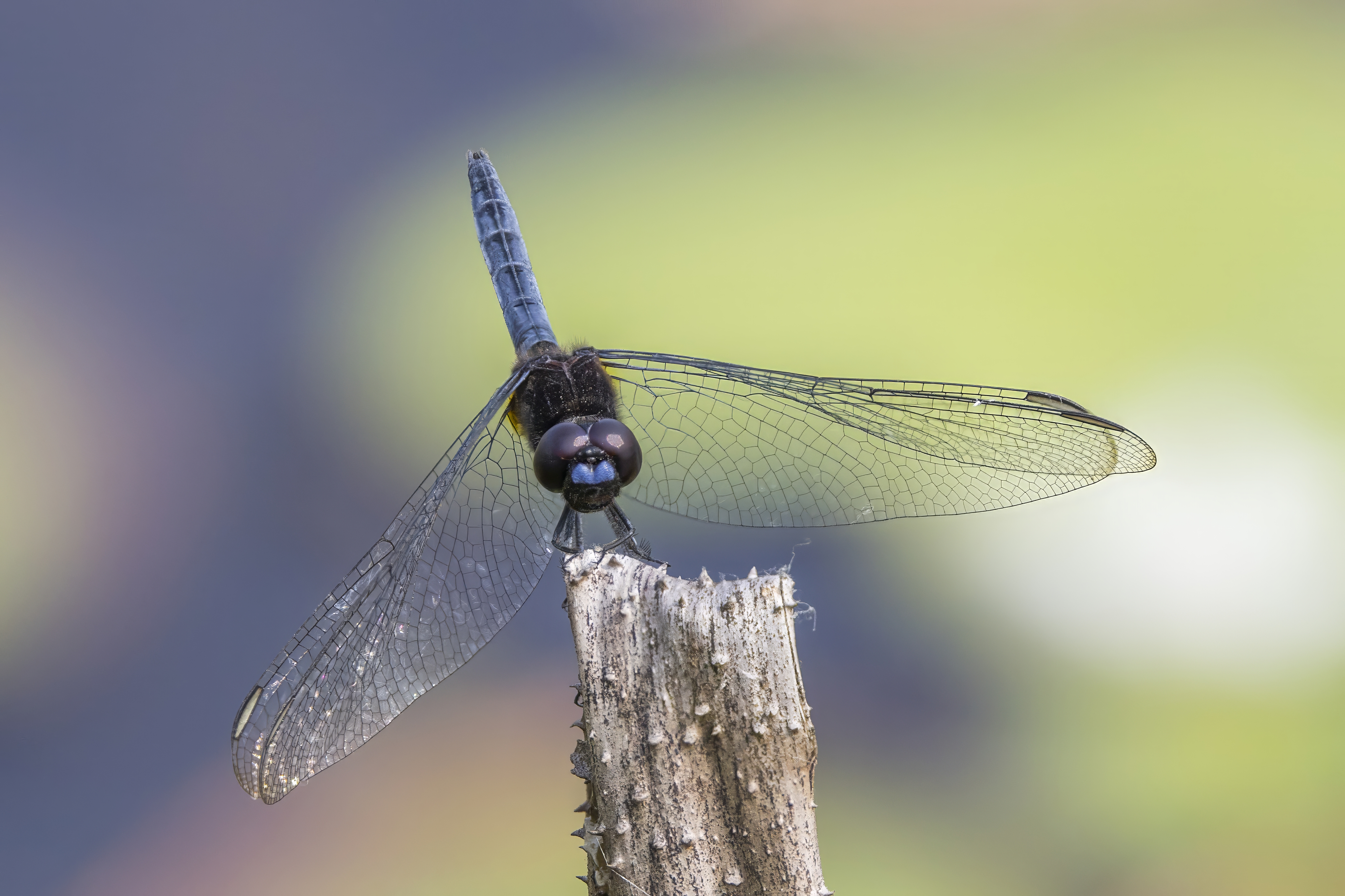
- Male in Laos

Conservation status
- Least Concern (IUCN 3.1)

Scientific classification
- Kingdom: Animalia
- Phylum: Arthropoda
- Clade: Pancrustacea
- Class: Insecta
- Order: Odonata
- Infraorder: Anisoptera
- Family: Libellulidae
- Genus: Indothemis
- Species: I. limbata

Binomial name
- Indothemis limbata (Selys, 1891)

= Indothemis limbata =

Species of dragonfly

Indothemis limbata, the restless demon, is a species of dragonfly in the family Libellulidae. It is found in India, Sri Lanka, Myanmar, Singapore and Thailand. Two subspecies can be found.

== Subspecies ==
- Indothemis limbata limbata (Selys, 1891)
- Indothemis limbata sita Campion, 1923

== Description and habitat ==
It is a small black dragonfly with yellow markings. Its eyes and thorax are black. Abdomen is also black, marked with yellow spots, obscured with bluish pruinescence in full adults. Bases of wings are dark. Apices of the wings are narrowly black; but transparent in I. l. sita. Anal appendages are dark.

Female has brown eyes and yellow thorax, marked with black. The bases of wings are in amber-yellow. Abdomen is black, marked with yellow spots up to segment 8. Anal appendages are dark.

It breeds in weeded ponds and lakes.

== See also ==
- List of odonates of Sri Lanka
- List of odonates of India
- List of odonata of Kerala
