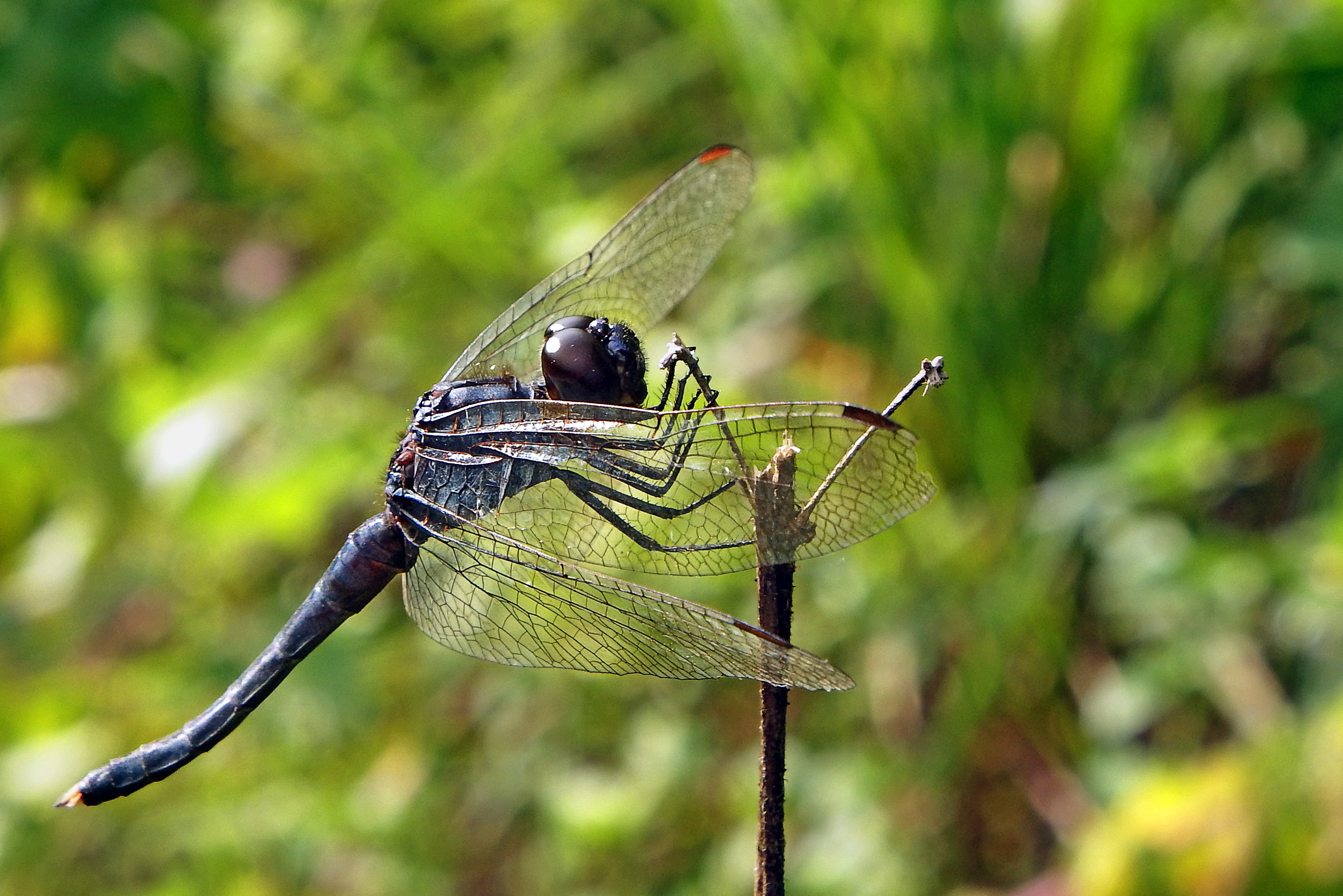
- Indothemis carnatica

Scientific classification
- Kingdom: Animalia
- Phylum: Arthropoda
- Clade: Pancrustacea
- Class: Insecta
- Order: Odonata
- Infraorder: Anisoptera
- Family: Libellulidae
- Genus: Indothemis; Ris, 1909

Diversity
- 2 species

= Indothemis =

Genus of dragonflies

Indothemis is a genus of dragonfly in the family Libellulidae.

== Species ==
The genus Indothemis includes two species:.

Male	Female	Scientific name	Common name	Distribution
		Indothemis carnatica (Fabricius, 1798)	black marsh skimmer, light-tipped demon	India, Sri Lanka and Thailand.
		Indothemis limbata (Selys, 1891)		India, Sri Lanka, Myanmar, Singapore and Thailand
