= List of Oecetis species =

This is a list of 360 species in Oecetis, a genus of long-horned caddisflies in the family Leptoceridae.

== Oecetis species ==
- Oecetis abhinagupta Schmid, 1995^{i c g}
- Oecetis absimilis Kimmins, 1962^{i c g}
- Oecetis accola Neboiss, 1989^{i c g}
- Oecetis acuminata Kimmins, 1962^{i c g}
- Oecetis acuta Ulmer, 1931^{i c g}
- Oecetis adanis Kobayashi, 1987^{i c g}
- Oecetis adelaidica Wells, 2000^{i c g}
- Oecetis aeoloptera Kimmins in Mosely & Kimmins, 1953^{i c g}
- Oecetis aequatorialis Marlier, 1958^{i c g}
- Oecetis afra Mosely, 1934^{i c g}
- Oecetis africana Kimmins, 1957^{i c g}
- Oecetis aganda Mosely, 1936^{i c g}
- Oecetis akimi Gibbs, 1973^{i c g}
- Oecetis albescens Mosely, 1930^{i c g}
- Oecetis albicornis Martin, 1931^{i c g}
- Oecetis albopunctata (Lestage, 1919)^{i c g}
- Oecetis alexanderi Kumanski in Kumanski & Malicky, 1976^{i c g}
- Oecetis alticolaria Mey, 1998^{i c g}
- Oecetis amazonica (Banks, 1924)^{i c g}
- Oecetis ancylocerca Yang & Morse, 2000^{i c g}
- Oecetis angelae ^{g}
- Oecetis angirasa Schmid, 1995^{i c g}
- Oecetis angulata Kimmins, 1963^{i c g}
- Oecetis angusta (Banks, 1920)^{i c}
- Oecetis angustipennis (Martynov, 1936)^{i c g}
- Oecetis aniruddha Schmid, 1995^{i c g}
- Oecetis anomala Marlier, 1943^{i c g}
- Oecetis antennata (Martynov, 1935)^{i c g}
- Oecetis apicipennis (Banks, 1913)^{i c g}
- Oecetis appendiculata Ulmer, 1923^{i c g}
- Oecetis arawana Neboiss, 1989^{i c g}
- Oecetis arcada Mosely in Mosely & Kimmins, 1953^{i c g}
- Oecetis arctipennis Kimmins, 1962^{i c g}
- Oecetis arizonica Denning, 1951^{i c g}
- Oecetis asciata Gibbs, 1973^{i c g}
- Oecetis asmada Malicky, 1979^{i c g}
- Oecetis asmanista Mosely in Mosely & Kimmins, 1953^{i c g}
- Oecetis assamensis Kimmins, 1963^{i c g}
- Oecetis asymmetrica Kimmins, 1962^{i c g}
- Oecetis atarpa Mosely in Mosely & Kimmins, 1953^{i c g}
- Oecetis atpomarus Malicky, 1992^{i c g}
- Oecetis australis (Banks, 1920)^{i c g}
- Oecetis avara (Banks, 1895)^{i c g}
- Oecetis barbarae Neboiss, 1989^{i c g}
- Oecetis belihuloya Malicky, 1973^{i c g}
- Oecetis bellula Yang & Morse, 2000^{i c g}
- Oecetis bengalica Martynov, 1936^{i c g}
- Oecetis berneri Kimmins, 1957^{i c g}
- Oecetis bhairava Schmid, 1995^{i c g}
- Oecetis bhavabhuti Schmid, 1995^{i c g}
- Oecetis bicaudata Navás, 1931^{i c g}
- Oecetis bicuspida Gibbs, 1973^{i c g}
- Oecetis bilobosa Flint, 1974^{i c g}
- Oecetis biramosa Martynov, 1936^{i c g}
- Oecetis blythi Wells, 2000^{i c g}
- Oecetis brachyura Yang & Morse, 1997^{i c g}
- Oecetis brevis Kimmins, 1963^{i c g}
- Oecetis brignolii Malicky, 1981^{i c g}
- Oecetis brunnescens (Ulmer, 1923)^{i c g}
- Oecetis buitenzorgensis Ulmer, 1951^{i c g}
- Oecetis bullata Yang & Morse, 1997^{i c g}
- Oecetis burtoni Neboiss, 1978^{i c g}
- Oecetis caelum Chen & Morce, 1992^{g}
- Oecetis canariensis Brauer, 1900^{i c g}
- Oecetis carlibanezae ^{g}
- Oecetis carvalhoi Marlier, 1965^{i c g}
- Oecetis catenulata Neboiss, 1989^{i c g}
- Oecetis caucula Yang & Morse, 2000^{i c g}
- Oecetis caudata Navás, 1936^{i c g}
- Oecetis ceylanica (Ulmer, 1915)^{i c g}
- Oecetis chathamensis Tillyard, 1925^{i c g}
- Oecetis chipiriri ^{g}
- Oecetis cinerascens (Hagen, 1861)^{i c g b}
- Oecetis circinata Gibbs, 1973^{i c g}
- Oecetis claggi Banks, 1937^{i c g}
- Oecetis clavata Yang & Morse, 2000^{i c g}
- Oecetis cochleata Marlier, 1956^{i c g}
- Oecetis cohaesa Mey, 1998^{i c g}
- Oecetis comalis Yang & Morse, 2000^{i c g}
- Oecetis complex Hwang, 1957^{i c g}
- Oecetis complexa Kimmins in Mosely & Kimmins, 1953^{i c g}
- Oecetis connata Flint, 1974^{i c g}
- Oecetis coomana Navás, 1932^{i c g}
- Oecetis cornuata Yang & Morse, 2000^{i c g}
- Oecetis crassicornis Ulmer, 1930^{i c g}
- Oecetis cristata Kimmins, 1963^{i c g}
- Oecetis cymula Neboiss, 1982^{i c g}
- Oecetis cyrtocercis Yang & Morse, 2000^{i c g}
- Oecetis dakchineswara Schmid, 1995^{i c g}
- Oecetis danielae ^{g}
- Oecetis daytona Ross, 1947^{i c g}
- Oecetis decora Kimmins, 1957^{i c g}
- Oecetis desaegeri Jacquemart, 1967^{i c g}
- Oecetis devakiputra Schmid, 1995^{i c g}
- Oecetis dhatusena Schmid, 1958^{i c g}
- Oecetis diclava Mey, 1998^{i c g}
- Oecetis dilata Yang & Morse, 2000^{i c g}
- Oecetis disjuncta (Banks, 1920)^{i c g}
- Oecetis ditissa Ross, 1966^{i c g}
- Oecetis doesburgi Flint, 1974^{i c g}
- Oecetis dominguezi Rueda Martin & al., 2011^{g}
- Oecetis dvichakha Schmid, 1975^{i c g}
- Oecetis eburnea Schmid, 1961^{i c g}
- Oecetis eddlestoni Ross, 1938^{i c g}
- Oecetis elata Denning & Sykora, 1966^{i c g}
- Oecetis elouardi Gibon & Randriamasimanana in Randriamasimanana & Gibon, 1998^{i c g}
- Oecetis empusa Malicky & Chaibu in Malicky, 2000^{i c g}
- Oecetis epekeina Neboiss, 1989^{i c g}
- Oecetis evigra Chen & Morce, 1992^{g}
- Oecetis excisa Ulmer, 1907^{i c g}
- Oecetis fahieni Schmid, 1958^{i c g}
- Oecetis falicia Denning in Denning & Sykora, 1966^{i c g}
- Oecetis fasciata Lestage, 1919^{i c g}
- Oecetis fimbriata Navás, 1935^{i c g}
- Oecetis flavicoma Mey, 1998^{i c g}
- Oecetis fletcheri Kimmins, 1963^{i c g}
- Oecetis floridanus (Banks, 1905)^{i c}
- Oecetis forcipata Kimmins, 1961^{i c g}
- Oecetis furva (Rambur, 1842)^{i c g}
- Oecetis fuscata Kimmins, 1956^{i c g}
- Oecetis georgia Ross, 1941^{i c g}
- Oecetis ghibensis Kimmins, 1963^{i c g}
- Oecetis glebula Wells, 2000^{i c g}
- Oecetis goodmani Randriamasimanana & Gibon, 1998^{i c g}
- Oecetis goraknata Schmid, 1995^{i c g}
- Oecetis gradata Ulmer, 1923^{i c g}
- Oecetis granulosa Jacquemart, 1961^{i c g}
- Oecetis graphata Mey, 1998^{i c g}
- Oecetis grazalemae Gonzalez & Iglesias, 1989^{i c g}
- Oecetis guamana (Fischer, 1970)^{i c g}
- Oecetis gunapatya Schmid, 1995^{i c g}
- Oecetis hamata (Ulmer, 1915)^{i c g}
- Oecetis hamochiensis Kobayashi, 1984^{i c g}
- Oecetis harivamsa Schmid, 1995^{i c g}
- Oecetis hayagriva Schmid, 1995^{i c g}
- Oecetis hemerobioides (McLachlan, 1866)^{i c g}
- Oecetis hertui Randriamasimanana & Gibon, 1999^{i c g}
- Oecetis hiranyakachipu Schmid, 1995^{i c g}
- Oecetis hiranyaksa Schmid, 1995^{i c g}
- Oecetis hoelzeli Malicky, 1983^{i c g}
- Oecetis hulstaerti Navás, 1931^{i c g}
- Oecetis iara ^{g}
- Oecetis ichtadevata Schmid, 1995^{i c g}
- Oecetis ichtadvaraka Schmid, 1995^{i c g}
- Oecetis ichtasurama Schmid, 1995^{i c g}
- Oecetis ichvara Schmid, 1995^{i c g}
- Oecetis iguazu Flint, 1983^{i c g}
- Oecetis immobilis (Hagen, 1861)^{i c g}
- Oecetis inconspicua (Walker, 1852)^{i c g b}
- Oecetis indivisa (Martynov, 1936)^{i c g}
- Oecetis inflata Flint, 1974^{i c g}
- Oecetis inscripta Kimmins in Mosely & Kimmins, 1953^{i c g}
- Oecetis insignis (Banks, 1911)^{i c g}
- Oecetis insymmetrica Mey, 1998^{i c g}
- Oecetis intima McLachlan, 1877^{i c g}
- Oecetis intramontana Mey, 1998^{i c g}
- Oecetis iti McFarlane, 1964^{i c g}
- Oecetis jacobsoni Ulmer, 1930^{i c g}
- Oecetis janseni Navás, 1931^{i c g}
- Oecetis jasikana Gibbs, 1973^{i c g}
- Oecetis jayadeva Schmid, 1995^{i c g}
- Oecetis kagerana (Kimmins, 1956)^{i c g}
- Oecetis kakaduensis Neboiss, 1989^{i c g}
- Oecetis kalidasa Schmid, 1995^{i c g}
- Oecetis kalyuga Schmid, 1995^{i c g}
- Oecetis kambaitensis Kimmins, 1963^{i c g}
- Oecetis kartavirya Schmid, 1995^{i c g}
- Oecetis karttikeya Schmid, 1995^{i c g}
- Oecetis kasenyii Jacquemart, 1959^{i c g}
- Oecetis kathia Mosely, 1939^{i c g}
- Oecetis keraia Neboiss, 1989^{i c g}
- Oecetis kimminsi Kumanski, 1979^{i c g}
- Oecetis knutsoni Flint, 1981^{i c g}
- Oecetis kolobota Neboiss, 1989^{i c g}
- Oecetis koyana Kimmins, 1955^{i c g}
- Oecetis kpanduna Gibbs, 1973^{i c g}
- Oecetis kulasekhara Schmid, 1995^{i c g}
- Oecetis kunenensis Barnard, 1934^{i c g}
- Oecetis kurukchetra Schmid, 1995^{i c g}
- Oecetis lacustris (Pictet, 1834)^{i c g}
- Oecetis laevis Marlier, 1965^{i c g}
- Oecetis lais (Hagen, 1859)^{i c g}
- Oecetis laminata (Hwang, 1957)^{i c g}
- Oecetis lantoyae Randriamasimanana & Gibon, 1998^{i c g}
- Oecetis lanuginosa (McLachlan, 1875)^{i c g}
- Oecetis laustra Mosely in Mosely & Kimmins, 1953^{i c g}
- Oecetis legrandi Randriamasimanana & Gibon, 1998^{i c g}
- Oecetis lilliput Marlier, 1965^{i c g}
- Oecetis lingua Schmid, 1958^{i c g}
- Oecetis lokapala Schmid, 1995^{i c g}
- Oecetis londuca Marlier, 1965^{i c g}
- Oecetis longiterga Kimmins, 1962^{i c g}
- Oecetis lucipetens Barnard, 1940^{i c g}
- Oecetis luenae Marlier, 1965^{i c g}
- Oecetis lurida Kimmins in Mosely & Kimmins, 1953^{i c g}
- Oecetis machadoi Marlier, 1965^{i c g}
- Oecetis maculata Kimmins, 1956^{i c g}
- Oecetis maculipennis Ulmer, 1922^{i c g}
- Oecetis mahadeva (Banks, 1913)^{i c g}
- Oecetis malighawa Schmid, 1958^{i c g}
- Oecetis mambia Kimmins, 1962^{i c g}
- Oecetis marginata Kimmins, 1962^{i c g}
- Oecetis marojejyensis Randriamasimanana & Gibon, 1999^{i c g}
- Oecetis marquesi Bueno-Soria, 1981^{i c g}
- Oecetis maspeluda Botosaneanu, 1977^{i c g}
- Oecetis mbeloae Randriamasimanana & Gibon, 1998^{i c g}
- Oecetis meghadouta Schmid, 1958^{i c g}
- Oecetis mekana Kimmins, 1963^{i c g}
- Oecetis metlacensis Bueno-Soria, 1981^{i c g}
- Oecetis michaeli Malicky, 1999^{i c g}
- Oecetis minasata Mosely in Mosely & Kimmins, 1953^{i c g}
- Oecetis minuscula Yang & Morse, 2000^{i c g}
- Oecetis minuta Martynov, 1935^{i c g}
- Oecetis mirabilis Yang & Morse, 2000^{i c g}
- Oecetis modesta (Barnard, 1934)^{i c g}
- Oecetis molecul ^{g}
- Oecetis montana Ulmer, 1930^{i c g}
- Oecetis morii Tsuda, 1942^{i c g}
- Oecetis morsei Bueno-Soria, 1981^{i c g}
- Oecetis moureaui Marlier, 1958^{i c g}
- Oecetis multipunctata Ulmer, 1916^{i c g}
- Oecetis multispinosa Kimmins, 1963^{i c g}
- Oecetis narasimha Schmid, 1995^{i c g}
- Oecetis naravitta Schmid, 1958^{i c g}
- Oecetis nerviciliata (Schmid, 1958)^{i c g}
- Oecetis nervisquamosa (Schmid, 1958)^{i c g}
- Oecetis nigropunctata Ulmer, 1908^{i c g}
- Oecetis nocturna Ross, 1966^{i c g}
- Oecetis notata (Rambur, 1842)^{i c g}
- Oecetis oberdorffi ^{g}
- Oecetis obliqua Wells, 2000^{i c g}
- Oecetis ocellata Jacquemart, 1959^{i c g}
- Oecetis ochracea (Curtis, 1825)^{i c g}
- Oecetis ochromelas Jacquemart, 1957^{i c g}
- Oecetis octophora Mey, 1998^{i c g}
- Oecetis odanis Kobayashi, 1987^{i c g}
- Oecetis oecetinellae Mey, 1990^{i c g}
- Oecetis olgae Gibon & Randriamasimanana in Randriamasimanana & Gibon, 1998^{i c g}
- Oecetis oliae Gibon & Randriamasimanana in Randriamasimanana & Gibon, 1999^{i c g}
- Oecetis oresbiosa Neboiss, 1989^{i c g}
- Oecetis orientalis Navas, 1921^{i c g}
- Oecetis ornata Kimmins, 1962^{i c g}
- Oecetis osteni Milne, 1934^{i c g b}
- Oecetis ouachita Moulton & Stewart, 1993^{i c g}
- Oecetis ovampoensis Barnard, 1934^{i c g}
- Oecetis ozarkensis Moulton & Stewart, 1993^{i c g}
- Oecetis panayensis Mey, 1998^{i c g}
- Oecetis pancharatra Schmid, 1995^{i c g}
- Oecetis pangana Navas, 1930^{i c g}
- Oecetis paracomplexa Wells, 2000^{i c g}
- Oecetis parallela Wells, 2000^{i c g}
- Oecetis paranensis Flint, 1982^{i c g}
- Oecetis parka Mosely in Mosely & Kimmins, 1953^{i c g}
- Oecetis parmata Neboiss, 1989^{i c g}
- Oecetis parva (Banks, 1907)^{i c g}
- Oecetis paula (McLachlan, 1875)^{i c g}
- Oecetis paxilla Yang & Morse, 2000^{i c g}
- Oecetis pechana Mosely in Mosely & Kimmins, 1953^{i c g}
- Oecetis pelengensis Jacquemart, 1961^{i c g}
- Oecetis pencillata Kimmins, 1963^{i c g}
- Oecetis pentafurcata Mey, 1995^{i c g}
- Oecetis persimilis (Banks, 1907)^{i c g}
- Oecetis peruviana (Banks, 1924)^{i c g}
- Oecetis peterseni Mey, 1998^{i c g}
- Oecetis pilakai Randriamasimanana & Gibon, 1998^{i c g}
- Oecetis pilosa Banks, 1937^{i c g}
- Oecetis piptona Neboiss, 1989^{i c g}
- Oecetis portalensis Mosely, 1939^{i c g}
- Oecetis porteri Ross, 1947^{i c g}
- Oecetis prahlada Schmid, 1995^{i c g}
- Oecetis pratelia Denning, 1948^{i c g}
- Oecetis pratti Denning, 1948^{i c g}
- Oecetis pretakalpa Schmid, 1995^{i c g}
- Oecetis pretiosa (Banks, 1913)^{i c g}
- Oecetis prolixus Chen & Morce, 1992^{g}
- Oecetis prolongata Flint, 1981^{i c g}
- Oecetis pryadyumna Schmid, 1995^{i c g}
- Oecetis pseudoamazonica ^{g}
- Oecetis pseudoinconspicua Bueno-Soria, 1981^{i c g}
- Oecetis pulchella (Banks, 1936)^{i c g}
- Oecetis punctata (Navas, 1924)^{i c g}
- Oecetis punctatissima (Schmid, 1958)^{i c g}
- Oecetis punctipennis (Ulmer, 1905)^{i c g}
- Oecetis punctulata Navás, 1932^{i c g}
- Oecetis purucha Schmid, 1995^{i c g}
- Oecetis purusamedha Schmid, 1995^{i c g}
- Oecetis quadrofurcata Mey, 1998^{i c g}
- Oecetis rafaeli Flint, 1991^{i c g}
- Oecetis raghava Schmid, 1995^{i c g}
- Oecetis rajasimha Schmid, 1995^{i c g}
- Oecetis rama Mosely, 1948^{i c g}
- Oecetis rectangula Kimmins, 1963^{i c g}
- Oecetis reticulata Kimmins, 1957^{i c g}
- Oecetis reticulatella Kimmins, 1957^{i c g}
- Oecetis royi Kimmins, 1961^{i c g}
- Oecetis rufescens Navás, 1932^{i c g}
- Oecetis satyagraha Schmid, 1995^{i c g}
- Oecetis scala Milne, 1934^{i c g}
- Oecetis scirpicula Neboiss, 1977^{i c g}
- Oecetis scoparia Flint, 1974^{i c g}
- Oecetis scorpius Marlier, 1965^{i c g}
- Oecetis scutata Ulmer, 1930^{i c g}
- Oecetis scutulata Martynov, 1936^{i c g}
- Oecetis selene Marlier, 1965^{i c g}
- Oecetis semissalis Yang & Morse, 2000^{i c g}
- Oecetis separata Banks, 1937^{i c g}
- Oecetis setifera Ulmer, 1922^{i c g}
- Oecetis sibayiensis Scott, 1968^{i c g}
- Oecetis sicula Yang & Morse, 2000^{i c g}
- Oecetis silvestris Gibbs, 1973^{i c g}
- Oecetis silviae Bueno-Soria, 1981^{i c g}
- Oecetis simplex Marlier, 1956^{i c g}
- Oecetis singularis (Ulmer, 1930)^{i c g}
- Oecetis sinuata Kimmins, 1963^{i c g}
- Oecetis spatula Chen in Yang & Morse, 2000^{i c g}
- Oecetis sphyra Ross, 1941^{i c g}
- Oecetis spinifera Gibon & Randriamasimanana in Randriamasimanana & Gibon, 1998^{i c g}
- Oecetis spinosus Chen & Morce, 1992^{g}
- Oecetis squamosa Kimmins, 1962^{i c g}
- Oecetis stepheni Randriamasimanana & Gibon, 1999^{i c g}
- Oecetis striata (Kimmins, 1956)^{i c g}
- Oecetis struckii Klapalek, 1903^{i c g}
- Oecetis submaculosa Kimmins, 1963^{i c g}
- Oecetis sumanasara Schmid, 1958^{i c g}
- Oecetis sunyani Gibbs, 1973^{i c g}
- Oecetis sylveri Randriamasimanana & Gibon, 1998^{i c g}
- Oecetis symoensi Marlier, 1981^{i c g}
- Oecetis taenia Yang & Morse, 2000^{i c g}
- Oecetis tafo Gibbs, 1973^{i c g}
- Oecetis tampoloensis Randriamasimanana & Gibon, 1999^{i c g}
- Oecetis tenuis (Martynov, 1936)^{i c g}
- Oecetis terraesanctae (Botosaneanu & Gasith, 1971)^{i c g}
- Oecetis testacea (Curtis, 1834)^{i c g}
- Oecetis tetragona Marlier, 1965^{i c g}
- Oecetis thikanensis Mosely, 1939^{i c g}
- Oecetis tjonnelandi Kimmins, 1963^{i c g}
- Oecetis townesorum Morse, 1974^{i c g}
- Oecetis traini ^{g}
- Oecetis tripunctata (Fabricius, 1793)^{i c g}
- Oecetis tsudai Fischer, 1970^{i c g}
- Oecetis udayakara Schmid, 1995^{i c g}
- Oecetis umbra Neboiss, 1977^{i c g}
- Oecetis unicolor (McLachlan, 1868)^{i c g}
- Oecetis uniforma Yang & Morse, 2000^{i c g}
- Oecetis upadana Schmid, 1995^{i c g}
- Oecetis uptoni Wells, 2000^{i c g}
- Oecetis uyulala Malicky & Lounaci, 1987^{i c g}
- Oecetis vanaprachta Schmid, 1995^{i c g}
- Oecetis vasugupta Schmid, 1995^{i c g}
- Oecetis vidhyadara Schmid, 1995^{i c g}
- Oecetis vijayaditya Schmid, 1995^{i c g}
- Oecetis vikramaditya Schmid, 1995^{i c g}
- Oecetis villosa Kimmins, 1963^{i c g}
- Oecetis virgata Ulmer, 1908^{i c g}
- Oecetis vrindawama Schmid, 1995^{i c g}
- Oecetis vulgata (Marlier, 1956)^{i c g}
- Oecetis walpolica Neboiss, 1982^{i c g}
- Oecetis xaniona Neboiss, 1989^{i c g}
- Oecetis yogechwara Schmid, 1995^{i c g}
- Oecetis yukii Tsuda, 1942^{i c g}

Data sources: i = ITIS, c = Catalogue of Life, g = GBIF, b = Bugguide.net
