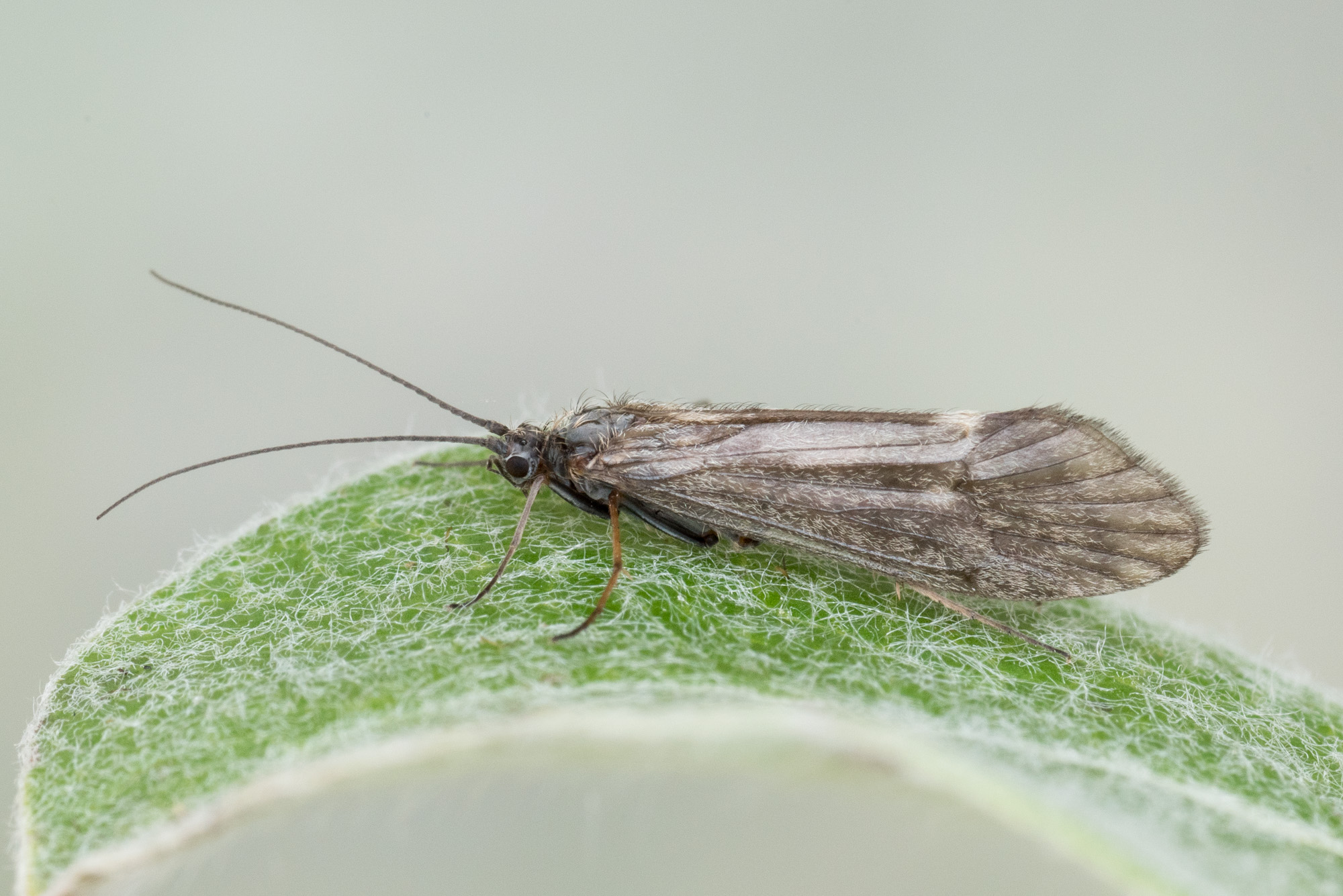

Scientific classification
- Kingdom: Animalia
- Phylum: Arthropoda
- Clade: Pancrustacea
- Class: Insecta
- Order: Trichoptera
- Family: Apataniidae
- Genus: Apatania
- Species: A. zonella

Binomial name
- Apatania zonella (Zetterstedt, 1840)

= Apatania zonella =

Species of caddisfly

Apatania zonella is a species of insect belonging to the family Apataniidae.

It has almost cosmopolitan distribution.
