= Apatania incerta =

Scientific classification
- Domain: Eukaryota
- Kingdom: Animalia
- Phylum: Arthropoda
- Class: Insecta
- Order: Trichoptera
- Family: Apataniidae
- Genus: Apatania
- Species: A. incerta

Binomial name
- Apatania incerta (Banks, 1897)

Synonyms
- Enoicyla incerta Banks, 1897

Species of caddisfly

Apatania incerta is a species of early smoky wing sedge in the family Apataniidae. It is found in North America.
