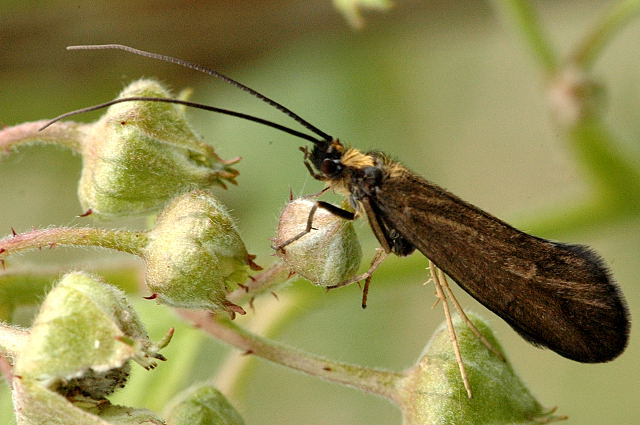
- Sericostoma personatum

Scientific classification
- Domain: Eukaryota
- Kingdom: Animalia
- Phylum: Arthropoda
- Class: Insecta
- Order: Trichoptera
- Suborder: Integripalpia
- Infraorder: Brevitentoria
- Superfamily: Sericostomatoidea

Families
- see text

= Sericostomatoidea =

Superfamily of caddisflies

Sericostomatoidea is a superfamily in the order Trichoptera, the caddisflies.

Families include:

- Anomalopsychidae
- Antipodoeciidae
- Barbarochthonidae
- Beraeidae
- Calocidae
- Chathamiidae
- Conoesucidae
- Helicophidae
- Helicopsychidae – snail-case caddisflies
- Hydrosalpingidae
- Petrothrincidae
- Sericostomatidae
