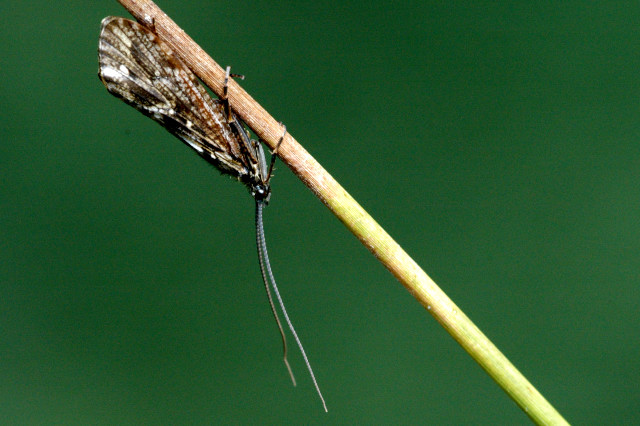
- Phryganea bipunctata

Scientific classification
- Domain: Eukaryota
- Kingdom: Animalia
- Phylum: Arthropoda
- Class: Insecta
- Order: Trichoptera
- Suborder: Integripalpia
- Infraorder: Plenitentoria
- Superfamily: Phryganeoidea; Leach, 1815

Families
- Phryganeidae; Plectrotarsidae; Phryganopsychidae

= Phryganeoidea =

Superfamily of caddisflies

Phryganeoidea, the giant caddisfly superfamily, may be paraphyletic with Limnephiloidea.

== Body ==
Adult body length 14–25 mm (0.55–0.98 in); common species usually >20 mm (0.79 in).

== Identification ==
Adults large (body usually 20 mm (0.79 in) or more); forewings gray, brown, or yellowish-brown, sometimes with specks, patches, or other markings. Specific characters:

- ocelli (simple eyes) present
- no wing hairs clubbed--character shared with some other families (1)
- maxillary palps 4-segmented in males, 5-segmented in females
- front tibia has 2 or more spurs, middle tibia has 4

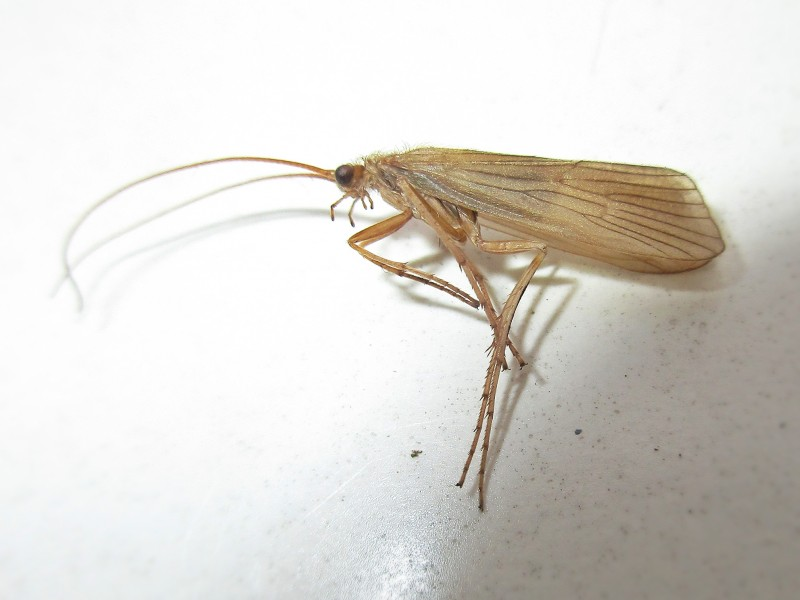
