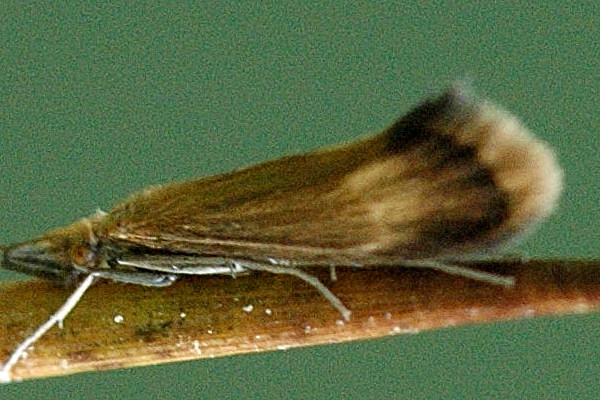
- Leptocerus interruptus

Scientific classification
- Domain: Eukaryota
- Kingdom: Animalia
- Phylum: Arthropoda
- Class: Insecta
- Order: Trichoptera
- Suborder: Integripalpia
- Infraorder: Brevitentoria
- Superfamily: Leptoceroidea

Families
- Atriplectididae; Calamoceratidae; Kokiriidae; Leptoceridae; Limnocentropodidae; Molannidae; Odontoceridae; Philorhethridae

= Leptoceroidea =

Superfamily of caddisflies

Leptoceroidea is a superfamily of caddisflies.
