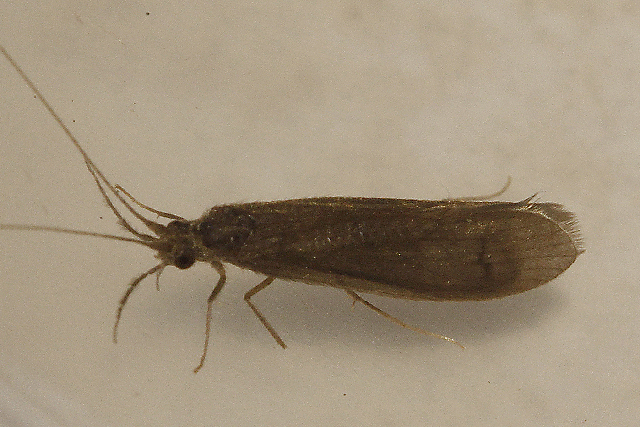

Scientific classification
- Kingdom: Animalia
- Phylum: Arthropoda
- Clade: Pancrustacea
- Class: Insecta
- Order: Trichoptera
- Family: Leptoceridae
- Genus: Oecetis
- Species: O. inconspicua

Binomial name
- Oecetis inconspicua (Walker, 1852)

Synonyms
- Leptocerus inconspicuus Walker, 1852; Oecetina apicalis Banks, 1907; Oecetina flavida Banks, 1899; Oecetina incerta Provancher, 1877; Oecetina inornata Banks, 1907; Oecetina parvula Banks, 1899; Oecetis antillana (Banks, 1938); Oecetis apicalis (Banks, 1907); Oecetis flaveolata (Hagen, 1861); Oecetis flavida (Banks, 1899); Oecetis incerta (Provancher, 1877); Oecetis inornata (Banks, 1907); Oecetis micrans (Hagen, 1861); Oecetis parvula (Banks, 1899); Oecetis sagitta (Hagen, 1861); Setodes flaveolata Hagen, 1861; Setodes micrans Hagen, 1861; Setodes sagitta Hagen, 1861

= Oecetis inconspicua =

Species of caddisfly

Oecetis inconspicua is a species of long-horned caddisfly in the family Leptoceridae. It is found in North America.
