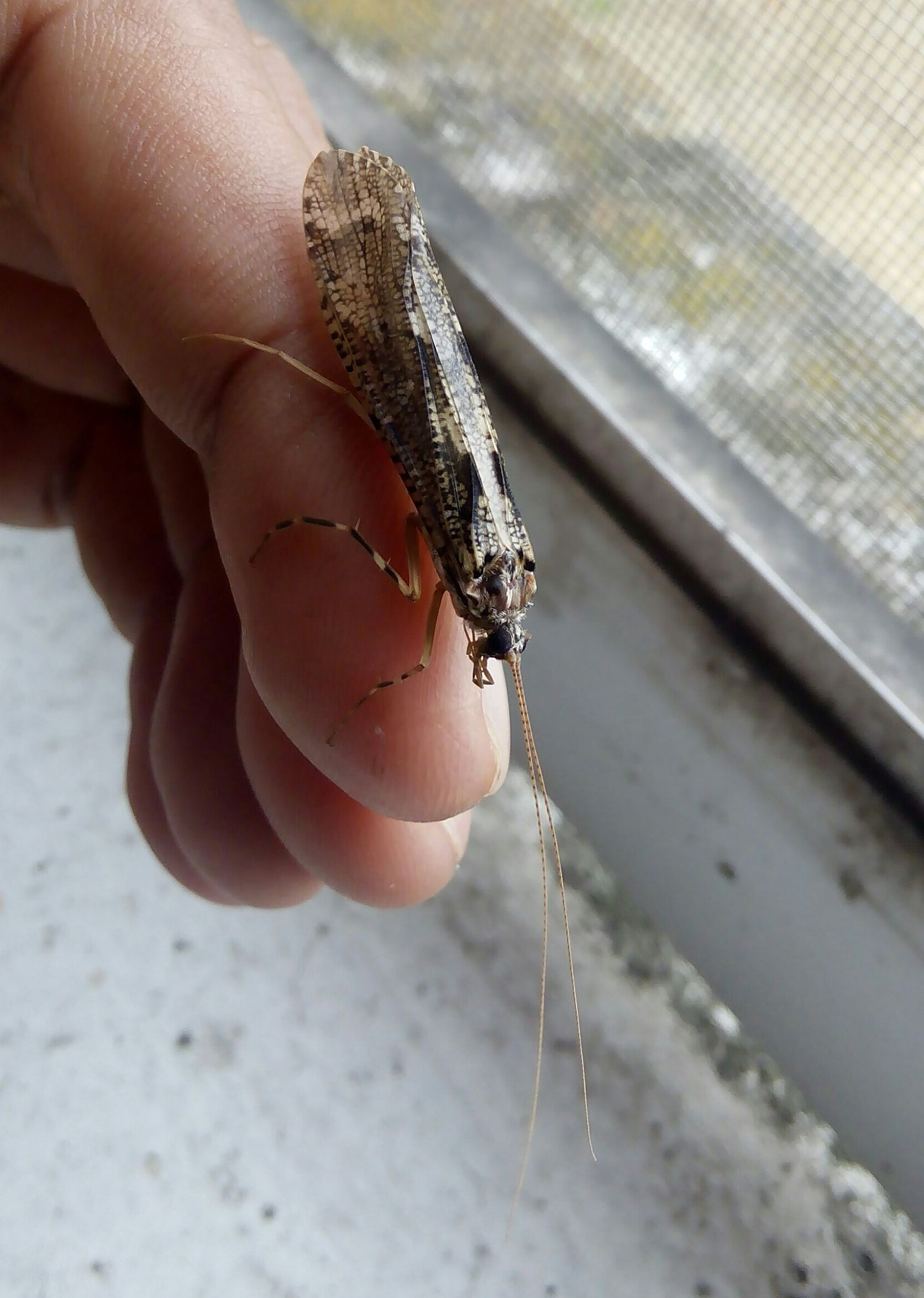
- Adult

Scientific classification
- Kingdom: Animalia
- Phylum: Arthropoda
- Clade: Pancrustacea
- Class: Insecta
- Order: Trichoptera
- Family: Stenopsychidae
- Genus: Stenopsyche
- Species: S. marmorata

Binomial name
- Stenopsyche marmorata Navas, 1920

= Stenopsyche marmorata =

Species of insect

Stenopsyche marmorata is a species of caddisfly found in Japan. The larvae live in fast-flowing streams and are harvested by Japanese fishermen for zazamushi, a traditional dish made from a mixture of aquatic insect larvae cooked in soya sauce and sugar. This species is widely distributed in Japan, Sakhalin (Russia), the Korean Peninsula, northeastern China, and the Russian Primorsky Territory.

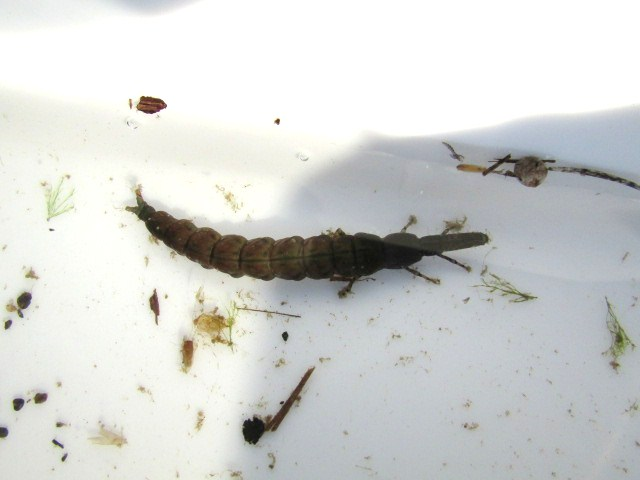
larva

The larvae spin silk nets in streams in which animal and plant matter are trapped and upon which they feed. The larvae grow longer than 2 cm and are the largest caddisflies in the region. In the Primorsky Krai, they constitute 77% of all the trichopteran biomass and 35% of all riverine benthic biomass. The larvae live amid mussels which they use to anchor their filter nets in the Primorsky region. In Japan they are used for monitoring pollutants.

The family Stenopsychidae has three genera Stenopsyche McLachlan, 1866, Pseudostenopsyche Döhler, 1915, and Stenopsychodes Ulmer, 1916 and they are among the largest of net-spinning caddisflies growing to nearly 5 cm. The genus Stenopsyche has more than 90 species mainly found in the eastern Palearctic (a few in the Oriental and African region as well).

In the Tenryu-gawa River Community in Nagano, licenses are given out for their harvest. Zazamushi is predominantly composed of the larvae of Stenopsyche marmorata. They were originally used and eaten locally until around 1956 when they were packaged and sold as a souvenir by the company Kaneman. The aquatic silk has been a subject of study.
