= Plectrotarsidae =

Scientific classification
- Kingdom: Animalia
- Phylum: Arthropoda
- Clade: Pancrustacea
- Class: Insecta
- Order: Trichoptera
- Suborder: Integripalpia
- Infraorder: Plenitentoria
- Superfamily: Phryganeoidea
- Family: Plectrotarsidae; Mosely in Mosely & Kimmins, 1953

Genera
- Liapota; Nanopectrus; Plectrotarsus

Family of caddisflies

Plectrotarsidae is a small Australasian family of insects in the order Trichoptera. The family consists of three genera, with five species in total. Two of the genera are monotypic, while the third genera (Liapota) contains three species.

== History ==
The family was discovered by Mosely in 1953. It originally including the Kokiria genera, which later became its own family.
