= Oecetis cinerascens =

Scientific classification
- Kingdom: Animalia
- Phylum: Arthropoda
- Clade: Pancrustacea
- Class: Insecta
- Order: Trichoptera
- Family: Leptoceridae
- Genus: Oecetis
- Species: O. cinerascens

Binomial name
- Oecetis cinerascens (Hagen, 1861)

Synonyms
- Setodes cinerascens Hagen, 1861

Species of caddisfly

Oecetis cinerascens is a species of long-horned caddisfly in the family Leptoceridae. It is found in North America.
