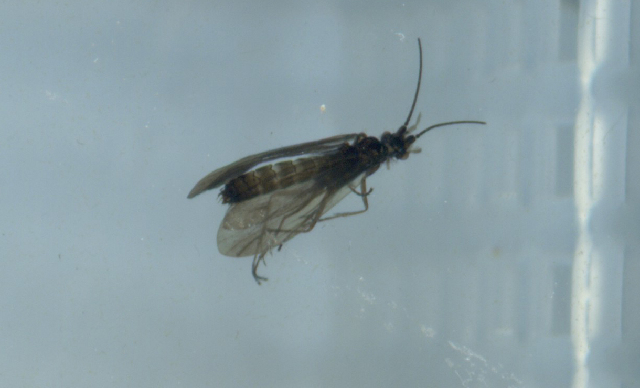
- Beraea dira

Scientific classification
- Kingdom: Animalia
- Phylum: Arthropoda
- Clade: Pancrustacea
- Class: Insecta
- Order: Trichoptera
- Family: Beraeidae
- Genus: Beraea; Stephens, 1833

= Beraea =

Genus of insects

Beraea is a genus of insects in the family Beraeidae.

The genus was described in 1833 by Stephens.

The genus has cosmopolitan distribution.

Species:

- Beraea maurus (Curtis, 1834)
- Beraea pullata (Curtis, 1834)
