= Oecetis osteni =

Scientific classification
- Kingdom: Animalia
- Phylum: Arthropoda
- Clade: Pancrustacea
- Class: Insecta
- Order: Trichoptera
- Family: Leptoceridae
- Genus: Oecetis
- Species: O. osteni

Binomial name
- Oecetis osteni Milne, 1934

Species of caddisfly

Oecetis osteni is a species of long-horned caddisfly in the family Leptoceridae. It is found in North America.
