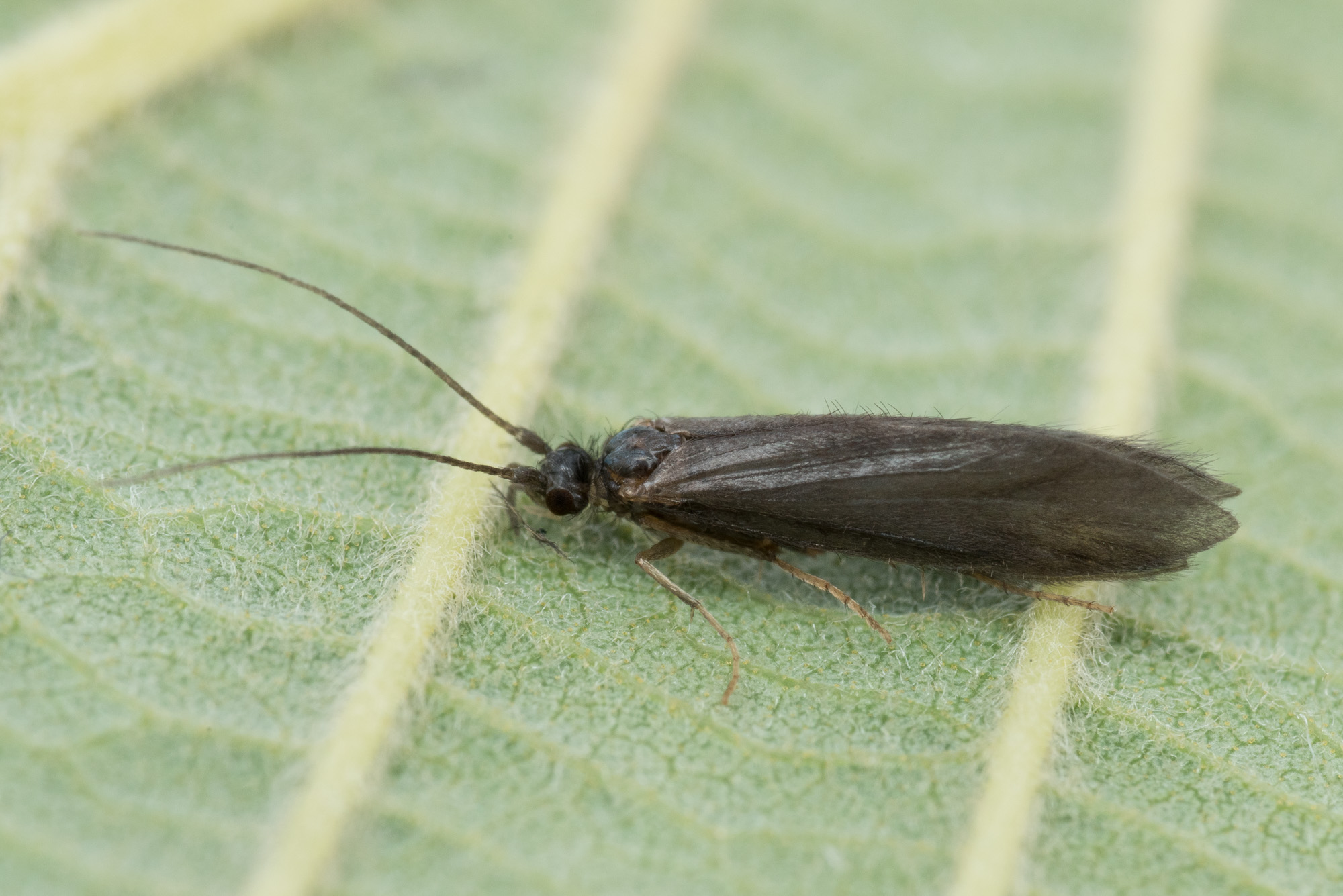
- Beraeodes minutus

Scientific classification
- Kingdom: Animalia
- Phylum: Arthropoda
- Clade: Pancrustacea
- Class: Insecta
- Order: Trichoptera
- Family: Beraeidae
- Genus: Beraeodes; Eaton, 1867

= Beraeodes =

Genus of caddisflies

Beraeodes is a genus of caddisflies belonging to the family Beraeidae.

The genus was first described by Eaton in 1867.

The species of this genus are found in Europe.

Species:

- Beraeodes minutus (Linnaeus, 1761)
