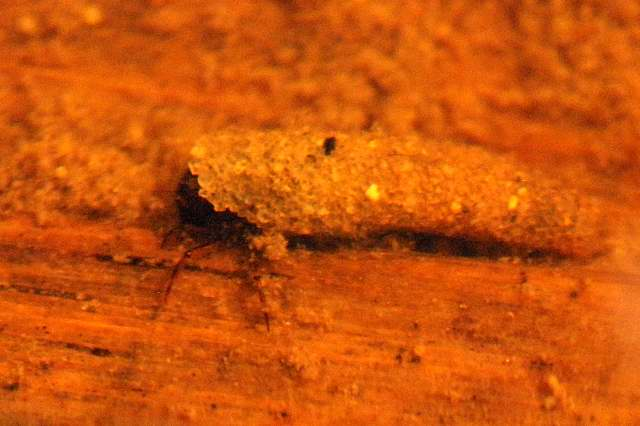

Scientific classification
- Kingdom: Animalia
- Phylum: Arthropoda
- Clade: Pancrustacea
- Class: Insecta
- Order: Trichoptera
- Family: Apataniidae
- Tribe: Apataniini
- Genus: Apatania; Kolenati, 1848

= Apatania =

Genus of insects

Apatania is a genus of caddisflies in the family Apataniidae. There are at least 90 described species in Apatania.

The type species for Apatania is Apatania wallengreni R. McLachlan.

== Species ==
- Apatania aberrans (Martynov, 1933)
- Apatania aison Malicky, 1997
- Apatania alberta Nimmo, 1971
- Apatania amathira Olah, 1994
- Apatania arizona Wiggins, 1973
- Apatania auctumnalis Mey & Malicky, 1993
- Apatania auricula (Forsslund, 1930)
- Apatania avyddhagada Schmid, 1968
- Apatania barri Smith, 1969
- Apatania bhimagada Schmid, 1968
- Apatania bicruris Leng & Yang, 1998
- Apatania biwaensis Nishimoto, 1994
- Apatania blacki Sykora & Weaver, 1978
- Apatania brevis (Mosely, 1936)
- Apatania carpathica Schmid, 1954
- Apatania cedri Malicky & Dia, 1997
- Apatania chasica (Denning, 1954)
- Apatania chokaiensis Kobayashi, 1973
- Apatania cimbrica (Nielsen, 1950)
- Apatania comosa (Denning, 1949)
- Apatania complexa (Martynov, 1935)
- Apatania copiosa (McLachlan, 1875)
- Apatania crassa Schmid, 1953
- Apatania crymophila McLachlan, 1880
- Apatania cypria Tjeder, 1952
- Apatania devisaraspali Schmid, 1968
- Apatania dirghabahu Schmid, 1968
- Apatania doehleri Schmid, 1954
- Apatania eatoniana McLachlan, 1880
- Apatania extenta (Kimmins, 1950)
- Apatania fimbriata (Pictet, 1834)
- Apatania forsslundi Tobias, 1981
- Apatania grandimera Ivanov in Ivanov & Grigorenko, 1991
- Apatania hamardabanica Mey, 1994
- Apatania helvetica Schmid, 1954
- Apatania hirtipes (Curtis, 1835)
- Apatania hispida (Forsslund, 1930)
- Apatania immensa Leng & Yang, 1998
- Apatania incerta (Banks, 1897)
- Apatania insularis Levanidova, 1979
- Apatania intermedia (Nielsen, 1950)
- Apatania irinae Grigorenko in Ivanov & Grigorenko, 1991
- Apatania ishikawai Schmid, 1964
- Apatania isimongolica Leng & Yang, 1998
- Apatania kalariana Schmid, 1961
- Apatania koizumii Iwata, 1927
- Apatania kyotoensis Tsuda, 1939
- Apatania lenica Ivanov in Ivanov & Grigorenko, 1991
- Apatania majuscula McLachlan, 1872
- Apatania malaisei (Kimmins, 1950)
- Apatania maritima Ivanov & Levanidova, 1993
- Apatania meridiana McLachlan, 1880
- Apatania mirabilis Martynov, 1909
- Apatania moharamana (Schmid, 1961)
- Apatania momoyaensis Kobayashi, 1973
- Apatania mongolica Martynov, 1914
- Apatania muliebris McLachlan, 1866
- Apatania nielseni Schmid, 1954
- Apatania nigra (Walker, 1852)
- Apatania nikkoensis Tsuda, 1939
- Apatania olympica Malicky, 1982
- Apatania parvula (Martynov, 1935)
- Apatania praevolans (Morse, 1971)
- Apatania robusta Leng & Yang, 1998
- Apatania rossi (Morse, 1971)
- Apatania sachalinensis Martynov, 1914
- Apatania sarkandensis Ivanov, 1991
- Apatania schmidi Nishimoto, 1988
- Apatania schmidiana Ivanov & Grigorenko, 1991
- Apatania semicircularis Leng & Yang, 1998
- Apatania shirahatai Kobayashi, 1973
- Apatania shoshone Banks, 1924
- Apatania sinensis (Martynov, 1914)
- Apatania sorex (Ross, 1941)
- Apatania spiculata Yang & Wang in Yang, Sun & Wang, 1997
- Apatania stigmatella (Zetterstedt, 1840)
- Apatania stylata Navas, 1916
- Apatania subtilis Martynov, 1909
- Apatania sulciformis Leng & Yang, 1998
- Apatania taiwanensis Kobayashi, 1987
- Apatania tavala (Denning, 1953)
- Apatania tcharvakensis Ivanov, 1991
- Apatania tenuispina Schmid, 1963
- Apatania theischingerorum Malicky, 1981
- Apatania tridigitulus Hwang, 1957
- Apatania trifurca Tian & Sun in Tian, Li & Sun, 1992
- Apatania tsudai Schmid, 1954
- Apatania ulmeri (Schmid, 1950)
- Apatania vepsica Ivanov in Ivanov & Grigorenko, 1991
- Apatania volscorum Moretti, Cianficconi & ? Papagno, 1988
- Apatania wallengreni McLachlan, 1871
- Apatania yenchingensis Ulmer, 1932
- Apatania zonella (Zetterstedt, 1840)
