= Pisuliidae =

Scientific classification
- Kingdom: Animalia
- Phylum: Arthropoda
- Clade: Pancrustacea
- Class: Insecta
- Order: Trichoptera
- Suborder: Integripalpia
- Superfamily: Limnephiloidea
- Family: Pisuliidae; Ross, 1967

Genera
- Pisulia; Silvatares

Family of caddisflies

Pisuliidae is a small family of insects in the order Trichoptera found in tropical Africa and Madagascar. It was considered a family by Ross (1967). It consists of two genera: Pisulia (with six species) and Silvatares (with ten species). Silvatares was originally classified as Calamoceratidae. The family classification was revised by Stoltze (1987).
