= Baissoferidae =

Scientific classification
- Kingdom: Animalia
- Phylum: Arthropoda
- Clade: Pancrustacea
- Class: Insecta
- Order: Trichoptera
- Suborder: Integripalpia
- Family: †Baissoferidae

Genera
- Baissoferus

Extinct family of caddisflies

Baisserferidae is an extinct family in the order Trichoptera (caddis flies). Its fossil dates range from 161 to 112 million years old. It was lacustrine and terrestrial and was found in the Jurassic range of Russia and the Cretaceous range of Mongolia and Russia. It is recognized from other caddis flies with its fore wings in a distinct "M" pattern.
