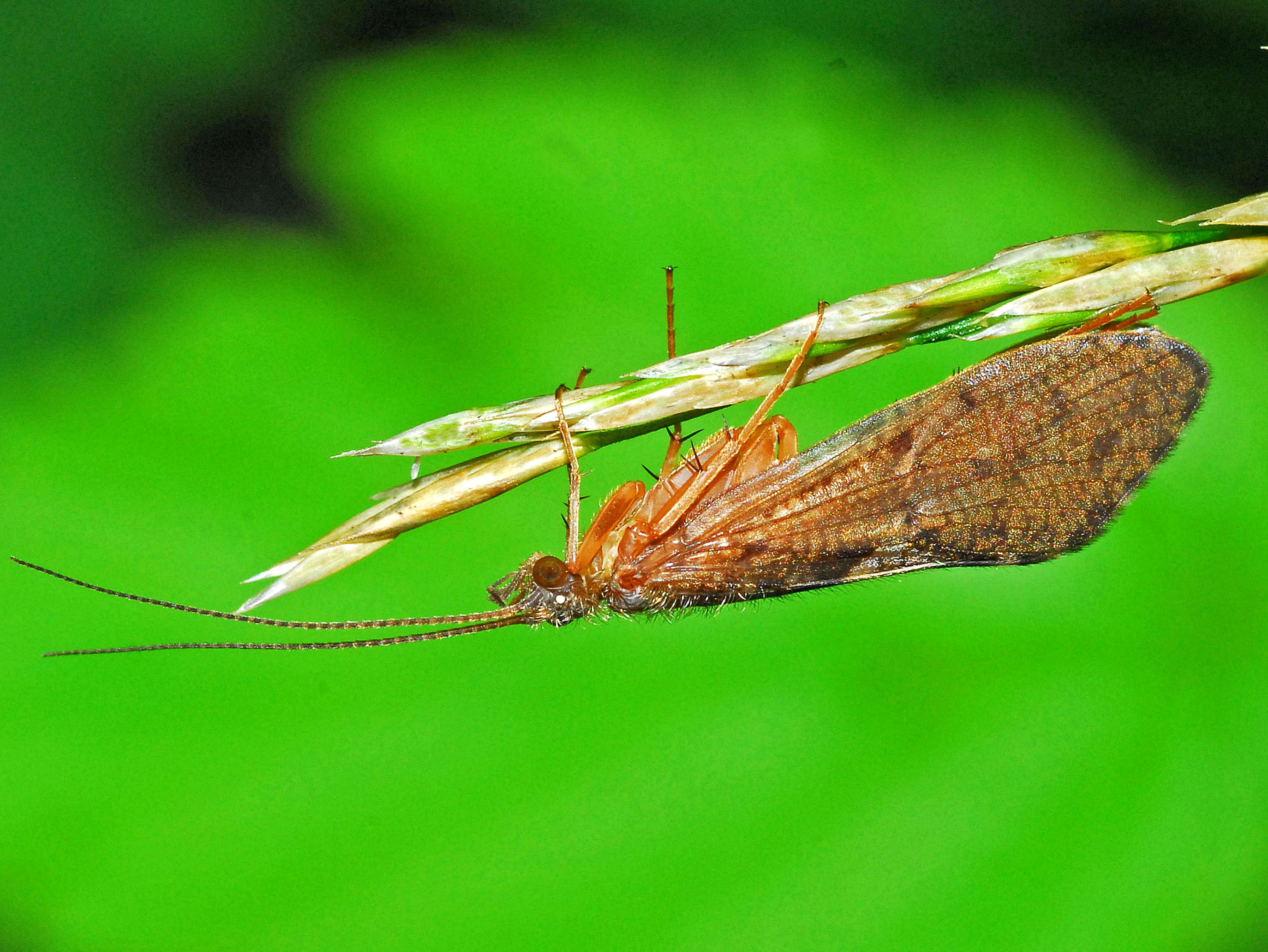
- Rhyacophila species imago

Scientific classification
- Domain: Eukaryota
- Kingdom: Animalia
- Phylum: Arthropoda
- Class: Insecta
- Order: Trichoptera
- Superfamily: Rhyacophiloidea

Families
- Rhyacophilidae; Hydrobiosidae

= Rhyacophiloidea =

Primitive Caddisflies

Superfamily of caddisflies

"Rhyacophiloidea" may also be the name of the entire "Spicipalpia", when these are treated as a superfamily inside the Annulipalpia.

The Rhyacophiloidea are a superfamily in the insect order Trichoptera.
