= Kokiriidae =

Scientific classification
- Kingdom: Animalia
- Phylum: Arthropoda
- Clade: Pancrustacea
- Class: Insecta
- Order: Trichoptera
- Suborder: Integripalpia
- Infraorder: Brevitentoria
- Superfamily: Leptoceroidea
- Family: Kokiriidae; McFarlane, 1964

Genera
- Kokiria; Mecynostomella; Pangullia; Taskiria; Tanjistomella; Taskiropsyche

Family of caddisflies

Kokiriidae is a family of insect in the order Trichoptera. It was discovered in 1964 and is found in Australia, Chile, New Caledonia, and New Zealand. It consists of fifteen species and six genera.

== History ==
It was originally erected in 1964 as the subfamily of Kokiriinae and discovered the species Kokiria miharo, from New Zealand, but was soon reclassified as a family in 1967 by H. H. Ross and added the Chilean species, Rhynchopsyche fusca, to the new family.

Arturs Neboiss described the Australian species Tanjistomella verna and the New Caledonian genus Mecynostomella in 1974. In the same year, he described two other Australian genera, Taskiria and Taskiropsyche. O.S. Flint Jr. considered the species Rhynchopsyche fusca to be a junior synonym of the species Pangullia faziana. K.A. Johanson revised the genera, Mecynostomella, which increased the family size to fifteen species and six genera.

== Larvae ==
The larvae are predatory and live on the small, sandy banks of streams and rivers. The larvae cases are made from sand and are depressed and slightly flanged around the edge of the case.
