= Pedomoecus =

Scientific classification
- Kingdom: Animalia
- Phylum: Arthropoda
- Clade: Pancrustacea
- Class: Insecta
- Order: Trichoptera
- Family: Apataniidae
- Genus: Pedomoecus; Ross, 1947
- Species: P. sierra

Binomial name
- Pedomoecus sierra Ross, 1947

Genus of caddisflies

Pedomoecus is a genus of early smoky wing sedges in the family Apataniidae. There is one described species in Pedomoecus, P. sierra.
