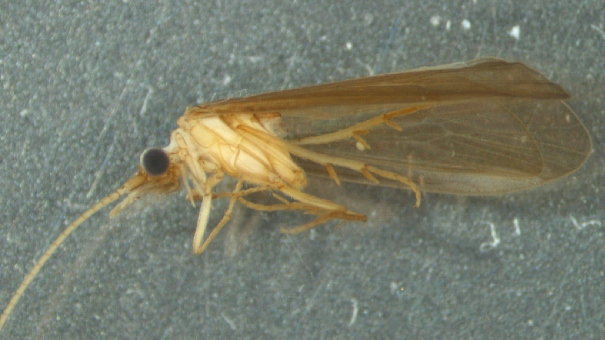
- Tasiagma ciliata

Scientific classification
- Kingdom: Animalia
- Phylum: Arthropoda
- Clade: Pancrustacea
- Class: Insecta
- Order: Trichoptera
- Suborder: Integripalpia
- Superfamily: Tasimioidea; Riek, 1968
- Family: Tasimiidae; Riek, 1968

Genera
- See text

= Tasimiidae =

Family of caddisflies

The Tasimiidae is a family of Trichoptera, erected in 1968 (Riek). The family is found in Australia and Chile. The genera Tricovespula was originally placed in the Lepidostomatidae, but it was placed in the Tasmiidae by Flint (1969). Tasimiidae is the only family in the superfamily Tasimioidea.

== Characteristics ==
All members are identified by the following characteristics:

- head rounded, eyes bulging
- head and pronotum sclerotised
- pronotum with anterolateral corners rounded or acute
- posterior flange broad or narrow
- mesonotum with pair of large sclerites
- metanotum with 2 pairs of small sclerites
- abdomen with strongly developed lateral fringe of setae
- abdominal gills present
- Total length: 5 to 6 mm
- Case: Dorsoventrally flattened made of small stones, with ventral opening

== Genera ==
- Charadropsyche Chile
  - Charadropsyche penicillata
- Trichovespula Chile
  - Trichovespula macrocera
- Tasimia Australia
  - Tasimia atra
  - Tasimia denticulata
  - Tasimia drepana
  - Tasimia natasia
  - Tasimia palpata
- Tasiagma Australia
  - Tasiagma ciliata
