= Kalophryganeidae =

Scientific classification
- Kingdom: Animalia
- Phylum: Arthropoda
- Clade: Pancrustacea
- Class: Insecta
- Order: Trichoptera
- Family: †Kalophryganeidae

Genera
- Kalophryganea

Extinct family of caddisflies

Kalophryganeidae is an extinct family in the order Trichoptera. It was described by Hermann Haupt in 1956. It consists of one species in one genus, Kalophrygamea.
