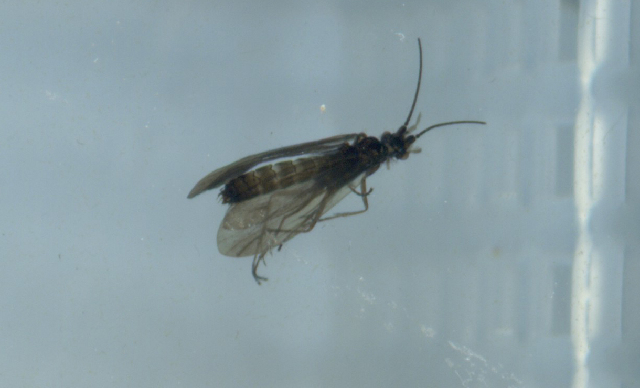
- Beraea dira

Scientific classification
- Kingdom: Animalia
- Phylum: Arthropoda
- Clade: Pancrustacea
- Class: Insecta
- Order: Trichoptera
- Superfamily: Sericostomatoidea
- Family: Beraeidae

= Beraeidae =

Family of insects

Beraeidae is a family of caddisflies belonging to the order Trichoptera.

Genera:

- Beraea Stephens, 1833
- Beraeamyia Mosely, 1930
- Beraeodes Eaton, 1867
- Beraeodina Mosely, 1931
- Bereodes Eaton, 1867
- Ernodes Wallengren, 1891
- Nippoberaea Botosaneanu, Nozaki & Kagaya, 1995
- Notoernodes Andersen & Kjaerandsen, 1997
- Thya Curtis, 1834
