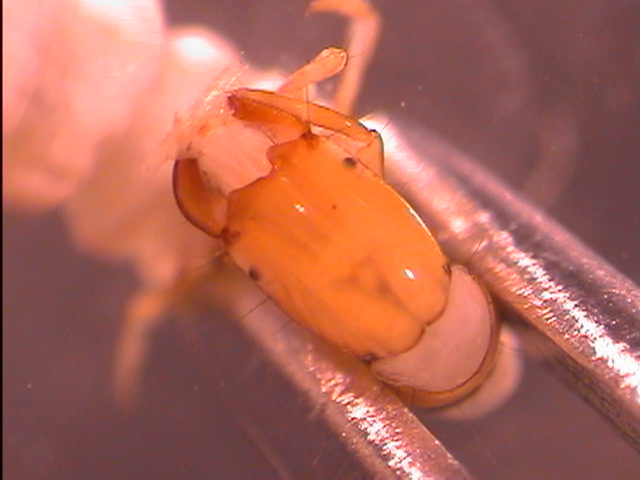

Scientific classification
- Kingdom: Animalia
- Phylum: Arthropoda
- Clade: Pancrustacea
- Class: Insecta
- Order: Trichoptera
- Suborder: Annulipalpia
- Superfamily: Philopotamoidea; Stephens, 1829

Families
- Philopotamidae; Stenopsychidae

= Philopotamoidea =

Superfamily of caddisflies

Philopotamoidea is a paraphyletic superfamily of caddisflies, containing two families: the Philopotamidae, and the Stenopsychidae.
