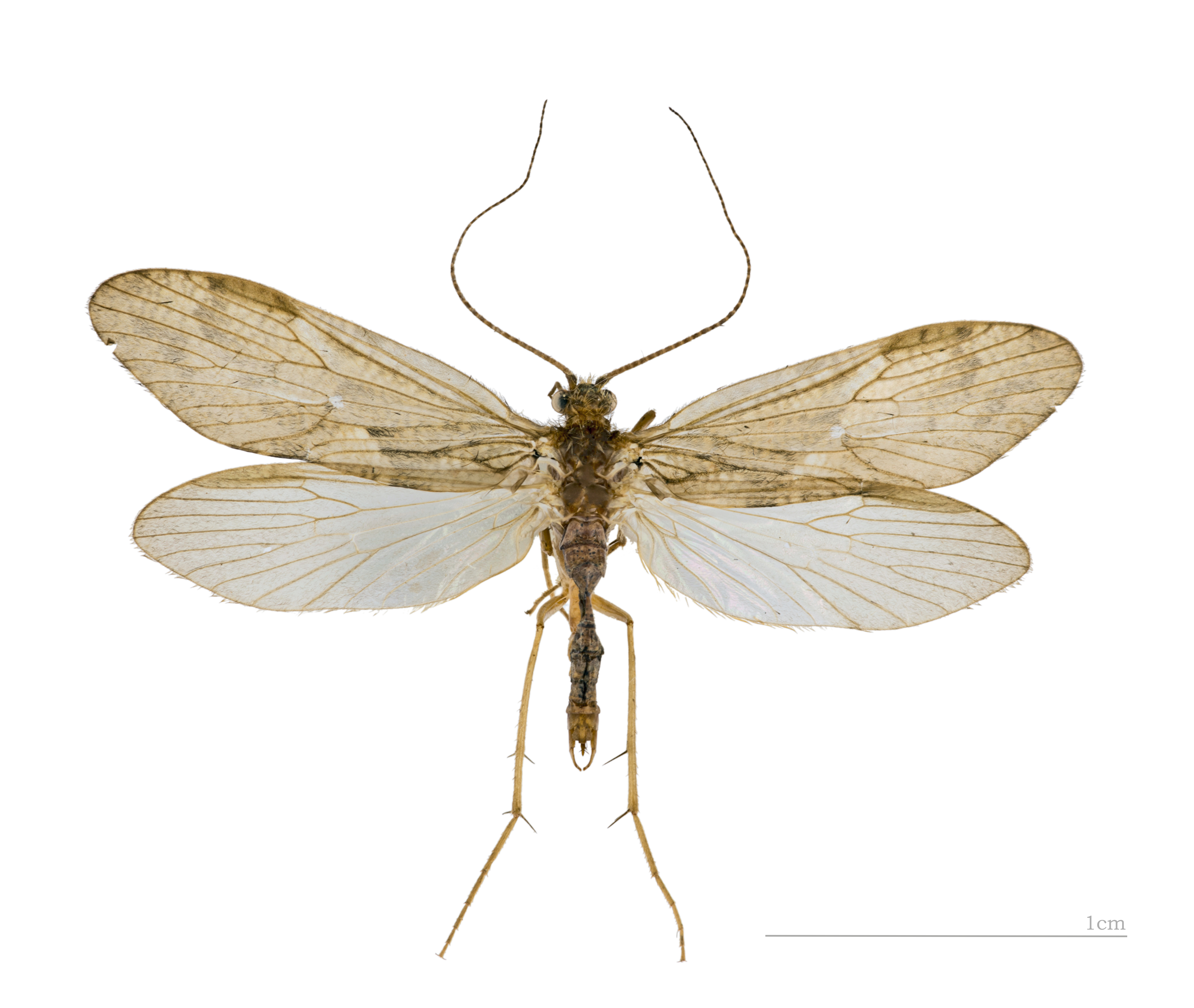
- Rhyacophila dorsalis, a member of Spicipalpia

Scientific classification
- Kingdom: Animalia
- Phylum: Arthropoda
- Clade: Pancrustacea
- Class: Insecta
- Order: Trichoptera
- Suborder: Spicipalpia

Superfamilies
- Rhyacophiloidea; Hydroptiloidea

= Spicipalpia =

Suborder of caddisflies

The Spicipalpia are a suborder of Trichoptera, the caddisflies. The four families included in this suborder all have the character of pointed maxillary palps in the adults. The larvae of the different families have varying lifestyles, from free-living to case-making, but all construct cases in their final larval instar for pupation or at an earlier instar as a precocial pupation behavior. Although recognized under some phylogenies, molecular analysis has shown this group is likely paraphyletic.
