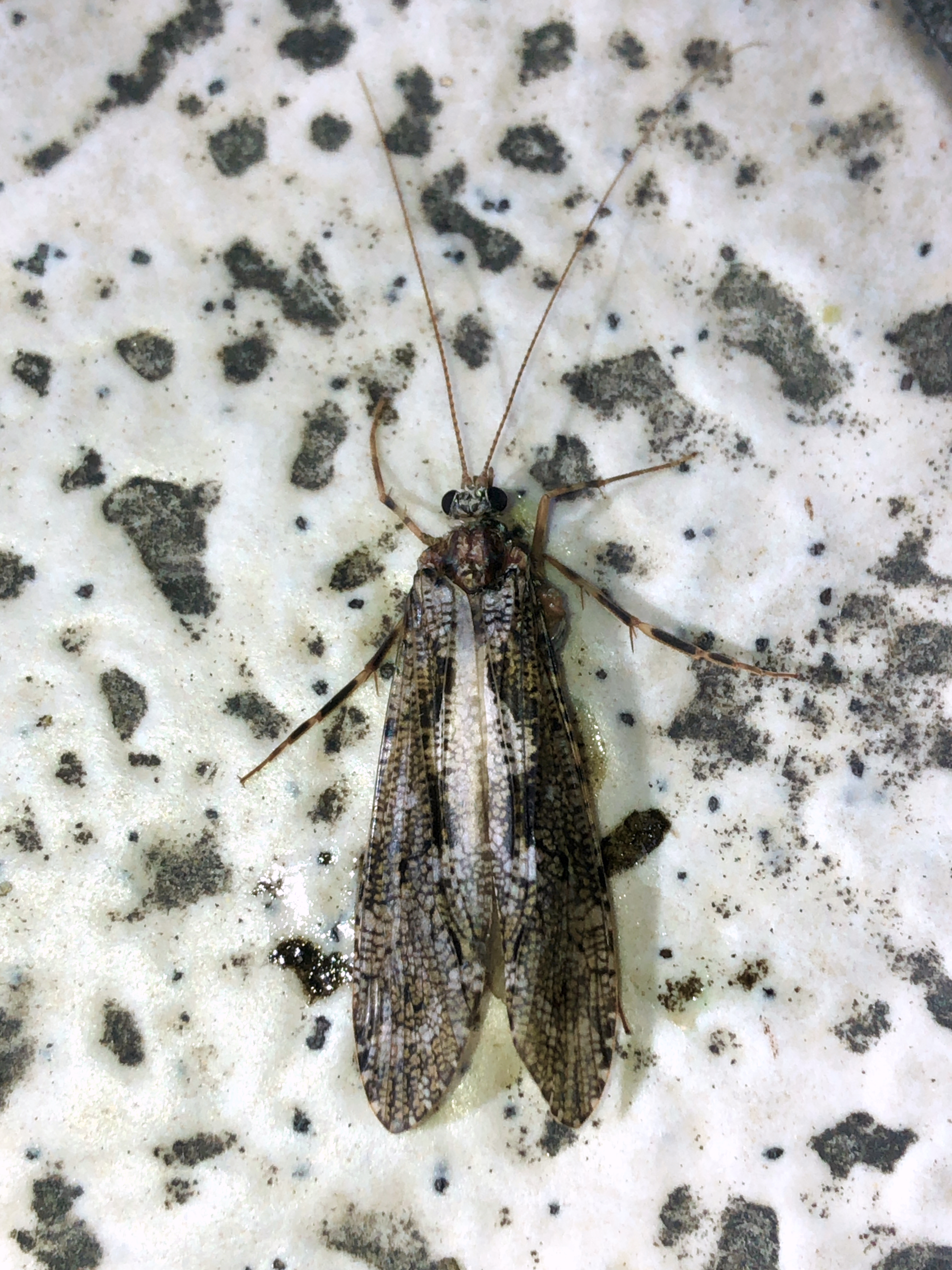
- Stenopsyche marmorata

Scientific classification
- Kingdom: Animalia
- Phylum: Arthropoda
- Clade: Pancrustacea
- Class: Insecta
- Order: Trichoptera
- Suborder: Annulipalpia
- Superfamily: Philopotamoidea
- Family: Stenopsychidae; Martynov, 1924

Genera
- Pseudostenopsyche; Stenopsyche; Stenopsychodes

= Stenopsychidae =

Family of caddisflies

The Stenopsychidae are a family of medium to large caddisflies, some of which are noted for their black and gold wing patterns. The family contains three genera and some 70 species, which can be found in the Ethiopian, Palaearctic, Oriental, and Australian regions.
