= Hubert Duprat =

French artist

Hubert Duprat is a French artist known for his unusual work, an artistic intersection between caddisfly larvae and gold, opal, turquoise and other precious stones.

Caddisfly larvae live in fresh water and naturally construct elaborate protective tubes for themselves from materials found in their environment. Under natural conditions they use the objects found in their stream bed homes such as pieces of wood, fragments of fish bone or crustacean shell, grains of sand, plant debris and small stones. The tubes serve various purposes; the stones are used to increase traction in fast-moving streams, they serve as disguise for the soft-bodied insect and the spiky bits make the tube and thus, the fly larva, more difficult for predators to swallow.

Duprat, born in 1957, began his work with caddisfly larvae in the early 1980s. He collects the larvae from their normal environments and he takes them to his studio. There he gently removes their own natural cases and puts the larvae in tanks filled with his own materials, from which they begin to build their new protective sheaths. When he began the project, he only provided the caddis larvae with gold flakes. Since then, they have enjoyed various semi-precious and precious stones, including turquoise, coral and lapis lazuli, as well as sapphires, pearls, rubies, and diamonds.

== Works ==
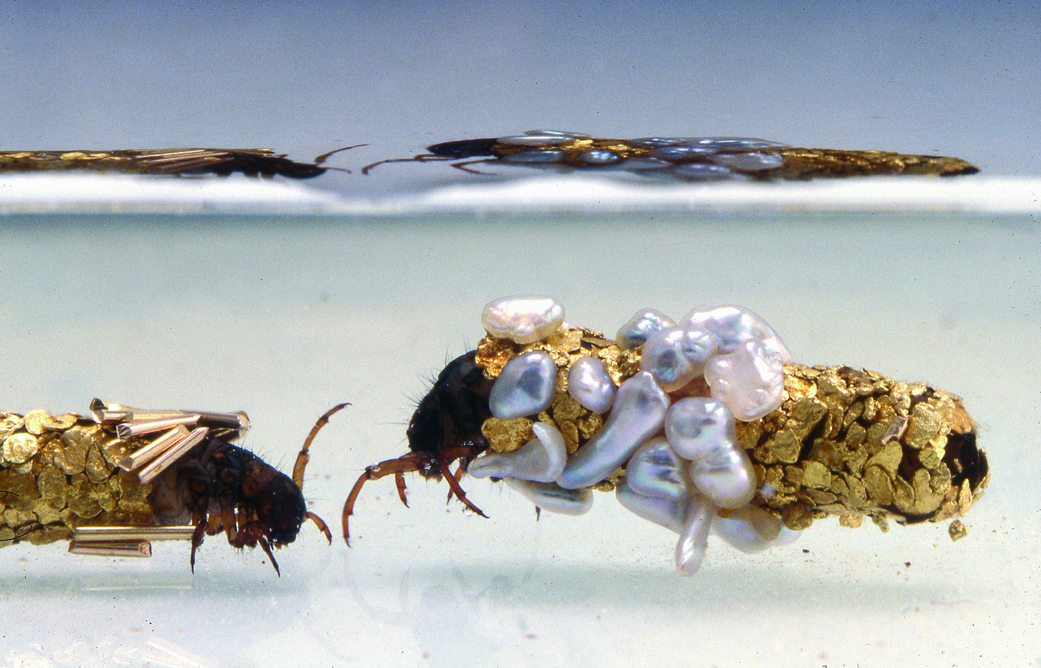

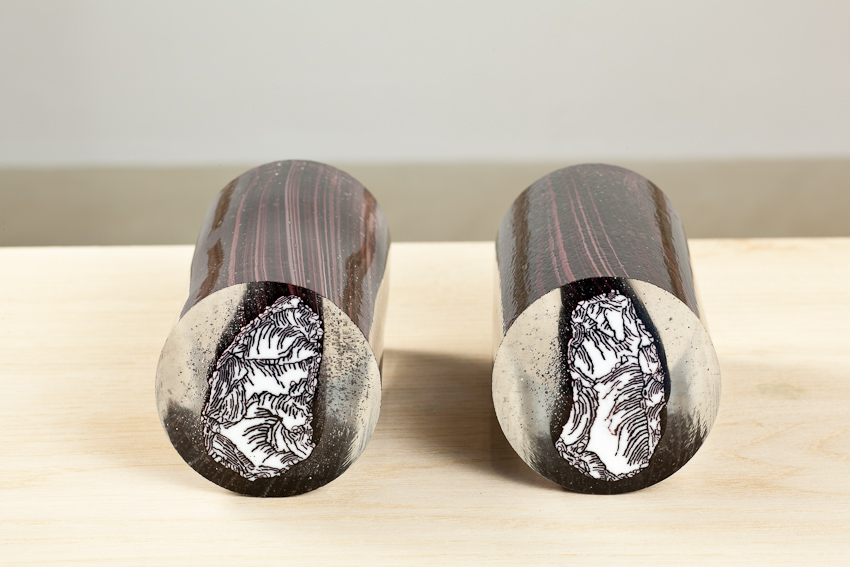

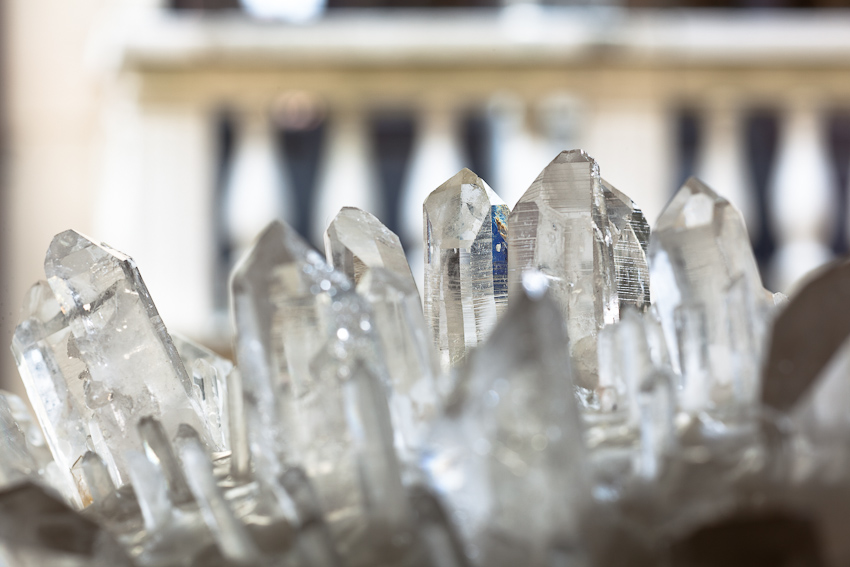

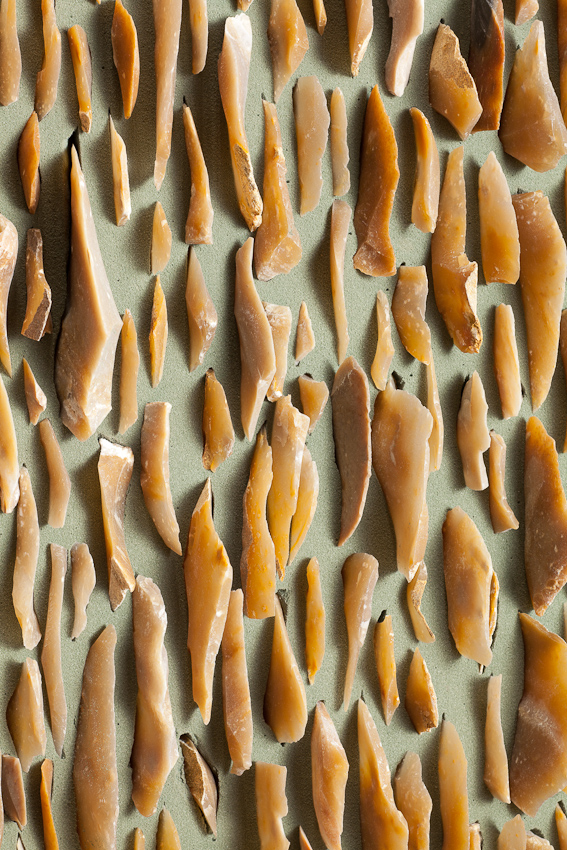
