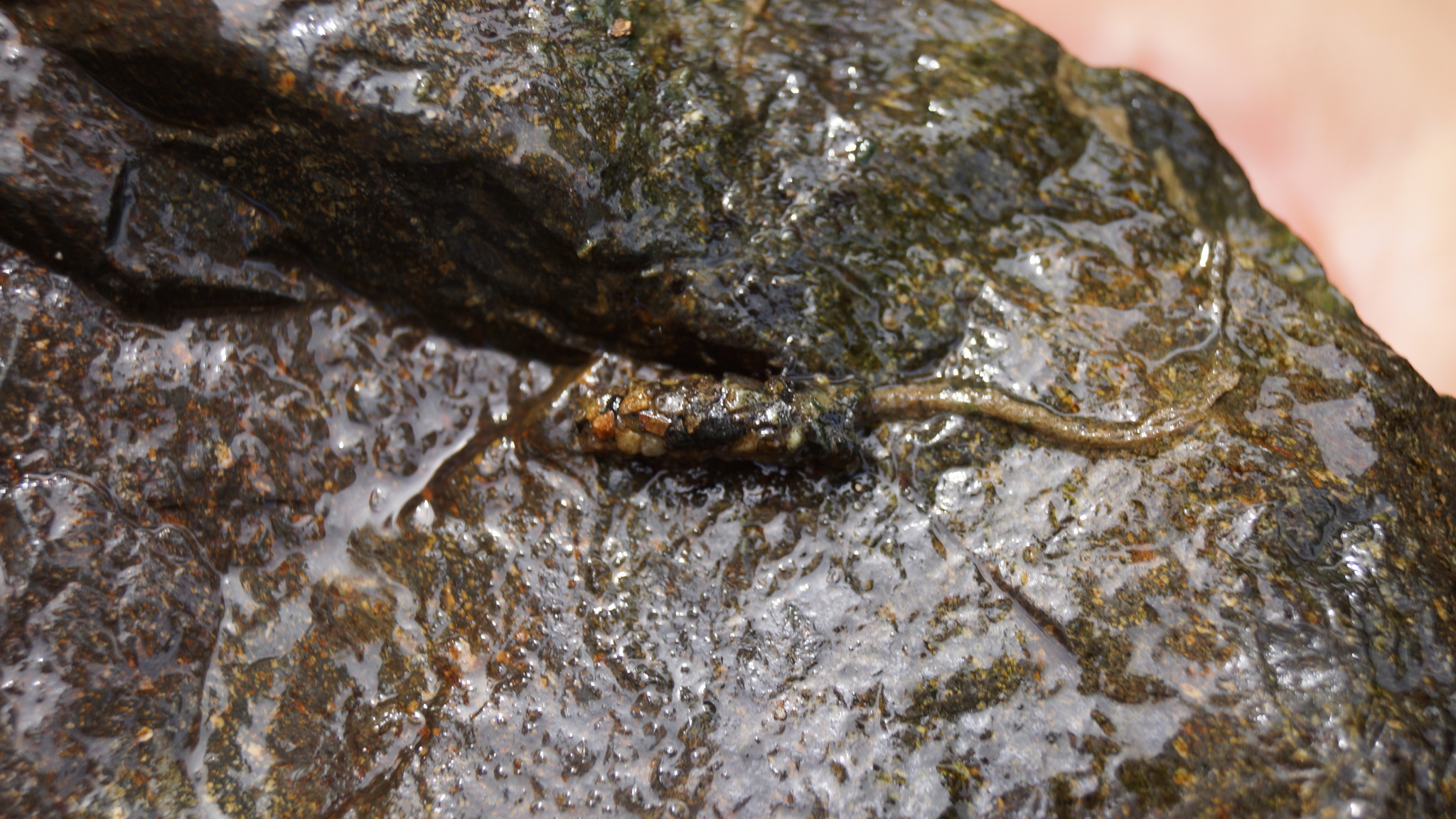
- Larva and case

Scientific classification
- Kingdom: Animalia
- Phylum: Arthropoda
- Clade: Pancrustacea
- Class: Insecta
- Order: Trichoptera
- Family: Anomalopsychidae; Flint, 1981

= Anomalopsychidae =

Family of insects

Anomalopsychidae is a family of caddisflies belonging to the order Trichoptera.

Genera:

- Anomalopsyche Flint, 1967
- Contulma Flint, 1969
