= Antipodoecia =

Scientific classification
- Kingdom: Animalia
- Phylum: Arthropoda
- Clade: Pancrustacea
- Class: Insecta
- Order: Trichoptera
- Family: Antipodoeciidae; Ross, 1967
- Genus: Antipodoecia; Mosely, 1934
- Species: A. turneri

Binomial name
- Antipodoecia turneri Mosely, 1934

Genus of insects

Antipodoecia is a monotypic genus of caddisflies belonging to the monotypic family Antipodoeciidae. The only species is Antipodoecia turneri.

The species is found in Australia.
