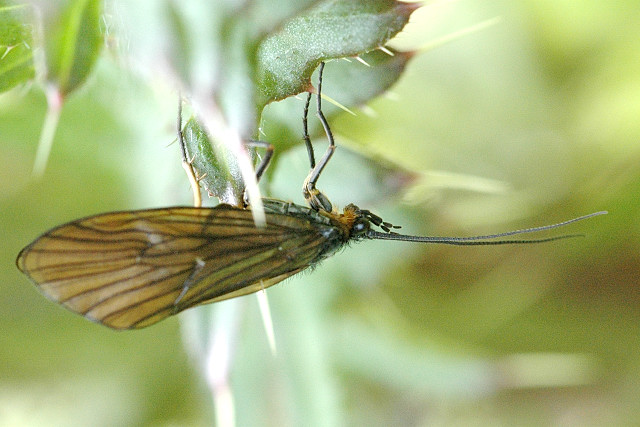
- Notidobia ciliaris

Scientific classification
- Domain: Eukaryota
- Kingdom: Animalia
- Phylum: Arthropoda
- Class: Insecta
- Order: Trichoptera
- Suborder: Integripalpia
- Superfamily: Limnephiloidea; Kolenati, 1848

Families
- Apataniidae; Brachycentridae; Goeridae; Lepidostomatidae; Limnephilidae; Oeconescidae; Pisuliidae; Rossianidae; Uenoidae

= Limnephiloidea =

Superfamily of caddisflies

Limnephiloidea is a superfamily of Trichoptera caddisflies.
