= Atriplectididae =

Scientific classification
- Kingdom: Animalia
- Phylum: Arthropoda
- Clade: Pancrustacea
- Class: Insecta
- Order: Trichoptera
- Family: Atriplectididae; Neboiss, 1977

Family of insects

Atriplectididae is a family of caddisflies belonging to the order Trichoptera.

Genera:

- Atriplectides Mosely, 1936
- Hughscottiella Ulmer, 1910
- Leptodermatopteryx Ulmer, 1910
- Neoatriplectides Holzenthal, 1997
