= Apataniidae =

Scientific classification
- Kingdom: Animalia
- Phylum: Arthropoda
- Clade: Pancrustacea
- Class: Insecta
- Order: Trichoptera
- Superfamily: Limnephiloidea
- Family: Apataniidae; Wallengren, 1886

Family of caddisflies

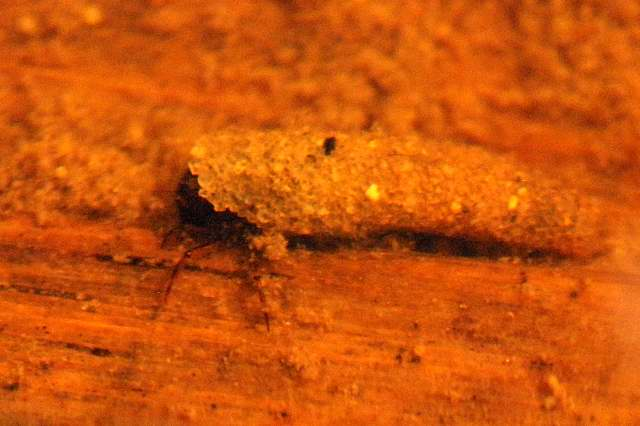
Apatania muliebris

Apataniidae is a family of early smoky wing sedges in the order Trichoptera. There are about 18 genera and at least 180 described species in Apataniidae.

The type genus for Apataniidae is Apatania F. Kolenati, 1848.

== Genera ==
- Allomyia Banks, 1916
- Apatania Kolenati, 1848
- Apataniana Mosely, 1936
- Apatidelia Mosely, 1942
- Baicalina Martynov, 1914
- Baicalinella Martynov, 1924
- Baicaloides Martynov, 1924
- Manophylax Wiggins, 1973
- Moropsyche Banks, 1906
- Moselyana Denning, 1949
- Notania Mosely in Kimmins, 1950
- Pedomoecus Ross, 1947
- Proradema Mey, 1993
- Protobaicalina Ivanov & Menshutkina, 1996
- Pseudoradema Schmid, 1955
- Radema McLachlan, 1872
- Talgara Mey, 1991
- Thamastes Hagen, 1858
