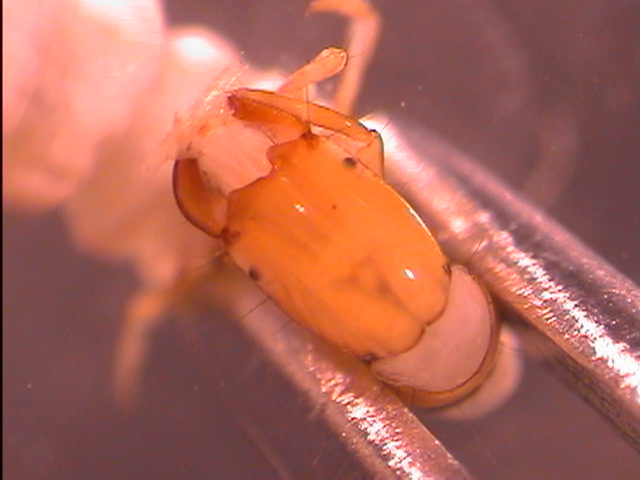
- Philopotamidae Notch.jpg Hydropsychoidea; Philopotamoidea

Scientific classification
- Kingdom: Animalia
- Phylum: Arthropoda
- Clade: Pancrustacea
- Class: Insecta
- Order: Trichoptera
- Suborder: Annulipalpia

= Annulipalpia =

Suborder of caddisflies

The Annulipalpia, also known as the "fixed-retreat makers", are a suborder of Trichoptera, the caddisflies. The name of the suborder refers to the flexible terminal segment of the adult maxillary palps, which often has many tiny rings.

The larvae construct fixed retreats in freshwater aquatic environments in which they remain stationary, waiting for food to come to them. Members of the Psychomyiidae, Ecnomidae and Xiphocentronidae families construct simple tubes of sand and other particles held together by silk and anchored to the bottom, and feed on the accumulations of silt formed when suspended material is deposited on the substrate. Some of the families are unique in spinning silken nets for filter feeding.
