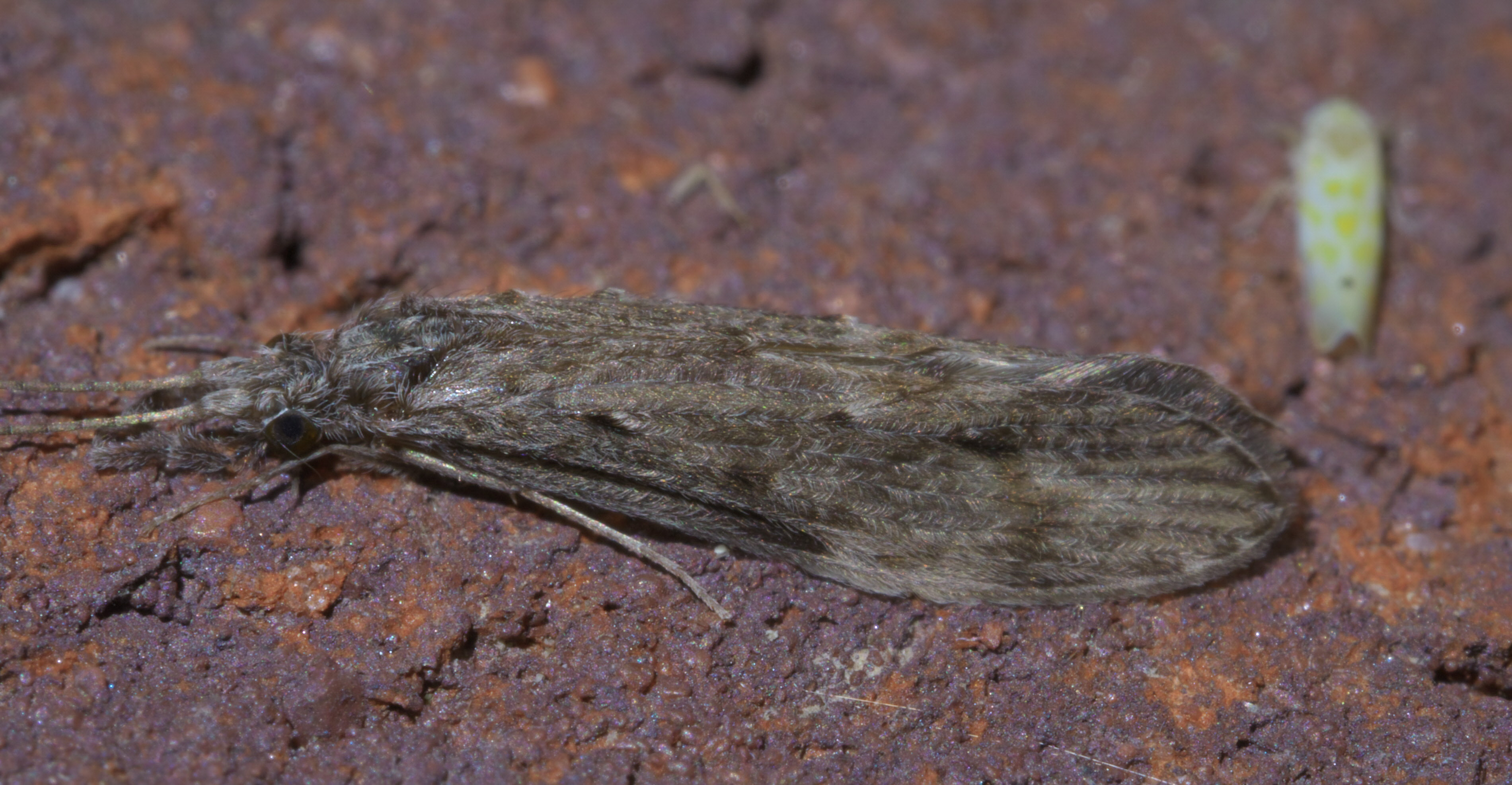

Scientific classification
- Kingdom: Animalia
- Phylum: Arthropoda
- Clade: Pancrustacea
- Class: Insecta
- Order: Trichoptera
- Family: Leptoceridae
- Genus: Oecetis; McLachlan, 1877

Diversity
- at least 410 species

Synonyms
- Oecetina Banks, 1899

= Oecetis =

Genus of caddisflies

Oecetis is a genus of long-horned caddisflies in the family Leptoceridae. There are at least 450 described species in Oecetis.

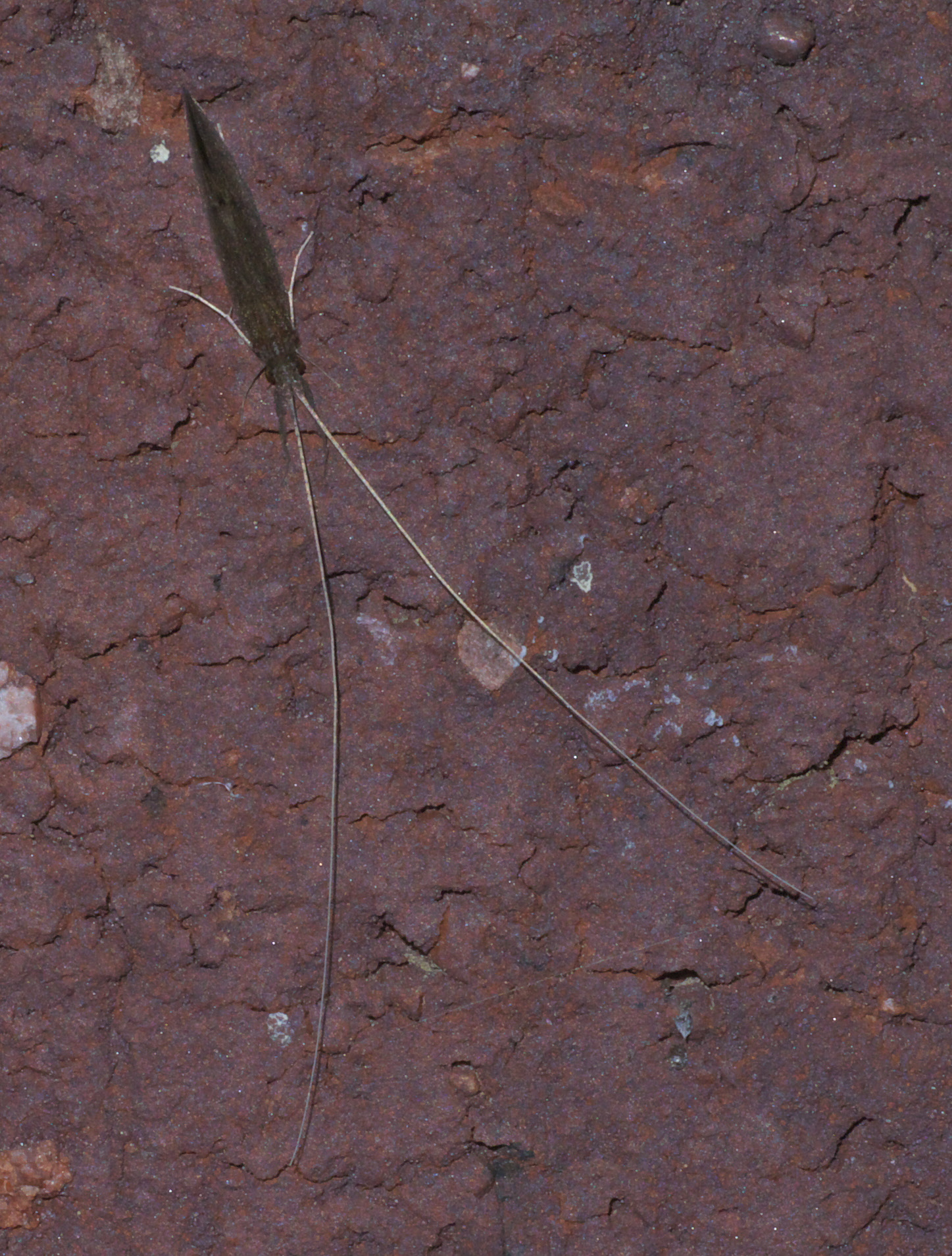

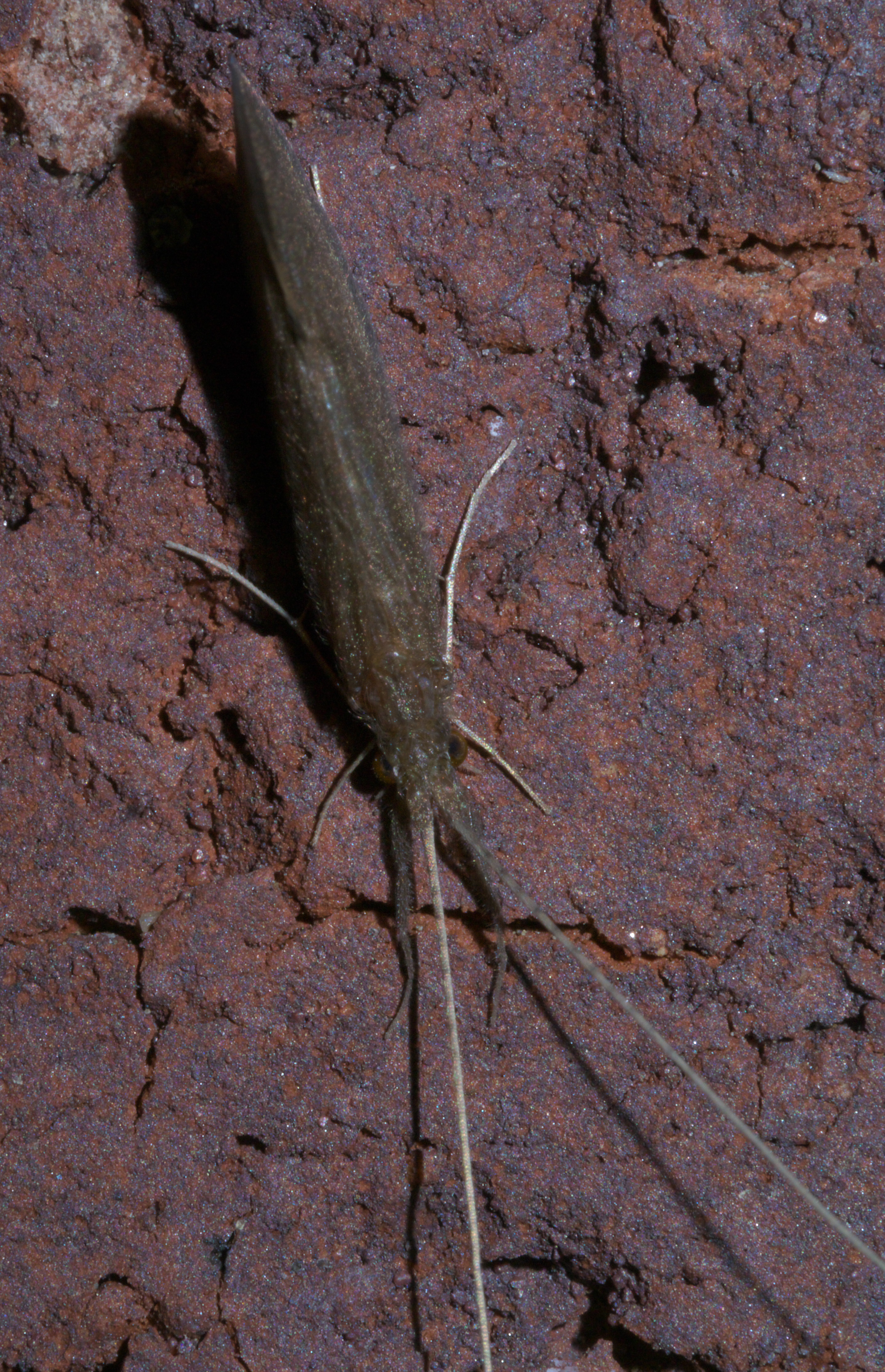

== Larvae ==
Oecetis larvae live at the bottom of both lakes and streams.

== See also ==
- List of Oecetis species
