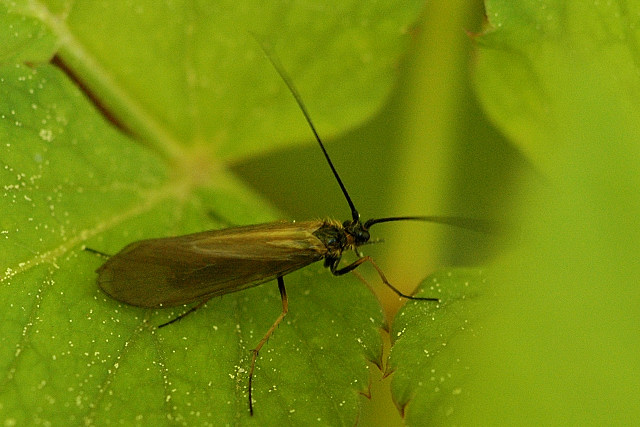
- Limnephilus auricula

Scientific classification
- Domain: Eukaryota
- Kingdom: Animalia
- Phylum: Arthropoda
- Class: Insecta
- Order: Trichoptera
- Suborder: Integripalpia

Superfamilies
- Leptoceroidea; Limnephiloidea; Sericostomatoidea; Phryganeoidea; Tasimioidea

= Integripalpia =

Tube case caddisflies

Suborder of caddisflies

The Integripalpia are a suborder of Trichoptera, the caddisflies. The name refers to the unringed nature of maxillary palp's terminal segment in the adults. Integripalpian larvae construct portable cases out of debris during the first larval instar, which are enlarged through subsequent instars. These cases are often very specific in construction at both the family and genus level.
