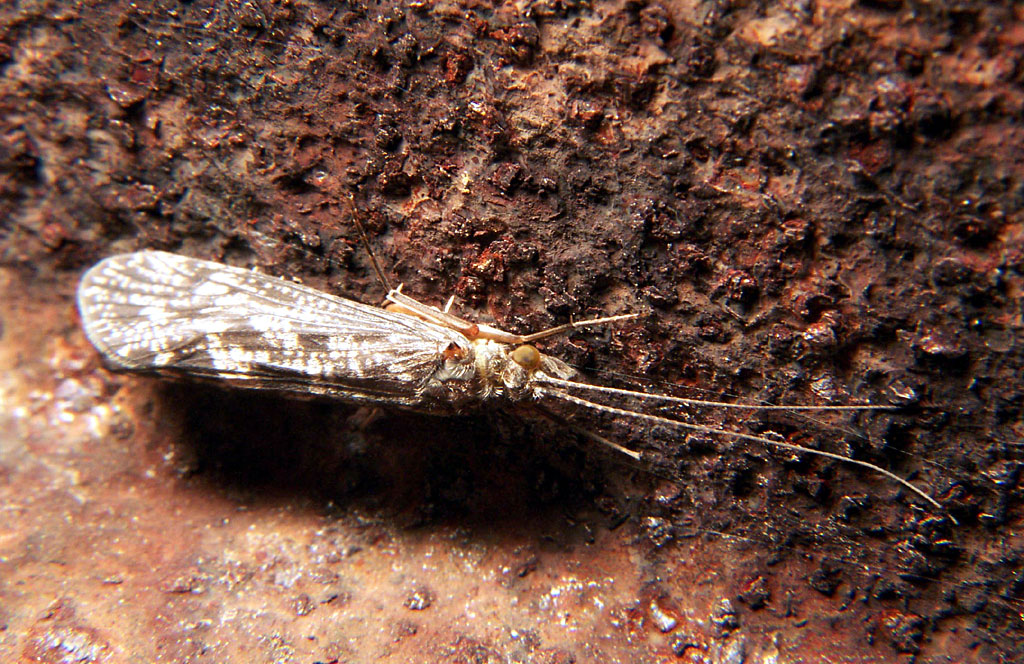

Scientific classification
- Kingdom: Animalia
- Phylum: Arthropoda
- Clade: Pancrustacea
- Class: Insecta
- Clade: Amphiesmenoptera
- Order: Trichoptera; Kirby, 1813

Superfamilies
- Annulipalpia; Hydropsychoidea; Philopotamoidea; Integripalpia; Leptoceroidea; Limnephiloidea; Phryganeoidea; Sericostomatoidea; Tasimioidea; Spicipalpia; Hydroptiloidea; Rhyacophiloidea

= Caddisfly =

Caddisflies Temporal range: Triassic–Recent

Order of insects

The caddisflies (order Trichoptera) are a group of insects with aquatic larvae and terrestrial adults. There are approximately 14,500 described species, most of which can be divided into the suborders Integripalpia and Annulipalpia on the basis of the adult mouthparts. Integripalpian larvae construct a portable casing to protect themselves as they move around looking for food, while annulipalpian larvae make themselves a fixed retreat in which they remain, waiting for food to come to them. The affinities of the small third suborder Spicipalpia are unclear, and molecular analysis suggests it may not be monophyletic. Also called sedge-flies or rail-flies, the adults are small moth-like insects with two pairs of hairy membranous wings. They are closely related to the Lepidoptera (moths and butterflies) which have scales on their wings; the two orders together form the superorder Amphiesmenoptera.

The aquatic larvae are found in a wide variety of habitats such as streams, rivers, lakes, ponds, spring seeps and temporary waters (vernal pools), and even the ocean. The larvae of many species use silk to make protective cases, which are often strengthened with gravel, sand, twigs, bitten-off pieces of plants, or other debris. The larvae exhibit various feeding strategies, with different species being predators, leaf shredders, algal grazers, or collectors of particles from the water column and benthos. Most adults have short lives during which they do not feed.

In fly fishing, artificial flies called dry flies are tied to imitate adults, while larvae and pupae are imitated with artificial flies called wet flies or nymphs. It is also possible to use them as bait, though this is not as common as artificial flies and is known as bait fishing. Common and widespread genera such as Helicopsyche and Hydropsyche are important in the sport, where caddisflies are known as "sedges". Caddisflies are useful as bioindicators, as they are sensitive to water pollution and are large enough to be assessed in the field. In art, the French artist Hubert Duprat has created works by providing caddis larvae with small grains of gold and precious stones for them to build into decorative cases.

== Etymology ==
The name of the order "Trichoptera" derives from the Greek: θρίξ (thrix, "hair"), genitive trichos + πτερόν (pteron, "wing"), and refers to the fact that the wings of these insects are bristly. The origin of the word "caddis" is unclear, but it dates back to at least as far as Izaak Walton's 1653 book The Compleat Angler, where "cod-worms or caddis" were mentioned as being used as bait. The term cadyss was being used in the fifteenth century for silk or cotton cloth, and "cadice-men" were itinerant vendors of such materials, but a connection between these words and the insects has not been established.

== Evolution and phylogeny ==
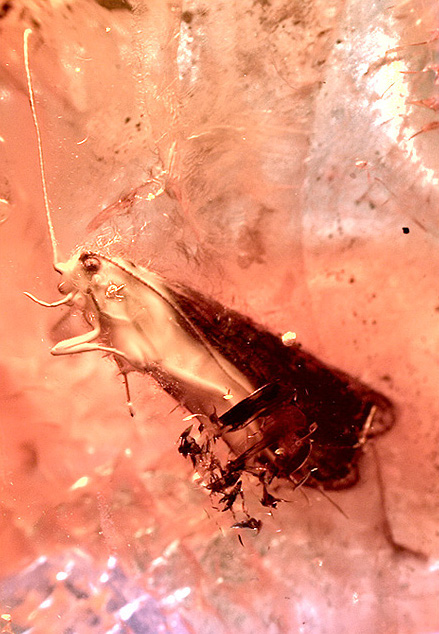
Eocene fossil in Baltic amber, Lithuania (44mya)

=== Fossil history ===
Fossil caddisflies have been found in rocks dating back to the Triassic. The largest numbers of fossilised remains are those of larval cases, which are made of durable materials that preserve well. Body fossils of caddisflies are extremely rare, the oldest being from the Early and Middle Triassic, some 230 million years ago, and wings are another source of fossils. The evolution of the group to one with fully aquatic larvae seems to have taken place sometime during the Triassic. The finding of fossils resembling caddisfly larval cases in marine deposits in Brazil may push back the origins of the order to the Early Permian period.

=== Evolution ===
Nearly all adult caddisflies are terrestrial, but their larvae and pupae are aquatic. They share this characteristic with several distantly-related groups, such as the dragonflies, mayflies, stoneflies, dobsonflies and alderflies. The ancestors of all these groups were terrestrial, with open tracheal systems, convergently evolving different types of gills for their aquatic larvae as they took to the water to avoid predation. Caddisflies was the only group of these insects to use silk as part of their lifestyle, which has been a contributing factor to their success and why they are the most species-rich order of aquatic insects.

About 14,500 species of caddisfly in 45 families have been recognised worldwide, but many more species remain to be described. Most can be divided into the suborders Integripalpia and Annulipalpia on the basis of the adult mouthparts. The characteristics of adults depend on the palps, wing venation and genitalia of both sexes. The latter two characters have undergone such extensive differentiation among the different superfamilies that the differences between the suborders is not clear-cut. The larvae of annulipalpians are campodeiform (free-living, well sclerotized, long legged predators with dorso-ventrally flattened bodies and protruding mouthparts). The larvae of integripalpians are polypod (poorly sclerotized detritivores, with abdominal prolegs in addition to thoracic legs, living permanently in tight-fitting cases). The affinities of the third suborder, Spicipalpia, are unclear; the larvae are free-living with no cases, instead creating net-like traps from silk.

=== Phylogeny ===
The cladogram of external relationships, based on molecular analysis, shows the order as a clade, sister to the Lepidoptera, and more distantly related to the Diptera (true flies) and Mecoptera (scorpionflies).

- Holometabola
  - Hymenopterida
    Hymenoptera (sawflies, wasps)
  - Aparaglossata
    - Neuropteroidea
      - Coleopterida
        - Coleoptera (beetles)
        - Strepsiptera (twisted-wing parasites)
      - Neuropterida
        - Raphidioptera (snakeflies)
        - - Megaloptera (alderflies and allies)
          - Neuroptera (Lacewings and allies)
    - Panorpida
      - Amphiesmenoptera
        - Lepidoptera (butterflies, moths)
        - Trichoptera (caddisflies)
      - Antliophora
        - Diptera
        - - Mecoptera (scorpionflies)
          - Siphonaptera (fleas)

The cladogram of relationships within the order is based on a 2002 molecular phylogeny using ribosomal RNA, a nuclear elongation factor gene, and mitochondrial cytochrome oxidase. The Annulipalpia and Integripalpia are clades, but the relationships within the Spicipalpia are unclear.

- Trichoptera
  - Annulipalpia (fixed-retreat makers)
  - - Integripalpia (portable-case makers)
    - "Spicipalpia" (paraphyletic?)

== Distribution ==
Caddisflies are found worldwide, with the greater diversity being in warmer regions. They are associated with bodies of freshwater, the larvae being found in lakes, ponds, rivers, streams and other water bodies. The land caddis, Enoicyla pusilla (family: Limnephilidae), lives in the damp litter of the woodland floor. In the United Kingdom it is found in and around the county of Worcestershire in oakwoods.

== Ecology ==
Larva in its underwater habitat

Caddisfly larvae can be found in all feeding guilds in freshwater habitats. Most early stage larvae and some late stage ones are collector-gatherers, picking up fragments of organic matter from the benthos. Other species are collector-filterers, sieving organic particles from the water using silken nets, or hairs on their legs. Some species are scrapers, feeding on the film of algae and other periphyton that grows on underwater objects in sunlight. Others are shredder-herbivores, chewing fragments off living plant material while others are shredder-detritivores, gnawing at rotting wood or chewing dead leaves that have been pre-processed by bacteria and fungi; most of the nutrients of the latter group come from consumption of the bacteria and fungi. The predatory species either actively hunt their prey, typically other insects, tiny crustaceans and worms, or lie in wait for unwary invertebrates to come too close. A few species feed opportunistically on dead animals or fish, and some Leptoceridae larvae feed on freshwater sponges.

One such opportunistic species is Gumaga nigricula (family: Sericostomatidae) which has been observed scavenging fish carcasses and even bits of deer flesh. This particular family of caddisflies is typically classified among the shredders, suggesting caution when classifying macroinvertebrates into strict ecological functional groups, as some may shift their diets opportunistically.

Like mayflies, stoneflies and dragonflies, but to a somewhat lesser extent, caddisflies are an indicator of good water quality; they die out of streams with polluted waters. They are an important part of the food web, both larvae and adults being eaten by many fish. The newly hatched adult is particularly vulnerable as it struggles to the surface after emerging from the submerged pupa, and as it dries its wings. The fish find these new adults easy pickings, and fishing flies resembling them can be successful for anglers at the right time of year.

The adult stage of a caddisfly may only survive for a few weeks; many species do not feed as adults and die soon after breeding, but some species are known to feed on nectar. The winged insects are nocturnal and provide food for night-flying birds, bats, small mammals, amphibians and arthropods. The larval stage lasts much longer, often for one or more years, and has a bigger impact on the environment. They form an important part of the diet of fish such as the trout. The fish acquire them by two means, either plucking them off vegetation or the stream-bed as the larvae move about, or during the daily behavioural drift; this drift happens during the night for many species of aquatic larvae, or around midday for some cased caddisfly species, and may result from population pressures or be a dispersal device. The larvae may drift in great numbers either close to the bottom, in mid-water or just below the surface. The fish swallow them whole, case and all.

== Underwater structures ==
=== Cases ===
Caddisflies are best known for the portable cases created by their larvae. About thirty families of caddisfly, members of the suborder Integripalpia, adopt this stratagem. These larvae eat detritus, largely decaying vegetable material, and the dead leaf fragments on which they feed tend to accumulate in hollows, in slow-moving sections of streams and behind stones and tree roots. The cases provide protection to the larvae as they make their way between these resources.

The case is a tubular structure made of silk, secreted from salivary glands near the mouth of the larva, and is started soon after the egg hatches. Various reinforcements may be incorporated into its structure, the nature of the materials and design depending on the larva's genetic makeup; this means that caddisfly larvae can be recognised by their cases down to family, and even genus level. The materials used include grains of sand, larger fragments of rock, bark, sticks, leaves, seeds and mollusc shells. These are neatly arranged and stuck onto the outer surface of the silken tube. As the larva grows, more material is added at the front, and the larva can turn round in the tube and trim the rear end so that it does not drag along the substrate.

Caddisfly cases are open at both ends, the larvae drawing oxygenated water through the posterior end, over their gills, and pumping it out of the wider, anterior end. The larvae move around inside the tubes and this helps maintain the water current; the lower the oxygen content of the water, the more active the larvae need to be. This mechanism enables caddisfly larvae to live in waters too low in oxygen content to support stonefly and mayfly larvae.

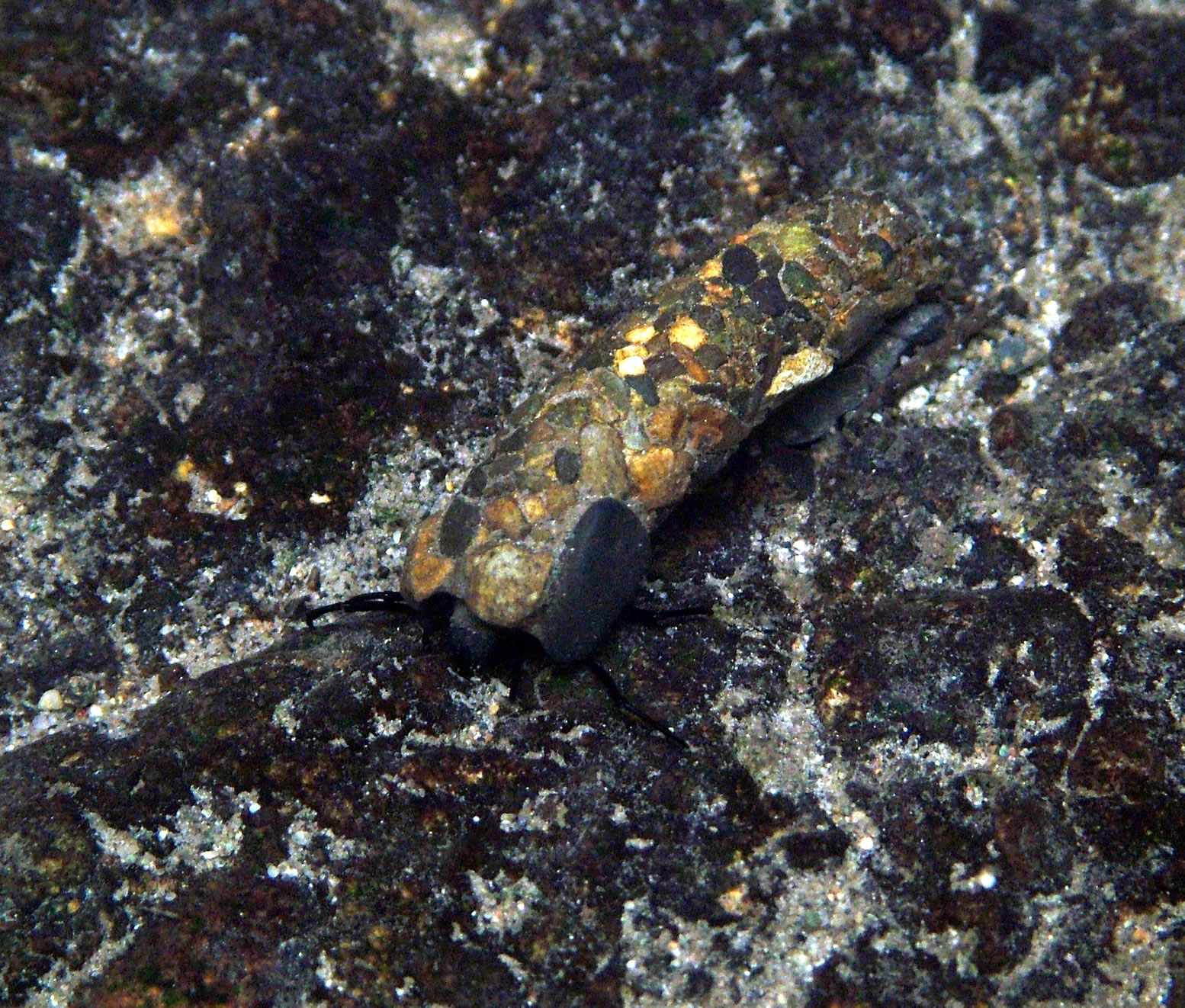
Larva with portable case of rock fragments

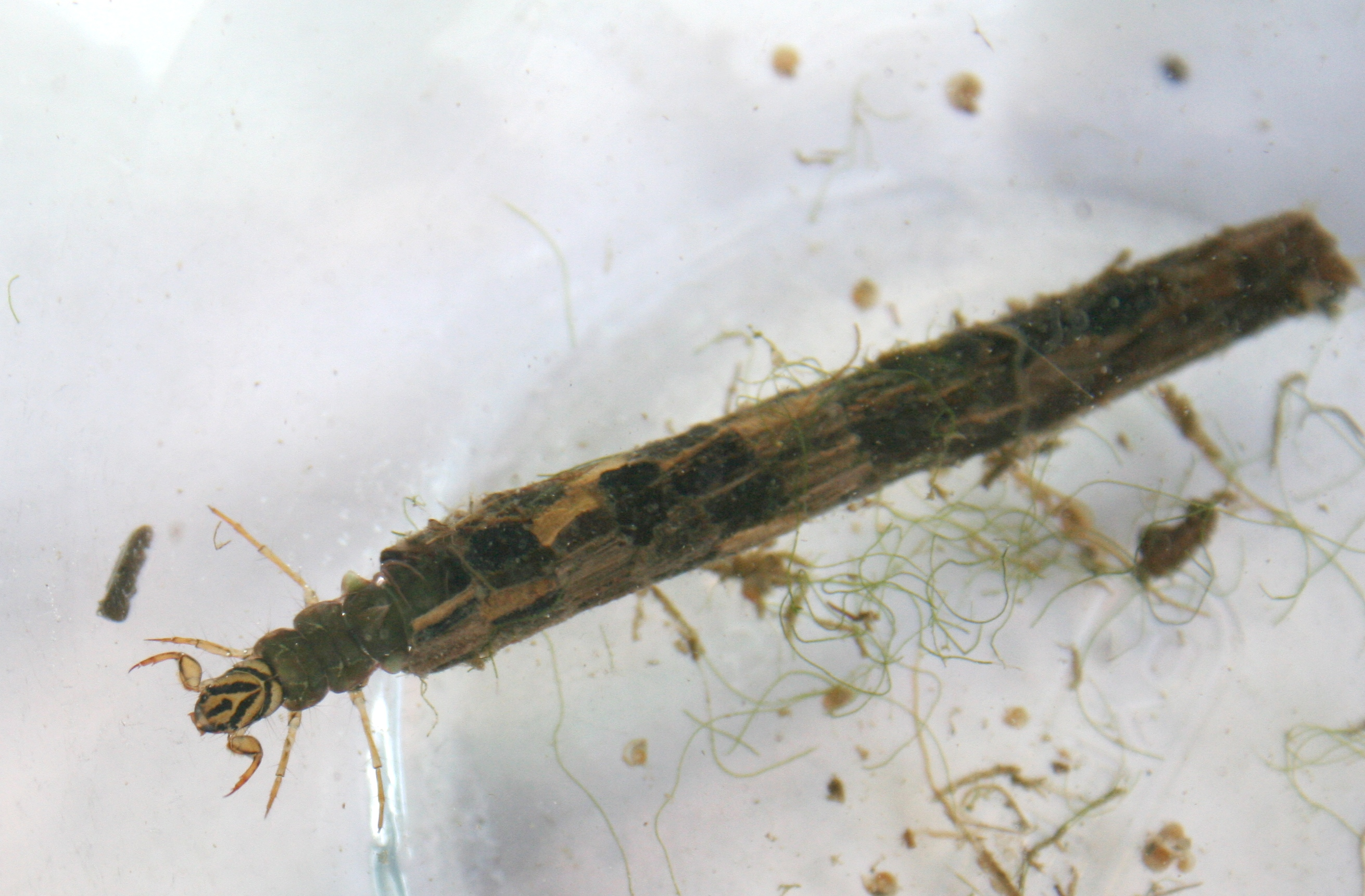
Larva emerging from case made of plant material

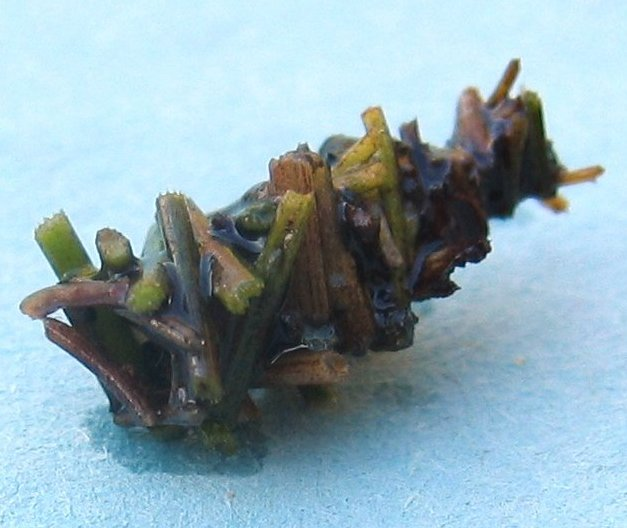
Larval case of Limnephilidae made of bitten-off plant pieces

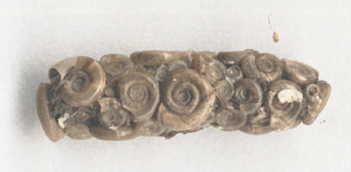
Case of Limnephilus flavicornis made of snail shells

=== Fixed retreats ===
In contrast to larvae that have portable cases, members of the Annulipalpia have a completely different feeding strategy. They make fixed retreats in which they remain stationary, waiting for food to come to them. Members of the Psychomyiidae, Ecnomidae and Xiphocentronidae families construct simple tubes of sand and other particles held together by silk and anchored to the bottom, and feed on the accumulations of silt formed when suspended material is deposited. The tube can be lengthened when the growing larva needs to feed in new areas. More complex tubes, short and flattened, are built by Polycentropodidae larvae in hollows in rocks or other submerged objects, sometimes with strands of silk suspended across the nearby surface. These larvae are carnivorous, resembling spiders in their feeding habits and rushing out of their retreat to attack any unwary small prey crawling across the surface.

=== Silk domes ===
Larvae of members of the family Glossosomatidae in the suborder Spicipalpia create dome-shaped enclosures of silk which enables them to graze on the periphyton, the biological film that grows on stones and other objects, while carrying their enclosure around like turtles. In the family Philopotamidae, the nets are sac-like, with intricate structure and tiny mesh. The larvae have specialised mouthparts to scrape off the microflora that get trapped in the net as water flows through.

=== Nets ===
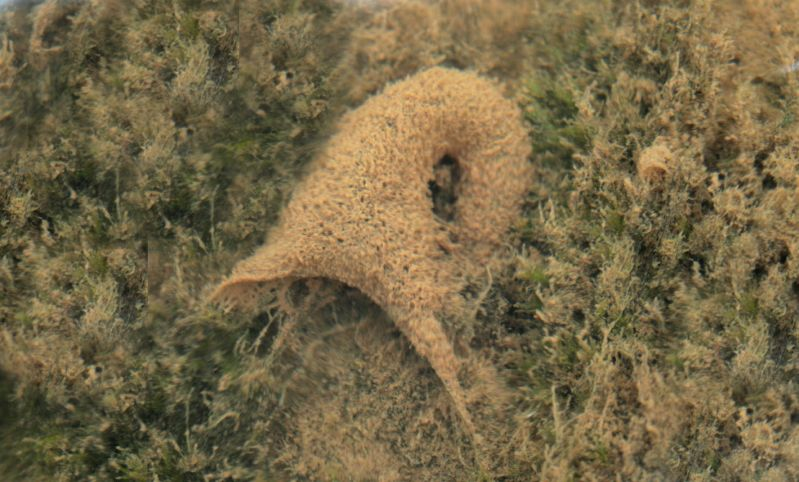
Net made by a larva of the suborder Spicipalpia

The larvae of other species of caddisfly make nets rather than cases. These are silken webs stretching between aquatic vegetation and over stones. These net-making larvae usually live in running water, different species occupying different habitats with varying water speeds. There is a constant drift of invertebrates washed downstream by the current, and these animals, and bits of debris, accumulate in the nets which serve both as food traps and as retreats.

== Development and morphology ==
Caddisfly larvae are aquatic, with six pairs of tracheal gills on the underside of the abdomen. The eggs are laid above water on emergent twigs or vegetation or on the water surface although females of some species enter water to choose sites. Although most species lay eggs, a few in the genus Triplectides are ovoviviparous. Some species lay eggs on land and although most are associated with freshwater, a few like Symphitoneuria are found in coastal saline water. Philanisus plebeius females lay their eggs into the coelomic cavity of intertidal starfish. The larvae are long and roughly cylindrical, very similar to those of Lepidoptera but lacking prolegs. In case-bearing species, the heads are heavily sclerotised while the abdomen is soft; the antennae are short and the mouthparts adapted for biting. Each of the usually ten abdominal segments bears a pair of legs with a single tarsal joint. In case-bearing species, the first segment bears three papillae, one above and two at the sides, which anchor the larva centrally in the tube. The posterior segment bears a pair of hooks for grappling. There are five to seven larval instars, followed by an aquatic pupa which has functional mandibles (to cut through the case), gills, and swimming legs.

The pupal cocoon is spun from silk, but like the larval case, often has other materials attached. When pupating, species that build portable cases attach them to some underwater object, seal the front and back apertures against predators while still allowing water to flow through, and pupate within it. Once fully developed, most pupal caddisflies cut through their cases with a special pair of mandibles, swim up to the water surface, moult using the exuviae as a floating platform, and emerge as fully formed adults. They can often fly immediately after breaking from their pupal cuticle. Emergence is mainly univoltine (once per year) with all the adults of a species emerging at the same time. Development is within a year in warm places, but takes over a year in high latitudes and at high elevation in mountain lakes and streams.

The adult caddisfly is a medium-sized insect with membranous, hairy wings, which are held in a tent-wise fashion when the insect is at rest. The antennae are fairly long and threadlike, and the legs have five tarsi (lower leg joints). The mouthparts in adults are reduced, with a unique feature called the haustellum. This is a short proboscis formed by the fusion of the prelabium and the hypopharynx; it is a defining trait of the order. Adults are nocturnal and are attracted to light. Some species are strong fliers and can disperse to new localities, but many fly only weakly. Adults are usually short-lived, most being non-feeders and equipped only to breed. Once mated, the female caddisfly lays eggs in a gelatinous mass, attaching them above or below the water surface depending on species. The eggs hatch in a few weeks.

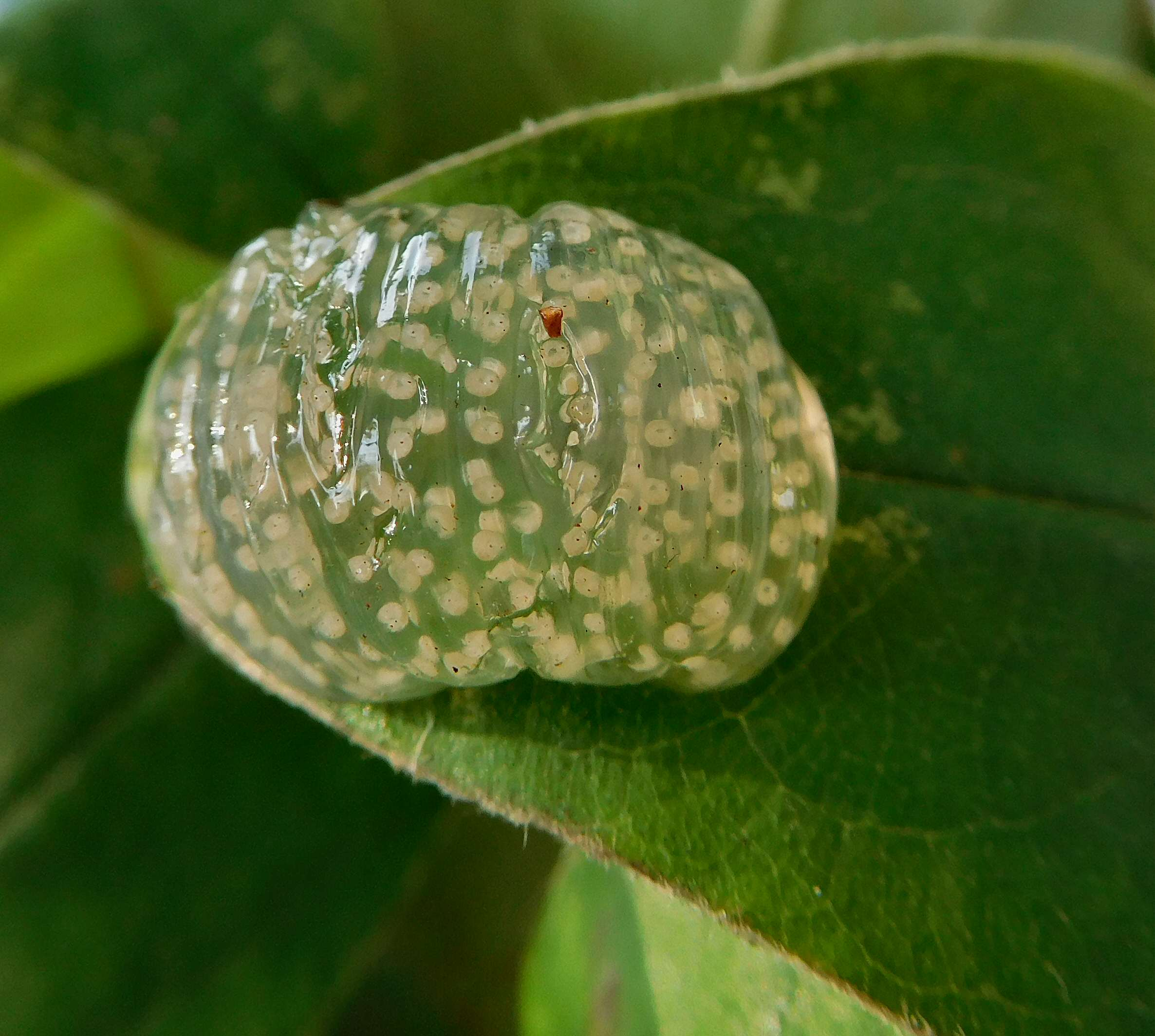
Egg mass on leaf away from water

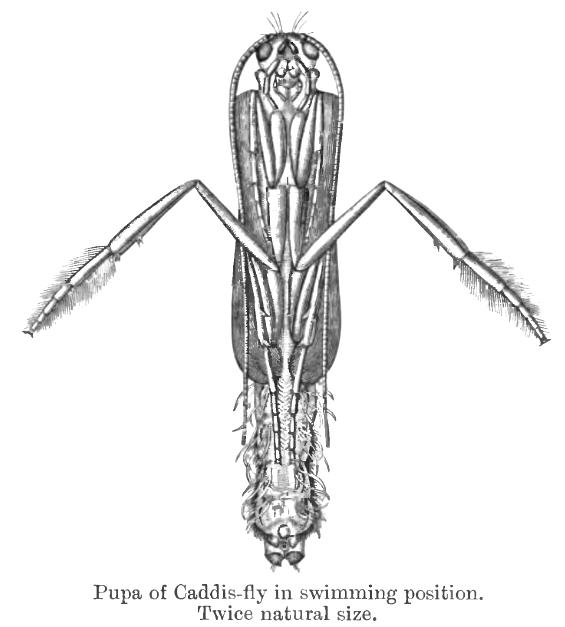
Pupa with oar-like swimming legs

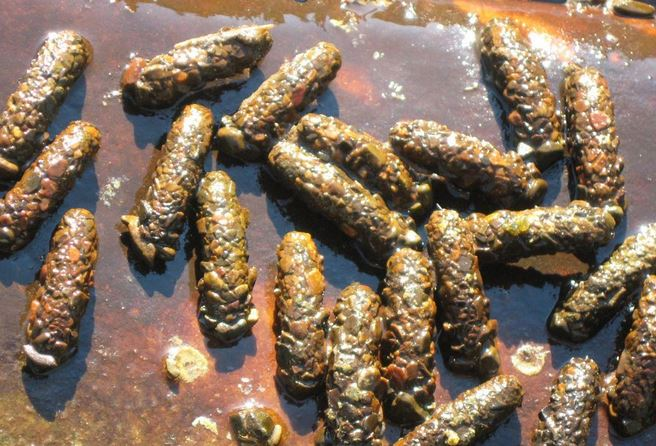
Pupae

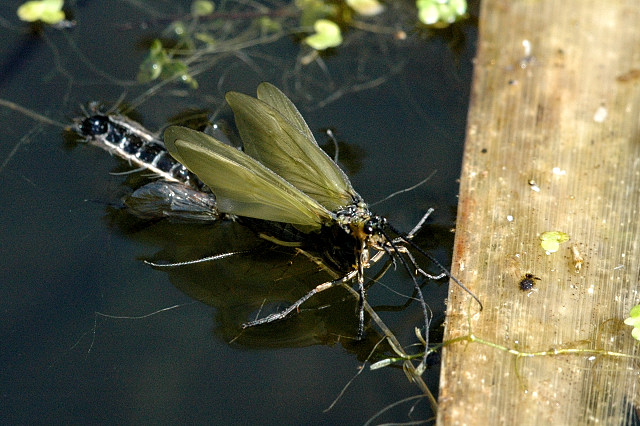
Parachiona picicornis adult emerging from aquatic pupa

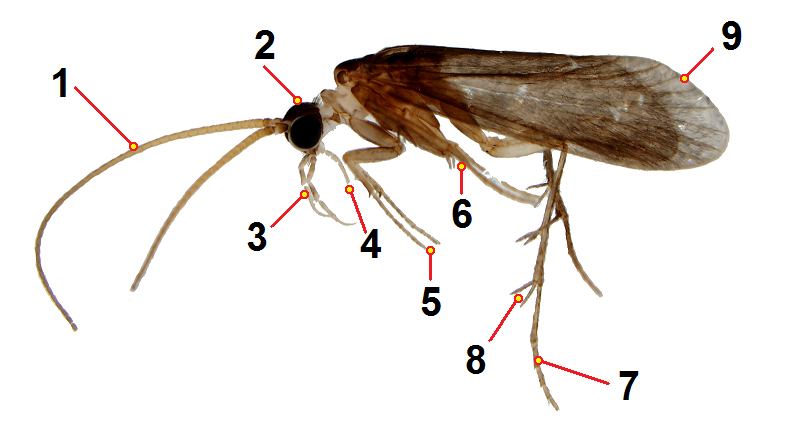
Adult

== Relationship with humans ==
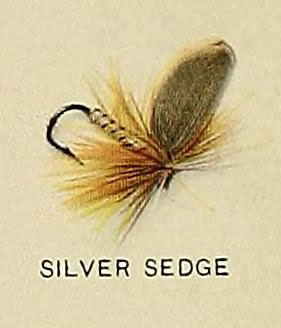
"Silver Sedge" fishing fly mimicking Lepidostoma caddisfly, from Trout fly-fishing in America

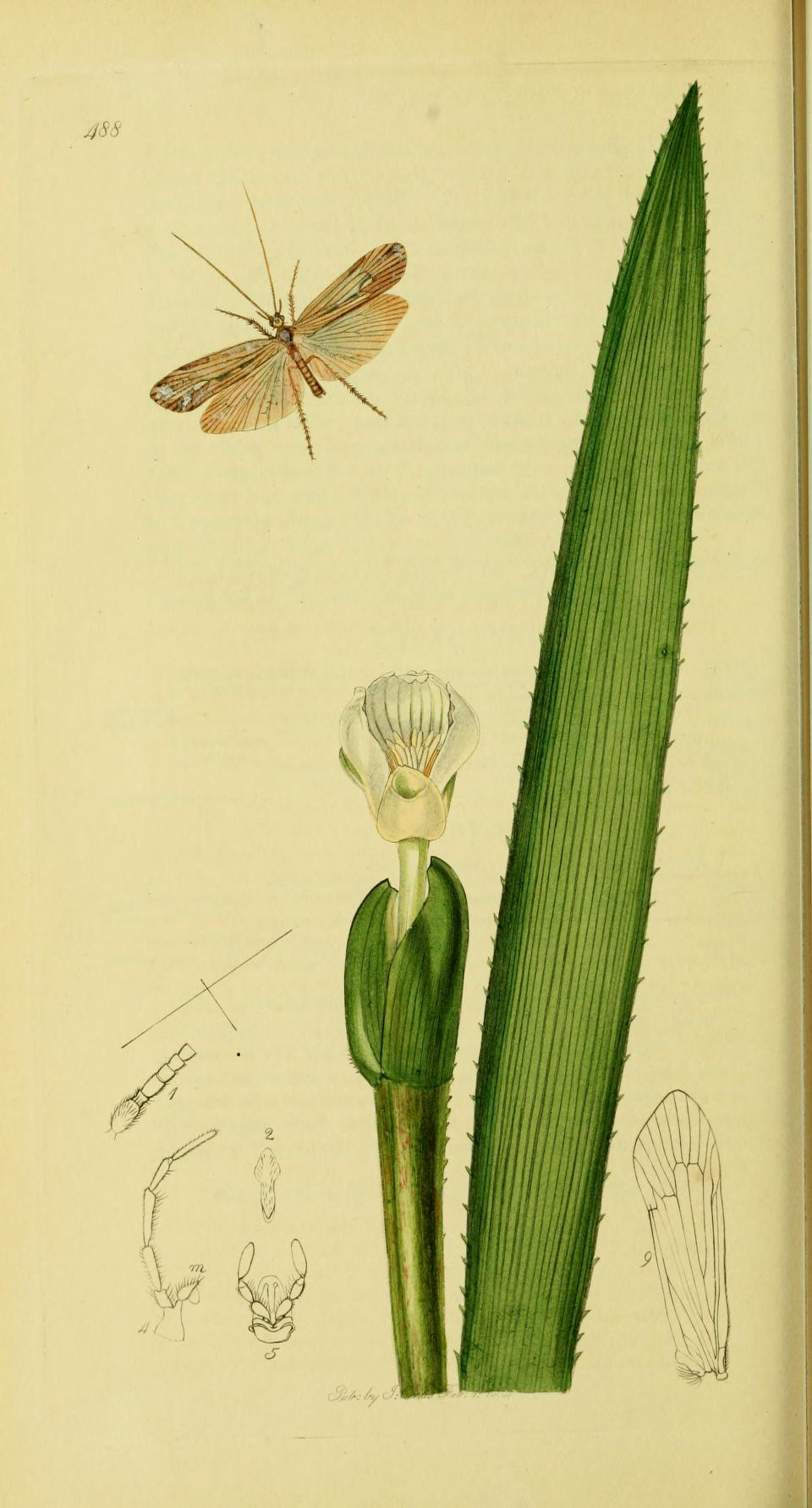
"Limnephilus elegans the Elegant Grannom", from British Entomology by John Curtis, c. 1840

=== In angling ===
Adult caddisflies are called sedges by anglers. Individual species emerge en masse at different times, and are used one after the other, often for only a few days each year, as models for artificial fishing flies for fly fishing in trout streams. A mass emergence is known as a hatch. Each type has its own angling name, so for example Mystacides is the dancer; Sericostoma the caperer; Leptocerus the silverhorn; Phryganea the murragh or great red sedge; Brachycentrus subnubilis the grannom; Lepidostoma the silver sedge; Oecetis the longhorn sedge; Cheumatopsyche the little sister sedge; Helicopsyche the speckled Peter, an important fishing fly in North America; and Hydropsyche the specked sedge, perhaps the most important caddisfly genus for anglers with over 50 species of net-makers.

=== As bioindicators ===
Caddisflies are useful as bioindicators (of good water quality), since they are sensitive to water pollution, and are large enough to be assessed conveniently in the field. Some species indicate undisturbed habitat, and some indicate degraded habitat. Although caddisflies may be found in waterbodies of varying qualities, species-rich caddisfly assemblages are generally thought to indicate clean water bodies, such as lakes, ponds, and marshes. Together with stoneflies and mayflies, caddisflies feature importantly in bioassessment surveys of streams and other water bodies.

=== In art ===
While caddisflies in the wild construct their cases out of twigs, sand, aquatic plants, and rocks, the French artist Hubert Duprat makes art by providing wild caddisflies with precious stones and other materials. He collected caddisfly larvae from the wild and put them in climate-controlled tanks. He removes the larvae from their original cases and adds precious and semi-precious items such as grains of gold into the tank. The larvae then build new cases out of precious items, creating a unique form of artwork. The resulting works are sold across the world.

=== As food ===
In Japan the larvae of Stenopsyche marmorata are eaten as a delicacy called Zazamushi.

== Taxonomy ==
There are roughly 16,266 extant species in 618 genera and 51 families worldwide.

- Suborder Annulipalpia
  - Superfamily Hydropsychoidea
    - Family Hydropsychidae
  - Superfamily Psychomyioidea
    - Family Dipseudopsidae
    - Family Ecnomidae
    - Family †Electralbertidae
    - Family Polycentropodidae
    - Family Psychomyiidae
    - Family Xiphocentronidae
  - Superfamily Philopotamoidea
    - Family Philopotamidae
    - Family Stenopsychidae
- Suborder Integripalpia
  - Superfamily Leptoceroidea
    - Family Atriplectididae
    - Family Calamoceratidae
    - Family Molannidae
    - Family Leptoceridae
    - Family Limnocentropodidae
    - Family Odontoceridae
    - Family Philorheithridae
  - Superfamily Limnephiloidea
    - Family Apataniidae
    - Family Brachycentridae
    - Family Goeridae
    - Family Limnephilidae
    - Family Lepidostomatidae
    - Family Oeconesidae
    - Family Pisuliidae
    - Family Rossianidae
    - Family †Taymyrelectronidae
    - Family Uenoidae
  - Superfamily †Necrotaulioidea
    - Family †Necrotauliidae
  - Superfamily Phyrganeoidea
    - Family †Baissoferidae
    - Family †Dysoneuridae
    - Family †Kalophryganeidae
    - Family Phryganeidae
    - Family Phryganopsychidae
    - Family Plectrotarsidae
  - Superfamily Sericostomatoidea
    - Family Anomalopsychidae
    - Family Antipodoeciidae
    - Family Barbarochthonidae
    - Family Beraeidae
    - Family Calocidae
    - Family Chathamiidae
    - Family Conoesucidae
    - Family Helicophidae
    - Family Helicopsychidae
    - Family Hydrosalpingidae
    - Family Kokiriidae
    - Family Petrothrincidae
    - Family Sericostomatidae
  - Superfamily Tasimioidea
    - Family Tasimiidae
  - Superfamily †Vitimotaulioidea
    - Family †Vitimotauliidae
    - Family †Cladochoristidae
    - Family †Microptysmatidae
    - Family †Prosepididontidae
    - Family †Protomeropidae
    - Family †Uraloptysmatidae
- Suborder Spicipalpia
  - Superfamily Hydroptiloidea
    - Family Glossosomatidae
    - Family Hydroptilidae
    - Family Ptilocolepidae
  - Superfamily Rhyacophiloidea
    - Family Hydrobiosidae
    - Family Rhyacophilidae
