= List of Ceraclea species =

This is a list of 134 species in Ceraclea, a genus of long-horned caddisflies in the family Leptoceridae.

== Ceraclea species ==
- Ceraclea acutipennis Yang & Tian, 1989^{i c g}
- Ceraclea alabamae Harris, 1989^{i c g}
- Ceraclea alagma (Ross, 1938)^{i c g}
- Ceraclea albimacula (Rambur, 1842)^{i c g}
- Ceraclea alboguttata (Hagen, 1860)^{i c g}
- Ceraclea albosticta (Hagen, 1861)^{i c g}
- Ceraclea alces (Ross, 1941)^{i c g}
- Ceraclea ampliata Yang & Morse, 2000^{i c g}
- Ceraclea ancylus (Vorhies, 1909)^{i c g}
- Ceraclea annulicornis (Stephens, 1836)^{i c g}
- Ceraclea arielles (Denning, 1942)^{i c g}
- Ceraclea armata Kumanski, 1991^{i c g}
- Ceraclea aurea (Pictet, 1834)^{i c g}
- Ceraclea batia (Mosely, 1939)^{i c g}
- Ceraclea bifurcata Morse, Yang & Levanidova, 1997^{i c g}
- Ceraclea brachyacantha Yang & Tian, 1987^{i c g}
- Ceraclea brachycerca Yang & Tian, 1989^{i c g}
- Ceraclea brachyclada Yang & Morse, 1997^{i c g}
- Ceraclea brevis (Etnier, 1968)^{i c g}
- Ceraclea cama (Flint, 1965)^{i c g}
- Ceraclea cancellata (Betten, 1934)^{i c g}
- Ceraclea celata Yang & Morse, 2000^{i c g}
- Ceraclea chirindensis (Kimmins, 1956)^{i c g}
- Ceraclea complicata (Kobayashi, 1984)^{i c g}
- Ceraclea congolensis (Mosely, 1939)^{i c g}
- Ceraclea copha (Ross, 1938)^{i c g}
- Ceraclea corbeti (Kimmins, 1957)^{i c g}
- Ceraclea coreana Kumanski, 1991^{i c g}
- Ceraclea cuprea (Barnard, 1934)^{i c g}
- Ceraclea curva Yang & Tian, 1989^{i c g}
- Ceraclea diluta (Hagen, 1861)^{i c g}
- Ceraclea dingwuschanella (Ulmer, 1932)^{i c g}
- Ceraclea disemeiensis Yang in Yang, Wang & Leng, 1997^{i c g}
- Ceraclea dissimilis (Stephens, 1836)^{i c g}
- Ceraclea distinguenda (Martynov, 1936)^{i c g}
- Ceraclea egeria Malicky & Chaibu in Malicky, 2000^{i c g}
- Ceraclea elongata Yang & Morse, 2000^{i c g}
- Ceraclea emeiensis Yang & Tian, 1989^{i c g}
- Ceraclea enodis Whitlock & Morse, 1994^{b}
- Ceraclea ensifera (Martynov, 1935)^{i c g}
- Ceraclea equiramosa Morse, Yang & Levanidova, 1997^{i c g}
- Ceraclea erratica (Milne, 1936)^{i c g}
- Ceraclea erulla (Ross, 1938)^{i c g}
- Ceraclea excisa (Morton, 1904)^{i c g}
- Ceraclea exilis Morse, 1988^{i c g}
- Ceraclea flava (Banks, 1904)^{i c g}
- Ceraclea floridana (Banks, 1903)^{i c g}
- Ceraclea fooensis (Mosely, 1942)^{i c g}
- Ceraclea forcipata (Forsslund, 1935)^{i c g}
- Ceraclea fulva (Rambur, 1842)^{i c g}
- Ceraclea gigantea Kumanski, 1991^{i c g}
- Ceraclea giudicellii Marlier, 1986^{i c g}
- Ceraclea globosa Yang & Morse, 1988^{i c g}
- Ceraclea grossa Yang & Morse, 2000^{i c g}
- Ceraclea guineensis Gibon, 1986^{i c g}
- Ceraclea hastata (Botosaneanu, 1970)^{i c g}
- Ceraclea huangi (Tian, 1981)^{i c g}
- Ceraclea indistincta (Forsslund, 1935)^{i c g}
- Ceraclea interispina Yang & Tian, 1987^{i c g}
- Ceraclea isurumuniya (Schmid, 1958)^{i c g}
- Ceraclea kamonis (Tsuda, 1942)^{i c g}
- Ceraclea kolthoffi (Ulmer, 1932)^{i c g}
- Ceraclea latahensis (Smith, 1962)^{i c g}
- Ceraclea lirata Yang & Morse, 1988^{i c g}
- Ceraclea litania Botosaneanu & Dia in Dia & Botosaneanu, 1983^{i c g}
- Ceraclea lobulata (Martynov, 1935)^{i c g}
- Ceraclea maccalmonti Moulton & Stewart, 1992^{i c g}
- Ceraclea macronemoides Malicky, 1975^{i c g}
- Ceraclea maculata (Banks, 1899)^{i c g b}
- Ceraclea major (Hwang, 1957)^{i c g}
- Ceraclea marginata (Banks, 1911)^{i c g}
- Ceraclea martynovi (Forsslund, 1940)^{i c g}
- Ceraclea mentiea (Walker, 1852)^{i c g}
- Ceraclea merga Chen & Morce, 1992^{g}
- Ceraclea microbatia (Marlier, 1956)^{i c g}
- Ceraclea minima (Kimmins, 1956)^{i c g}
- Ceraclea mitis (Tsuda, 1942)^{i c g}
- Ceraclea modesta (Banks, 1920)^{i c g}
- Ceraclea morsei Kumanski, 1991^{i c g}
- Ceraclea nankingensis (Hwang, 1957)^{i c g}
- Ceraclea neffi (Resh, 1974)^{i c g}
- Ceraclea nepha (Ross, 1944)^{i c g}
- Ceraclea nibenica Gonzalez & Terra, 1988^{i c g}
- Ceraclea nigronervosa (Retzius, 1783)^{i c g}
- Ceraclea njalaensis (Mosely, 1933)^{i c g}
- Ceraclea norfolki (Navas, 1917)^{i c g}
- Ceraclea nycteola Mey, 1997^{i c g}
- Ceraclea nygmatica (Navas, 1917)^{i c g}
- Ceraclea ophioderus (Ross, 1938)^{i c g}
- Ceraclea parakamonis Yang & Morse, 2000^{i c g}
- Ceraclea perplexa (McLachlan, 1877)^{i c g}
- Ceraclea polyacantha Yang & Tian, 1987^{i c g}
- Ceraclea protonepha Morse & Ross in Morse, 1975^{i c g}
- Ceraclea pulchra (Ulmer, 1912)^{i c g}
- Ceraclea punctata (Banks, 1894)^{i c g}
- Ceraclea quadrispina Marlier, 1965^{i c g}
- Ceraclea ramburi Morse, 1975^{i c g}
- Ceraclea resurgens (Walker, 1852)^{i c g b}
- Ceraclea riparia (Albarda, 1874)^{i c g}
- Ceraclea ruthae (Flint, 1965)^{i c g}
- Ceraclea satasookae ^{g}
- Ceraclea schoutedeni (Navás, 1930)^{i c g}
- Ceraclea seikunis (Kobayashi, 1987)^{i c g}
- Ceraclea semicircularis Yang & Morse, 1997^{i c g}
- Ceraclea senilis (Burmeister, 1839)^{i c g}
- Ceraclea shuotsuensis (Tsuda, 1942)^{i c g}
- Ceraclea sibirica (Ulmer, 1906)^{i c g}
- Ceraclea signaticornis (Ulmer, 1926)^{i c g}
- Ceraclea sinensis (Forsslund, 1935)^{i c g}
- Ceraclea singularis Yang & Morse, 2000^{i c g}
- Ceraclea slossonae (Banks, 1938)^{i c g b}
- Ceraclea sobradiei (Navas, 1917)^{i c g}
- Ceraclea spinosa (Navás, 1930)^{i c g}
- Ceraclea spinulicolis Yang & Morse, 1988^{i c g}
- Ceraclea spongillovorax (Resh, 1974)^{i c g}
- Ceraclea squamosa (Ulmer, 1905)^{i c g}
- Ceraclea submacula (Walker, 1852)^{i c g}
- Ceraclea superba (Tsuda, 1942)^{i c g}
- Ceraclea takatsunis (Kobayashi, 1987)^{i c g}
- Ceraclea tarsipunctata (Vorhies, 1909)^{i c g}
- Ceraclea thongnooi Laudee, Seetapan & Malicky, 2017^{g}
- Ceraclea thongpongi Laudee, Seetapan & Malicky, 2017^{g}
- Ceraclea transversa (Hagen, 1861)^{i c g b}
- Ceraclea trifurca Yang & Morse, 1988^{i c g}
- Ceraclea trilobulata Morse, Yang & Levanidova, 1997^{i c g}
- Ceraclea trisdikooni Laudee, Seetapan & Malicky, 2017^{g}
- Ceraclea ungulifera (Kimmins, 1963)^{i c g}
- Ceraclea uvalo (Ross, 1938)^{i c g}
- Ceraclea vaciva Yang & Morse, 1997^{i c g}
- Ceraclea valentinae Arefina, 1997^{i c g}
- Ceraclea variabilis (Martynov, 1935)^{i c g}
- Ceraclea vertreesi (Denning, 1966)^{i c g}
- Ceraclea wetzeli (Ross, 1941)^{i c g}
- Ceraclea yangi Mosely, 1942^{i c g}

Data sources: i = ITIS, c = Catalogue of Life, g = GBIF, b = Bugguide.net
