= List of Triaenodes species =

This is a list of 177 species in Triaenodes, a genus of long-horned caddisflies in the family Leptoceridae.

== Triaenodes species ==
- Triaenodes aba Milne, 1935^{b}
- Triaenodes aberrans (Marlier, 1965)^{i c g}
- Triaenodes abruptus Flint, 1991^{i c g}
- Triaenodes abus Milne, 1935^{i c g}
- Triaenodes africanus Ulmer, 1907^{i c g}
- Triaenodes allax Neboiss & Wells, 1998^{i c g}
- Triaenodes anomalus Flint, 1967^{i c g}
- Triaenodes apicatus Navás, 1934^{i c g}
- Triaenodes apicomaculatus Mey, 1990^{i c g}
- Triaenodes assimilis (Banks, 1937)^{i c g}
- Triaenodes atalomus Neboiss & Wells, 1998^{i c g}
- Triaenodes aureus Kimmins, 1962^{i c g}
- Triaenodes barbarae Neboiss & Wells, 1998^{i c g}
- Triaenodes baris Ross, 1938^{i c g b}
- Triaenodes bernardi Vaillant, 1953^{i c g}
- Triaenodes bernaysae Korboot, 1964^{i c g}
- Triaenodes bicolor (Curtis, 1834)^{i c g}
- Triaenodes bifasciatus Navás, 1934^{i c g}
- Triaenodes bifidus Jacquemart, 1966^{i c g}
- Triaenodes bilobatus Yang & Morse, 2000^{i c g}
- Triaenodes boettcheri Ulmer, 1930^{i c g}
- Triaenodes borealis Banks, 1900^{i c g}
- Triaenodes botosaneanui Marlier, 1978^{i c g}
- Triaenodes bulupendek Andersen & Holzenthal, 1999^{i c g}
- Triaenodes calamintella Mey, 1995^{i c g}
- Triaenodes camurus Neboiss & Wells, 1998^{i c g}
- Triaenodes celatus Neboiss & Wells, 1998^{i c g}
- Triaenodes cheliferus (Mosely, 1932)^{i c g}
- Triaenodes clarus Jacquemart, 1961^{i c g}
- Triaenodes clavatus (Mosely, 1932)^{i c g}
- Triaenodes cloe (Hagen, 1859)^{i c g}
- Triaenodes columbicus Ulmer, 1909^{i c g}
- Triaenodes conjugatus Neboiss & Wells, 1998^{i c g}
- Triaenodes connatus Ross, 1959^{i c g}
- Triaenodes conspersus (Rambur, 1842)^{g}
- Triaenodes contartus Jacquemart & Statzner, 1981^{i c g}
- Triaenodes copelatus Neboiss & Wells, 1998^{i c g}
- Triaenodes corallinus Kimmins, 1962^{i c g}
- Triaenodes corynotrus Neboiss & Wells, 1998^{i c g}
- Triaenodes costalis Kimmins, 1962^{i c g}
- Triaenodes cumberlandensis Etnier & Way, 1973^{i c g}
- Triaenodes cuspiosus Neboiss & Wells, 1998^{i c g}
- Triaenodes cymulosus Neboiss & Wells, 1998^{i c g}
- Triaenodes darfuricus Mosely, 1936^{i c g}
- Triaenodes delicatus Navas, 1924^{i c g}
- Triaenodes demoulini Jacquemart, 1967^{i c g}
- Triaenodes dentatus Banks, 1914^{i c g}
- Triaenodes dibolia Neboiss & Wells, 1998^{i c g}
- Triaenodes difformis Mosely, 1932^{i c g}
- Triaenodes dipsia ^{b}
- Triaenodes dipsius Ross, 1938^{i c g}
- Triaenodes dolabratus Gibbs, 1973^{i c g}
- Triaenodes doryphorus Neboiss & Wells, 1998^{i c g}
- Triaenodes drepana Neboiss & Wells, 1998^{i c g}
- Triaenodes dubius Mosely, 1934^{i c g}
- Triaenodes dusrus Schmid, 1965^{i c g}
- Triaenodes dysmica Neboiss & Wells, 1998^{i c g}
- Triaenodes elegantulus Ulmer, 1908^{i c g}
- Triaenodes empheirus Neboiss & Wells, 1998^{i c g}
- Triaenodes esakii Tsuda, 1941^{i c g}
- Triaenodes etheira Neboiss & Wells, 1998^{i c g}
- Triaenodes excisus Kimmins, 1957^{i c g}
- Triaenodes eximius Schmid, 1994^{i c g}
- Triaenodes falculatus Kimmins, 1956^{i c g}
- Triaenodes fantasio Schmid, 1994^{i c g}
- Triaenodes fijianus Mosely, 1941^{i c g}
- Triaenodes flavescens Banks, 1900^{i c g b}
- Triaenodes florida Ross, 1941^{i c g}
- Triaenodes foliformis Yang & Morse, 2000^{i c g}
- Triaenodes forficatus Neboiss & Wells, 1998^{i c g}
- Triaenodes fortunio Schmid, 1994^{i c g}
- Triaenodes fulvus Navás, 1931^{i c g}
- Triaenodes furcellus Ross, 1959^{i c g}
- Triaenodes fuscinulus Neboiss & Wells, 1998^{i c g}
- Triaenodes gazella (Hagen, 1859)^{i c g}
- Triaenodes ghana Kimmins, 1957^{i c g}
- Triaenodes gibberosus Neboiss & Wells, 1998^{i c g}
- Triaenodes hastatus Ulmer, 1908^{i c g}
- Triaenodes hauseri Mey, 1998^{i c g}
- Triaenodes helo Milne, 1934^{i c g}
- Triaenodes hickini Kimmins, 1957^{i c g}
- Triaenodes hirsutus Jacquemart, 1966^{i c g}
- Triaenodes hoenei Schmid, 1959^{i c g}
- Triaenodes hybos Mey, 1998^{i c g}
- Triaenodes ignitus (Walker, 1852)^{i c g}
- Triaenodes imakus Gibbs, 1973^{i c g}
- Triaenodes implexus Neboiss & Wells, 1998^{i c g}
- Triaenodes indicus Martynov, 1936^{i c g}
- Triaenodes inflexus Morse, 1971^{i c g}
- Triaenodes injusta Hagen, 1861^{b}
- Triaenodes injustus (Hagen, 1861)^{i c g}
- Triaenodes insulanus Ulmer, 1951^{i c g}
- Triaenodes insularis Navás, 1936^{i c g}
- Triaenodes intricata Neboiss, 1977^{i c g}
- Triaenodes jubatus Neboiss, 1982^{i c g}
- Triaenodes kimilus Mosely, 1939^{i c g}
- Triaenodes laamii Dakki, 1980^{i c g}
- Triaenodes laciniatus Neboiss & Wells, 1998^{i c g}
- Triaenodes lanceolatus Kimmins, 1957^{i c g}
- Triaenodes lankarama Schmid, 1958^{i c g}
- Triaenodes legonus Mosely, 1939^{i c g}
- Triaenodes longispinus Kimmins, 1962^{i c g}
- Triaenodes loriai Navás, 1932^{i c g}
- Triaenodes lurideolus Mey, 1990^{i c g}
- Triaenodes manni Banks, 1936^{i c g}
- Triaenodes marginata Milne, 1934^{b}
- Triaenodes marginatus Sibley, 1926^{i c g}
- Triaenodes mataranka Neboiss & Wells, 1998^{i c g}
- Triaenodes melacus Ross, 1947^{i c g}
- Triaenodes melanopeza Neboiss & Wells, 1998^{i c g}
- Triaenodes mondoanus Kimmins, 1962^{i c g}
- Triaenodes moselyi Kimmins, 1962^{i c g}
- Triaenodes mouldsi Neboiss & Wells, 1998^{i c g}
- Triaenodes nesiotinus Neboiss & Wells, 1998^{i c g}
- Triaenodes nigrolineatus Kimmins, 1962^{i c g}
- Triaenodes niwai Iwata, 1927^{i c g}
- Triaenodes notalius Neboiss & Wells, 1998^{i c g}
- Triaenodes nox Ross, 1941^{i c g}
- Triaenodes nymphaea Neboiss & Wells, 1998^{i c g}
- Triaenodes ochraceus (Betten & Mosely, 1940)^{i c g}
- Triaenodes ochreellus McLachlan, 1877^{i c g}
- Triaenodes ornatus Ulmer, 1915^{i c g}
- Triaenodes palpalis Banks, 1920^{i c g}
- Triaenodes pellectus Ulmer, 1908^{i c g}
- Triaenodes perissotes Neboiss & Wells, 1998^{i c g}
- Triaenodes perna Ross, 1938^{i c g}
- Triaenodes peruanus Flint & Reyes-Arrunategui, 1991^{i c g}
- Triaenodes phalacris Ross, 1938^{i c g}
- Triaenodes piceus Kimmins, 1957^{i c g}
- Triaenodes plutonis (Banks, 1931)^{i c g}
- Triaenodes polystachius (Marlier, 1957)^{i c g}
- Triaenodes probolius Neboiss & Wells, 1998^{i c g}
- Triaenodes prosynskii (Marlier & Botosaneanu, 1968)^{i c g}
- Triaenodes qinglingensis Yang & Morse, 2000^{i c g}
- Triaenodes reclusus Neboiss & Wells, 1998^{i c g}
- Triaenodes resimus Neboiss & Wells, 1998^{i c g}
- Triaenodes reuteri (McLachlan, 1880)^{b}
- Triaenodes rufescens Martynov, 1935^{i c g}
- Triaenodes rutellus Neboiss & Wells, 1998^{i c g}
- Triaenodes scottae Gibon, 1982^{i c g}
- Triaenodes semigraphatus Mey, 1990^{i c g}
- Triaenodes sericeus Navás, 1935^{i c g}
- Triaenodes serratus Ulmer, 1912^{i c g}
- Triaenodes siculus (Barnard, 1934)^{i c g}
- Triaenodes sinicus Ulmer, 1932^{i c g}
- Triaenodes smithi Ross, 1959^{i c g}
- Triaenodes spoliatus Mey, 1998^{i c g}
- Triaenodes stipulosus Neboiss & Wells, 1998^{i c g}
- Triaenodes taenius Ross, 1938^{i c g}
- Triaenodes tafanus Kimmins, 1962^{i c g}
- Triaenodes tanzanicus Olah, 1986^{i c g}
- Triaenodes tardus Milne, 1934^{i c g b}
- Triaenodes telefominicus Kumanski, 1979^{i c g}
- Triaenodes teneratus Neboiss & Wells, 1998^{i c g}
- Triaenodes teresis Neboiss & Wells, 1998^{i c g}
- Triaenodes theiophorus Neboiss & Wells, 1998^{i c g}
- Triaenodes tofanus Gibbs, 1973^{i c g}
- Triaenodes torresianus Neboiss & Wells, 1998^{i c g}
- Triaenodes toxeres Neboiss & Wells, 1998^{i c g}
- Triaenodes transversarius Mey, 1990^{i c g}
- Triaenodes triaenodiformis (Ulmer, 1930)^{i c g}
- Triaenodes tridontus Ross, 1938^{i c g}
- Triaenodes trifidus Kimmins, 1957^{i c g}
- Triaenodes triquetrus Neboiss & Wells, 1998^{i c g}
- Triaenodes trivulcio Schmid, 1994^{i c g}
- Triaenodes troubati Gibon, 1982^{i c g}
- Triaenodes unanimis McLachlan, 1877^{i c g}
- Triaenodes uncatus Kimmins, 1962^{i c g}
- Triaenodes ustulatus Kimmins, 1962^{i c g}
- Triaenodes uvidus Neboiss & Wells, 1998^{i c g}
- Triaenodes verberatus Neboiss & Wells, 1998^{i c g}
- Triaenodes vespertinus Neboiss & Wells, 1998^{i c g}
- Triaenodes virgulus Neboiss & Wells, 1998^{i c g}
- Triaenodes voldus Mosely in Mosely & Kimmins, 1953^{i c g}
- Triaenodes vorhiesi Betten, 1934^{i c g}
- Triaenodes wambanus Mosely, 1939^{i c g}
- Triaenodes wannonensis Neboiss & Wells, 1998^{i c g}

Data sources: i = ITIS, c = Catalogue of Life, g = GBIF, b = Bugguide.net
