= List of Setodes species =

This is a list of 221 species in Setodes, a genus of long-horned caddisflies in the family Leptoceridae.

== Setodes species ==
- Setodes abbreviatus Scudder, 1890^{i c g}
- Setodes abhichobhita Schmid, 1987^{i c g}
- Setodes abhirakta Schmid, 1987^{i c g}
- Setodes abhiramika Schmid, 1987^{i c g}
- Setodes abhirupa Schmid, 1987^{i c g}
- Setodes abhrayita Schmid, 1987^{i c g}
- Setodes acchidra Schmid, 1987^{i c g}
- Setodes acutus Navás, 1936^{i c g}
- Setodes adusita Schmid, 1987^{i c g}
- Setodes aethiopicus Kimmins, 1963^{i c g}
- Setodes affinis Jacquemart, 1961^{i c g}
- Setodes agarhita Schmid, 1987^{i c g}
- Setodes akalanka Schmid, 1987^{i c g}
- Setodes akchepana Schmid, 1987^{i c g}
- Setodes akilbicha Schmid, 1987^{i c g}
- Setodes akrura Gordon & Schmid in Schmid, 1987^{i c g}
- Setodes akunchita Schmid, 1987^{i c g}
- Setodes akutila Schmid, 1987^{i c g}
- Setodes akutsita Schmid, 1987^{i c g}
- Setodes alalus Mosely, 1948^{i c g}
- Setodes alampata Schmid, 1987^{i c g}
- Setodes alukcha Schmid, 1987^{i c g}
- Setodes amurensis Martynov, 1935^{i c g}
- Setodes anatolicus Schmid, 1964^{i c g}
- Setodes ancala Yang & Morse, 1989^{i c g}
- Setodes angulatus Chen & Morce^{g}
- Setodes antardhana Schmid, 1987^{i c g}
- Setodes aparimeya Schmid, 1987^{i c g}
- Setodes apinchanga Schmid, 1987^{i c g}
- Setodes apitayati Schmid, 1987^{i c g}
- Setodes arenatus Holzenthal, 1982^{i c g}
- Setodes argentatus Matsumura, 1906^{i c g}
- Setodes argentiferus McLachlan, 1871^{i c g}
- Setodes argentiguttatus Gordon & Schmid, 1987^{i c g}
- Setodes argentipunctellus McLachlan, 1877^{i c g}
- Setodes argentivarius Kimmins, 1963^{i c g}
- Setodes argentoaureus Ulmer, 1915^{i c g}
- Setodes asadharana Schmid, 1987^{i c g}
- Setodes asammuaddha Schmid, 1987^{i c g}
- Setodes atiguna Schmid, 1987^{i c g}
- Setodes atiloma Schmid, 1987^{i c g}
- Setodes atipunya Schmid, 1987^{i c g}
- Setodes atisubhaga Schmid, 1987^{i c g}
- Setodes atitejas Schmid, 1987^{i c g}
- Setodes atymanjula Schmid, 1987^{i c g}
- Setodes atyutkata Schmid, 1987^{i c g}
- Setodes aureomicans Schmid, 1987^{i c g}
- Setodes aureonitens Schmid, 1987^{i c g}
- Setodes baccatus Kimmins, 1957^{i c g}
- Setodes barnardi Scott, 1961^{i c g}
- Setodes bhimachringa Schmid, 1987^{i c g}
- Setodes bispinus Yang & Morse, 1989^{i c g}
- Setodes bracteatus Neboiss, 1982^{i c g}
- Setodes brevicaudatus Yang & Morse, 1989^{i c g}
- Setodes bulgaricus Kumanski & Malicky, 1976^{i c g}
- Setodes carinatus Yang & Morse, 1989^{i c g}
- Setodes chandrakita Schmid, 1987^{i c g}
- Setodes chandravarna Schmid, 1987^{i c g}
- Setodes cheni Yang & Morse, 2000^{i c g}
- Setodes chlorinus Yang & Morse, 1997^{i c g}
- Setodes chrysoplitis Mey, 1998^{i c g}
- Setodes chubhamyu Schmid, 1987^{i c g}
- Setodes crossotus Martynov, 1935^{i c g}
- Setodes curvisetus Kobayashi, 1959^{i c g}
- Setodes dantavarna Schmid, 1987^{i c g}
- Setodes dehensurae Cakin & Malicky, 1983^{i c g}
- Setodes dhanavriddha Schmid, 1987^{i c g}
- Setodes dhanika Schmid, 1987^{i c g}
- Setodes dissobolus Mey, 1998^{i c g}
- Setodes distinctus Yang & Morse, 1989^{i c g}
- Setodes diversus Yang & Morse, 1989^{i c g}
- Setodes divyarupa Schmid, 1987^{i c g}
- Setodes dixiensis Holzenthal, 1982^{i c g}
- Setodes drangianicus Schmid, 1959^{i c g}
- Setodes dundoensis Marlier, 1965^{i c g}
- Setodes egregius Mey, 1998^{i c g}
- Setodes ekachringa Schmid, 1987^{i c g}
- Setodes ekapita Schmid, 1987^{i c g}
- Setodes endymion Malicky & Chantaramongkol in Malicky, 2000^{i c g}
- Setodes epicampes Edwards, 1956^{i c g}
- Setodes excisus Kimmins, 1956^{i c g}
- Setodes exposita Kimmins, 1963^{i c g}
- Setodes falcatus Ulmer, 1930^{i c g}
- Setodes flagellatus Gibbs, 1973^{i c g}
- Setodes flavipennis Banks, 1937^{i c g}
- Setodes fluvialis Kimmins, 1963^{i c g}
- Setodes fluviovivens Mey, 1989^{i c g}
- Setodes forcipatus Kimmins, 1963^{i c g}
- Setodes fragilis Olah, 1985^{i c g}
- Setodes furcatulus Martynov, 1935^{i c g}
- Setodes furcatus Navás, 1932^{i c g}
- Setodes gangaja Gordon & Schmid, 1987^{i c g}
- Setodes gaurichachringa Schmid, 1987^{i c g}
- Setodes geminispinus Yang & Morse, 2000^{i c g}
- Setodes gherni Schmid, 1987^{i c g}
- Setodes gona Mosely, 1939^{i c g}
- Setodes guptapara Malicky, 1979^{i c g}
- Setodes gutika Schmid, 1987^{i c g}
- Setodes gutivriddha Schmid, 1987^{i c g}
- Setodes guttatus (Banks, 1900)^{i c g}
- Setodes gyrosus Yang & Morse, 2000^{i c g}
- Setodes hainanensis Yang & Morse, 1989^{i c g}
- Setodes himaruna Schmid, 1987^{i c g}
- Setodes holocercus Navas, 1923^{i c g}
- Setodes hungaricus Ulmer, 1908^{i c g}
- Setodes ifugella Mey, 1995^{i c g}
- Setodes incertus (Walker, 1852)^{i c g b}
- Setodes iris Hagen, 1858^{i c g}
- Setodes jatisampanna Schmid, 1987^{i c g}
- Setodes kadrava Schmid, 1987^{i c g}
- Setodes kalyana Schmid, 1987^{i c g}
- Setodes kantyamrita Schmid, 1987^{i c g}
- Setodes kapchajalaja Schmid, 1987^{i c g}
- Setodes karnyi Ulmer, 1930^{i c g}
- Setodes khechara Schmid, 1987^{i c g}
- Setodes kimminsi Jacquemart, 1961^{i c g}
- Setodes klakahanus Ulmer, 1951^{i c g}
- Setodes kuehbandneri Malicky in Sipahiler & Malicky, 1987^{i c g}
- Setodes kugleri Botosaneanu & Gasith, 1971^{i c g}
- Setodes kumara Schmid, 1987^{i c g}
- Setodes lamellatus Yang & Morse, 2000^{i c g}
- Setodes lineatus Banks, 1913^{i c g}
- Setodes longicaudatus Yang & Morse, 1989^{i c g}
- Setodes madhuvarna Schmid, 1987^{i c g}
- Setodes mahabichu Schmid, 1987^{i c g}
- Setodes manimekhala Schmid, 1987^{i c g}
- Setodes manivriddha Schmid, 1987^{i c g}
- Setodes martini Navas, 1933^{i c g}
- Setodes mauktikavriddha Schmid, 1987^{i c g}
- Setodes meghavarna Schmid, 1987^{i c g}
- Setodes miloi Gibon, 1986^{i c g}
- Setodes minutus Tsuda, 1942^{i c g}
- Setodes monicae Schmid, 1987^{i c g}
- Setodes muglaensis Sipahiler, 1989^{i c g}
- Setodes nagarjouna Schmid, 1961^{i c g}
- Setodes navanita Schmid, 1987^{i c g}
- Setodes nigroochraceus Mosely, 1951^{i c g}
- Setodes nirmala Schmid, 1987^{i c g}
- Setodes niveogrammicus Schmid, 1987^{i c g}
- Setodes niveolineatus Kimmins, 1962^{i c g}
- Setodes njala Kimmins, 1962^{i c g}
- Setodes nyuna Schmid, 1987^{i c g}
- Setodes obscurus Schmid & Levanidova, 1986^{i c g}
- Setodes oligius (Ross, 1938)^{i c g}
- Setodes orthocladus Yang & Morse, 2000^{i c g}
- Setodes oxapius (Ross, 1938)^{i c g}
- Setodes paghbahani Mey, 1995^{i c g}
- Setodes pallidus Kimmins, 1963^{i c g}
- Setodes pandara Schmid, 1987^{i c g}
- Setodes papuanus Kimmins, 1962^{i c g}
- Setodes paribhuchita Schmid, 1987^{i c g}
- Setodes parichkrita Schmid, 1987^{i c g}
- Setodes parilaghu Schmid, 1987^{i c g}
- Setodes parisamchuddha Schmid, 1987^{i c g}
- Setodes pellucidulus Schmid, 1987^{i c g}
- Setodes peniculus Yang & Morse, 2000^{i c g}
- Setodes perpendicularis Chen & Morce^{g}
- Setodes platecladus Yang & Morse, 2000^{i c g}
- Setodes prabhatajalaja Schmid, 1987^{i c g}
- Setodes pratachandradynti Schmid, 1987^{i c g}
- Setodes priyadarcha Schmid, 1987^{i c g}
- Setodes puchkaraja Schmid, 1987^{i c g}
- Setodes pulcher Martynov, 1910^{i c g}
- Setodes punctatus (Fabricius, 1793)^{i c g}
- Setodes puruchringa Schmid, 1987^{i c g}
- Setodes quadratus Yang & Morse, 1989^{i c g}
- Setodes reclinatus Yang & Morse, 2000^{i c g}
- Setodes retinaculus Marlier, 1965^{i c g}
- Setodes sachrika Schmid, 1987^{i c g}
- Setodes salweenensis ^{g}
- Setodes samphulla Schmid, 1987^{i c g}
- Setodes samprabhinna Schmid, 1987^{i c g}
- Setodes sarvapunya Schmid, 1987^{i c g}
- Setodes satichaya Schmid, 1987^{i c g}
- Setodes savibhrama Schmid, 1987^{i c g}
- Setodes schmidi Yang & Morse, 1989^{i c g}
- Setodes scleroideus Yang & Morse, 2000^{i c g}
- Setodes shirasensis Kobayashi, 1984^{i c g}
- Setodes sinuatus Yang & Morse, 2000^{i c g}
- Setodes siribumrungsukhai ^{g}
- Setodes spineus Yang & Morse, 2000^{i c g}
- Setodes spinosellus Ulmer, 1930^{i c g}
- Setodes squamosus Mosely, 1931^{i c g}
- Setodes stehri (Ross, 1941)^{i c g}
- Setodes sternalis Martynov, 1936^{i c g}
- Setodes subhachita Schmid, 1987^{i c g}
- Setodes sucharu Schmid, 1987^{i c g}
- Setodes sugdeni Malicky, 1986^{i c g}
- Setodes supattra Schmid, 1987^{i c g}
- Setodes sypharus Yang & Morse, 2000^{i c g}
- Setodes tarpaka Gordon & Schmid, 1987^{i c g}
- Setodes tcharurupa Schmid, 1987^{i c g}
- Setodes tchaturdanta Schmid, 1987^{i c g}
- Setodes tectorius Yang & Morse, 2000^{i c g}
- Setodes tejasvin Schmid, 1987^{i c g}
- Setodes tenuifalcatus Martynov, 1936^{i c g}
- Setodes terminalis Banks, 1920^{i c g}
- Setodes tilakita Schmid, 1987^{i c g}
- Setodes transvaalensis (Jacquemart, 1963)^{i c g}
- Setodes tridanta Schmid, 1987^{i c g}
- Setodes trifidus Kimmins, 1957^{i c g}
- Setodes trikantayudha Schmid, 1987^{i c g}
- Setodes trilobatus Yang & Morse, 1989^{i c g}
- Setodes uchita Schmid, 1987^{i c g}
- Setodes uddharcha Schmid, 1987^{i c g}
- Setodes udghona Schmid, 1987^{i c g}
- Setodes ujiensis (Akagi, 1960)^{i c}
- Setodes uncinatus Ulmer, 1913^{i c g}
- Setodes urania Navas, 1916^{i c g}
- Setodes uttamavarna Schmid, 1987^{i c g}
- Setodes varians Yang & Morse, 2000^{i c g}
- Setodes vartianorum Malicky, 1986^{i c g}
- Setodes venustus Ulmer, 1951^{i c g}
- Setodes vichitrita Schmid, 1987^{i c g}
- Setodes viridellus Navás, 1932^{i c g}
- Setodes viridis (Fourcroy, 1785)^{i c g}
- Setodes vitanka Schmid, 1987^{i c g}
- Setodes vratachakora Schmid, 1987^{i c g}
- Setodes yatharupa Schmid, 1987^{i c g}
- Setodes yunnanensis Yang & Morse, 1989^{i c g}
- Setodes zerroukii Dakki, 1981^{i c g}

Data sources: i = ITIS, c = Catalogue of Life, g = GBIF, b = Bugguide.net
