= List of Leptocerus species =

This is a list of 120 species in Leptocerus, a genus of long-horned caddisflies in the family Leptoceridae.

== Leptocerus species ==
- Leptocerus agamemnon Malicky & Chantaramongkol, 1996^{i c g}
- Leptocerus agaue Malicky & Chantaramongkol, 1996^{i c g}
- Leptocerus agunachila Schmid, 1987^{i c g}
- Leptocerus akhunta Schmid, 1987^{i c g}
- Leptocerus allaeri Jacquemart, 1966^{i c g}
- Leptocerus americanus (Banks, 1899)^{i c g b}
- Leptocerus amoenus (Ulmer, 1951)^{i c g}
- Leptocerus amphioxus (Marlier, 1965)^{i c g}
- Leptocerus anakus Gibbs, 1973^{i c g}
- Leptocerus anchises Malicky, 1997^{i c g}
- Leptocerus ankuchagraha Schmid, 1987^{i c g}
- Leptocerus anuradha (Schmid, 1958)^{i c g}
- Leptocerus aprachasta Schmid, 1987^{i c g}
- Leptocerus argentoniger (Ulmer, 1915)^{i c g}
- Leptocerus assimulans (Ulmer, 1916)^{i c g}
- Leptocerus atidvaya Schmid, 1987^{i c g}
- Leptocerus atiraskrita Schmid, 1987^{i c g}
- Leptocerus atsou Schmid, 1987^{i c g}
- Leptocerus atyudatta Schmid, 1987^{i c g}
- Leptocerus australis (Marlier, 1965)^{i c g}
- Leptocerus bahuchaka Schmid, 1987^{i c g}
- Leptocerus bangsaenensis Malicky & Chantaramongkol, 1991^{i c g}
- Leptocerus bheriensis Malicky, 1993^{i c g}
- Leptocerus bifascipennis (Ulmer, 1930)^{i c g}
- Leptocerus bimaculatus (Martynov, 1936)^{i c g}
- Leptocerus bitaenianus Yang & Morse, 2000^{i c g}
- Leptocerus biwae (Tsuda, 1942)^{i c g}
- Leptocerus bosei Kimmins, 1963^{i c g}
- Leptocerus burmanus Kimmins, 1963^{i c g}
- Leptocerus canaliculatus (Ulmer, 1930)^{i c g}
- Leptocerus cauliculus Yang & Morse, 2000^{i c g}
- Leptocerus chaktika Schmid, 1987^{i c g}
- Leptocerus charopantaja Schmid, 1987^{i c g}
- Leptocerus chatadalaja Schmid, 1987^{i c g}
- Leptocerus cheesmanae Kimmins, 1962^{i c g}
- Leptocerus cherrensis Kimmins, 1963^{i c g}
- Leptocerus chiangmaiensis Malicky & Chantaramongkol, 1991^{i c g}
- Leptocerus chyamavadata Schmid, 1987^{i c g}
- Leptocerus ciconiae Malicky, 1993^{i c g}
- Leptocerus circumflexus Mey, 1998^{i c g}
- Leptocerus cirritus Yang & Morse, 2000^{i c g}
- Leptocerus clavatus Kimmins, 1961^{i c g}
- Leptocerus clinatus Yang & Morse, 2000^{i c g}
- Leptocerus colophallus Yang & Morse, 1997^{i c g}
- Leptocerus coulibalyi Gibon, 1992^{i c g}
- Leptocerus datrayukta Schmid, 1987^{i c g}
- Leptocerus debilis (Navás, 1931)^{i c g}
- Leptocerus dejouxi Gibon, 1984^{i c g}
- Leptocerus dicopennis (Hwang, 1958)^{i c g}
- Leptocerus didymatus (Barnard, 1934)^{i c g}
- Leptocerus diehli Malicky & Chantaramongkol, 1991^{i c g}
- Leptocerus dirghachuka Gordon & Schmid in Schmid, 1987^{i c g}
- Leptocerus foederatus (Ulmer, 1951)^{i c g}
- Leptocerus funasiensis Kobayashi, 1985^{i c g}
- Leptocerus gracilis (Ulmer, 1912)^{i c g}
- Leptocerus hamatus Yang & Morse, 2000^{i c g}
- Leptocerus inflatus Kimmins, 1962^{i c g}
- Leptocerus interruptus (Fabricius, 1775)^{i c g}
- Leptocerus inthanonensis Malicky & Chantaramongkol, 1991^{i c g}
- Leptocerus intricatus (Mosely, 1939)^{i c g}
- Leptocerus katakoroensis Gibon, 1986^{i c g}
- Leptocerus kchapavarna Schmid, 1987^{i c g}
- Leptocerus kritamukha Schmid, 1987^{i c g}
- Leptocerus lampunensis Malicky & Chantaramongkol, 1991^{i c g}
- Leptocerus lanzenbergeri Malicky & Chantaramongkol, 1991^{i c g}
- Leptocerus lauzannei Gibon, 1992^{i c g}
- Leptocerus longicornis Yang & Morse, 2000^{i c g}
- Leptocerus lusitanicus (McLachlan, 1884)^{i c g}
- Leptocerus madhyamika (Schmid, 1961)^{i c g}
- Leptocerus mahadbhuta Schmid, 1987^{i c g}
- Leptocerus mahasena (Schmid, 1958)^{i c g}
- Leptocerus mahawansa (Schmid, 1958)^{i c g}
- Leptocerus manichyana Schmid, 1987^{i c g}
- Leptocerus maroccanus Dakki, 1982^{i c g}
- Leptocerus masik Malicky, 1995^{i c g}
- Leptocerus mechakita Schmid, 1987^{i c g}
- Leptocerus mechavrichana Schmid, 1987^{i c g}
- Leptocerus merangirensis Malicky, 1993^{i c g}
- Leptocerus moselyi (Martynov, 1935)^{i c g}
- Leptocerus mubalei (Jacquemart, 1961)^{i c g}
- Leptocerus neavei (Mosely, 1932)^{i c g}
- Leptocerus ophiophagi Malicky, 1993^{i c g}
- Leptocerus ousta Schmid, 1987^{i c g}
- Leptocerus parakum Chantaramongkol & Malicky, 1986^{i c g}
- Leptocerus pekingensis (Ulmer, 1932)^{i c g}
- Leptocerus posticoides Malicky, 1995^{i c g}
- Leptocerus posticus (Banks, 1911)^{i c g}
- Leptocerus prithudhara Schmid, 1987^{i c g}
- Leptocerus promkutkaewi Malicky & Chantaramongkol, 1991^{i c g}
- Leptocerus quilleverei Gibon, 1984^{i c g}
- Leptocerus rectus Kimmins, 1956^{i c g}
- Leptocerus sadbhuta Schmid, 1987^{i c g}
- Leptocerus sakantaka Schmid, 1987^{i c g}
- Leptocerus samchita Schmid, 1987^{i c g}
- Leptocerus samnata Schmid, 1987^{i c g}
- Leptocerus sarchtika Schmid, 1987^{i c g}
- Leptocerus sechani Gibon, 1992^{i c g}
- Leptocerus senarius Yang & Morse, 2000^{i c g}
- Leptocerus sibuyanus Malicky, 1993^{i c g}
- Leptocerus similis (McLachlan, 1875)^{i c g}
- Leptocerus sinuosus Gibbs, 1973^{i c g}
- Leptocerus souta Mosely in Mosely & Kimmins, 1953^{i c g}
- Leptocerus speciosus Kimmins, 1956^{i c g}
- Leptocerus stephanei Gibon, 1992^{i c g}
- Leptocerus sudhara Schmid, 1987^{i c g}
- Leptocerus sukhabaddha Schmid, 1987^{i c g}
- Leptocerus suthepensis Malicky & Chantaramongkol, 1991^{i c g}
- Leptocerus sylvaticus Gibon, 1984^{i c g}
- Leptocerus taianae Gibon, 1992^{i c g}
- Leptocerus tayaledra Malicky, 1979^{i c g}
- Leptocerus telimelensis Gibon, 1992^{i c g}
- Leptocerus tineiformis Curtis, 1834^{i c g}
- Leptocerus tungyawensis Malicky & Chantaramongkol, 1991^{i c g}
- Leptocerus tursiops Malicky, 1979^{i c g}
- Leptocerus ukchatara Schmid, 1987^{i c g}
- Leptocerus ultimus Mey, 1998^{i c g}
- Leptocerus vakrita Schmid, 1987^{i c g}
- Leptocerus valvatus (Martynov, 1935)^{i c g}
- Leptocerus wangtakraiensis Malicky & Chantaramongkol, 1991^{i c g}
- Leptocerus wanleelagi Malicky & Chantaramongkol, 1991^{i c g}

Data sources: i = ITIS, c = Catalogue of Life, g = GBIF, b = Bugguide.net
