= Mystacides alafimbriatus =

Scientific classification
- Kingdom: Animalia
- Phylum: Arthropoda
- Clade: Pancrustacea
- Class: Insecta
- Order: Trichoptera
- Family: Leptoceridae
- Genus: Mystacides
- Species: M. alafimbriatus

Binomial name
- Mystacides alafimbriatus Hill-Griffin, 1912

Species of caddisfly

Mystacides alafimbriatus is a species of long-horned caddisfly in the family Leptoceridae. It is found in North America.
