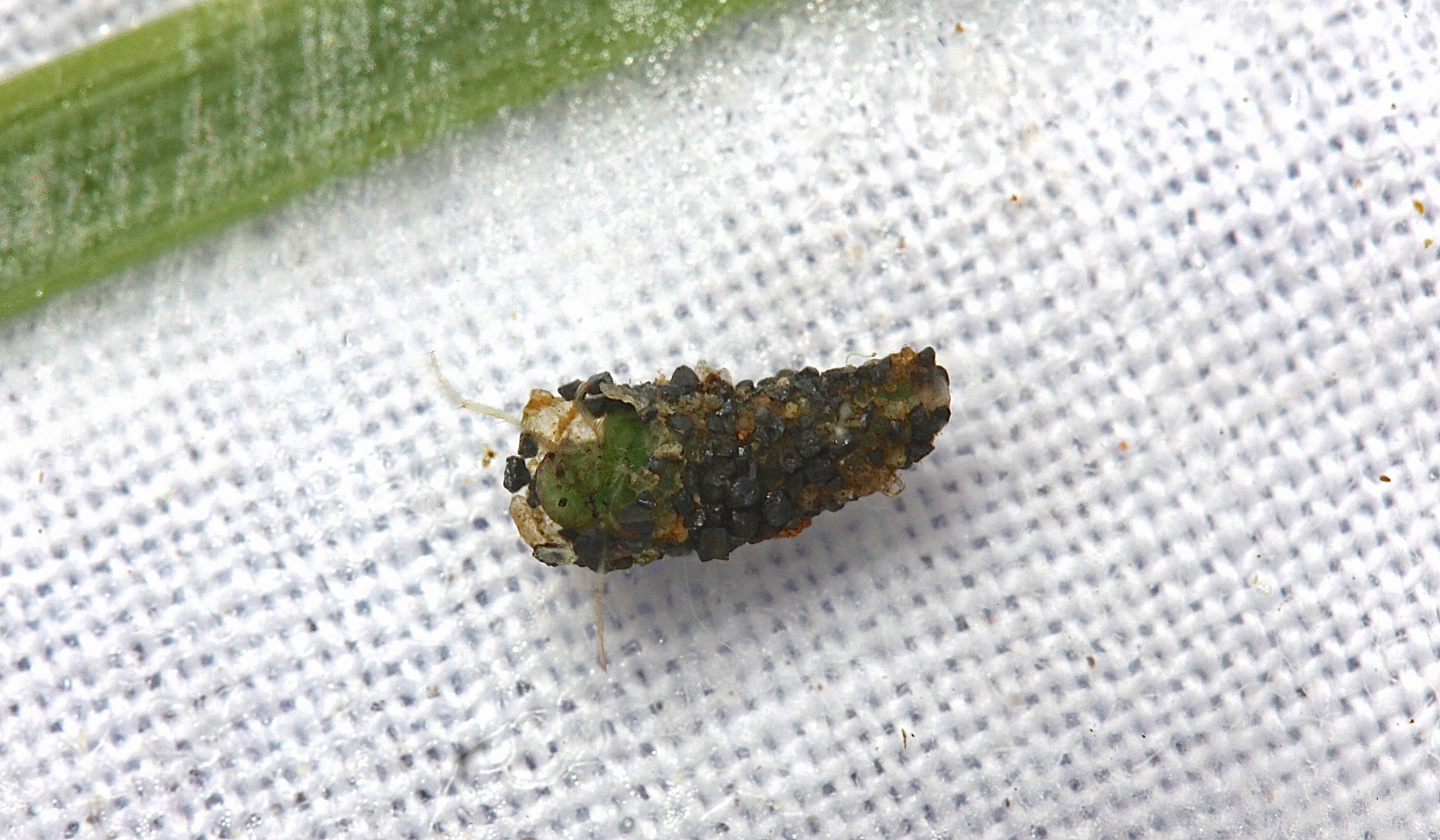
- Long-horned Caddisfly

Scientific classification
- Kingdom: Animalia
- Phylum: Arthropoda
- Clade: Pancrustacea
- Class: Insecta
- Order: Trichoptera
- Family: Leptoceridae
- Genus: Ceraclea
- Species: C. maculata

Binomial name
- Ceraclea maculata (Banks, 1899)

Synonyms
- Athripsodes inornatus (Banks, 1914); Leptocerus inornatus Banks, 1914; Leptocerus maculatus Banks, 1899

= Ceraclea maculata =

Species of caddisfly

Ceraclea maculata is a species of long-horned caddisfly in the family Leptoceridae. It is found in North America.
