= Triaenodes flavescens =

Scientific classification
- Kingdom: Animalia
- Phylum: Arthropoda
- Clade: Pancrustacea
- Class: Insecta
- Order: Trichoptera
- Family: Leptoceridae
- Genus: Triaenodes
- Species: T. flavescens

Binomial name
- Triaenodes flavescens Banks, 1900

Synonyms
- Triaenodes venustus Smith, 1900

Species of caddisfly

Triaenodes flavescens is a species of long-horned caddisfly in the family Leptoceridae. It is found in North America.
