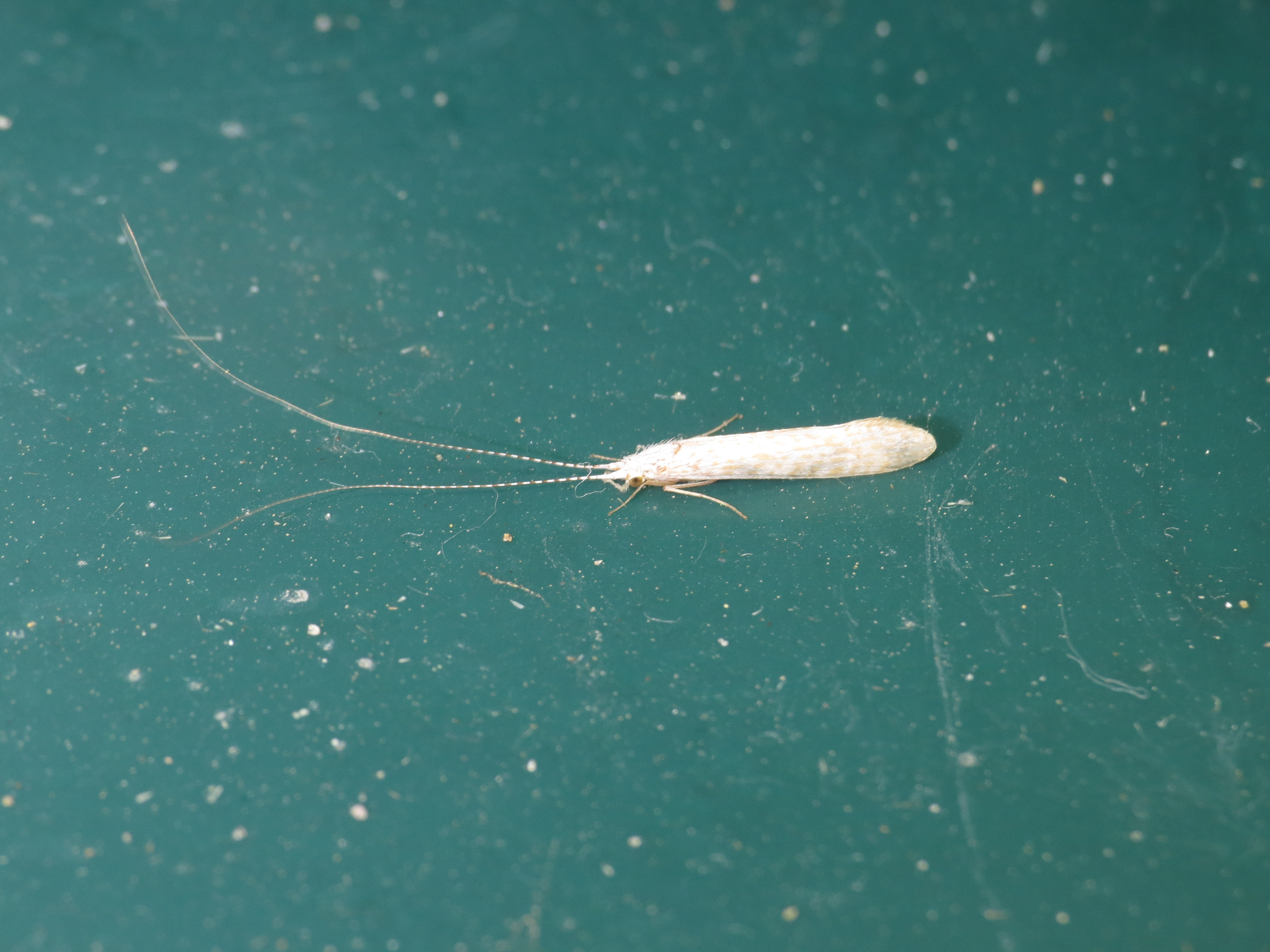

Scientific classification
- Kingdom: Animalia
- Phylum: Arthropoda
- Clade: Pancrustacea
- Class: Insecta
- Order: Trichoptera
- Family: Leptoceridae
- Genus: Nectopsyche
- Species: N. albida

Binomial name
- Nectopsyche albida (Walker, 1852)

Synonyms
- Leptocella uwarowii (Kolenati, 1859); Leptocerus albida Walker, 1852; Nectopsyche coloradensis (Banks, 1899); Setodes niveus Hagen, 1861

= Nectopsyche albida =

Species of caddisfly

Nectopsyche albida is a species of long-horned caddisfly in the family Leptoceridae. It is found in North America.
