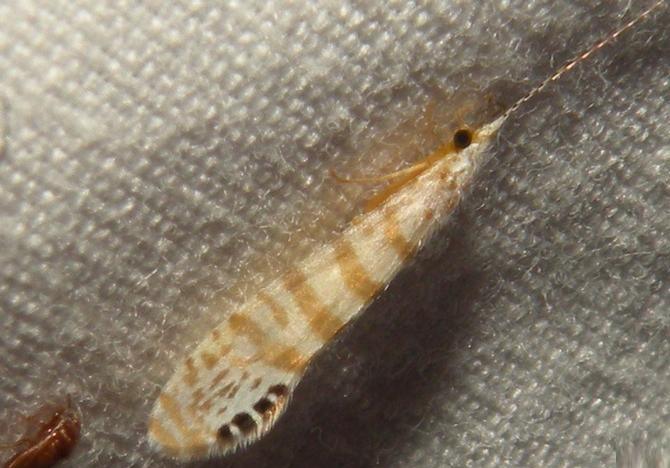

Scientific classification
- Kingdom: Animalia
- Phylum: Arthropoda
- Clade: Pancrustacea
- Class: Insecta
- Order: Trichoptera
- Family: Leptoceridae
- Genus: Nectopsyche
- Species: N. exquisita

Binomial name
- Nectopsyche exquisita (Walker, 1852)

Synonyms
- Nectopsyche piffardii (McLachlan, 1863); Setodes piffardii McLachlan, 1863

= Nectopsyche exquisita =

Species of caddisfly

Nectopsyche exquisita, or the exquisite long-horned caddisfly, is a species of long-horned caddisfly in the family Leptoceridae. It is found in North America.

== Description ==
Nectopsyche exquisita have a long and slender body, around 11-17mm in length, with antennae banded with white and brown. They have patterned yellow and white hairs along the wings with four black squares at the posterior margin.

== Range and habitat ==
Nectopsyche exquisita is most commonly found near slow moving water with aquatic plants in the eastern half of the United States and southeastern parts of Canada.
