= Leptocerus americanus =

Scientific classification
- Kingdom: Animalia
- Phylum: Arthropoda
- Clade: Pancrustacea
- Class: Insecta
- Order: Trichoptera
- Family: Leptoceridae
- Genus: Leptocerus
- Species: L. americanus

Binomial name
- Leptocerus americanus (Banks, 1899)

Synonyms
- Leptocerus grandis Banks, 1907; Setodes americana Banks, 1899

Species of caddisfly

Leptocerus americanus is a species of long-horned caddisfly in the family Leptoceridae. It is found in North America.
