= Setodes incertus =

Scientific classification
- Kingdom: Animalia
- Phylum: Arthropoda
- Class: Insecta
- Order: Trichoptera
- Family: Leptoceridae
- Genus: Setodes
- Species: S. incertus

Binomial name
- Setodes incertus (Walker, 1852)

Synonyms
- Leptocerus incertus Walker, 1852; Setodes autumnalis Banks, 1907; Setodes vernalis Banks, 1907

Species of caddisfly

Setodes incertus is a species of long-horned caddisfly in the family Leptoceridae. It is found in North America.
