= Ceraclea resurgens =

Scientific classification
- Kingdom: Animalia
- Phylum: Arthropoda
- Clade: Pancrustacea
- Class: Insecta
- Order: Trichoptera
- Family: Leptoceridae
- Genus: Ceraclea
- Species: C. resurgens

Binomial name
- Ceraclea resurgens (Walker, 1852)

Synonyms
- Athripsodes aspinosus (Betten, 1934); Athripsodes variegatus (Hagen, 1861); Leptocerus aspinosus Betten, 1934; Leptocerus resurgens Walker, 1852; Leptocerus variegatus Hagen, 1861

Species of caddisfly

Ceraclea resurgens is a species of long-horned caddisfly in the family Leptoceridae. It is found in North America.
