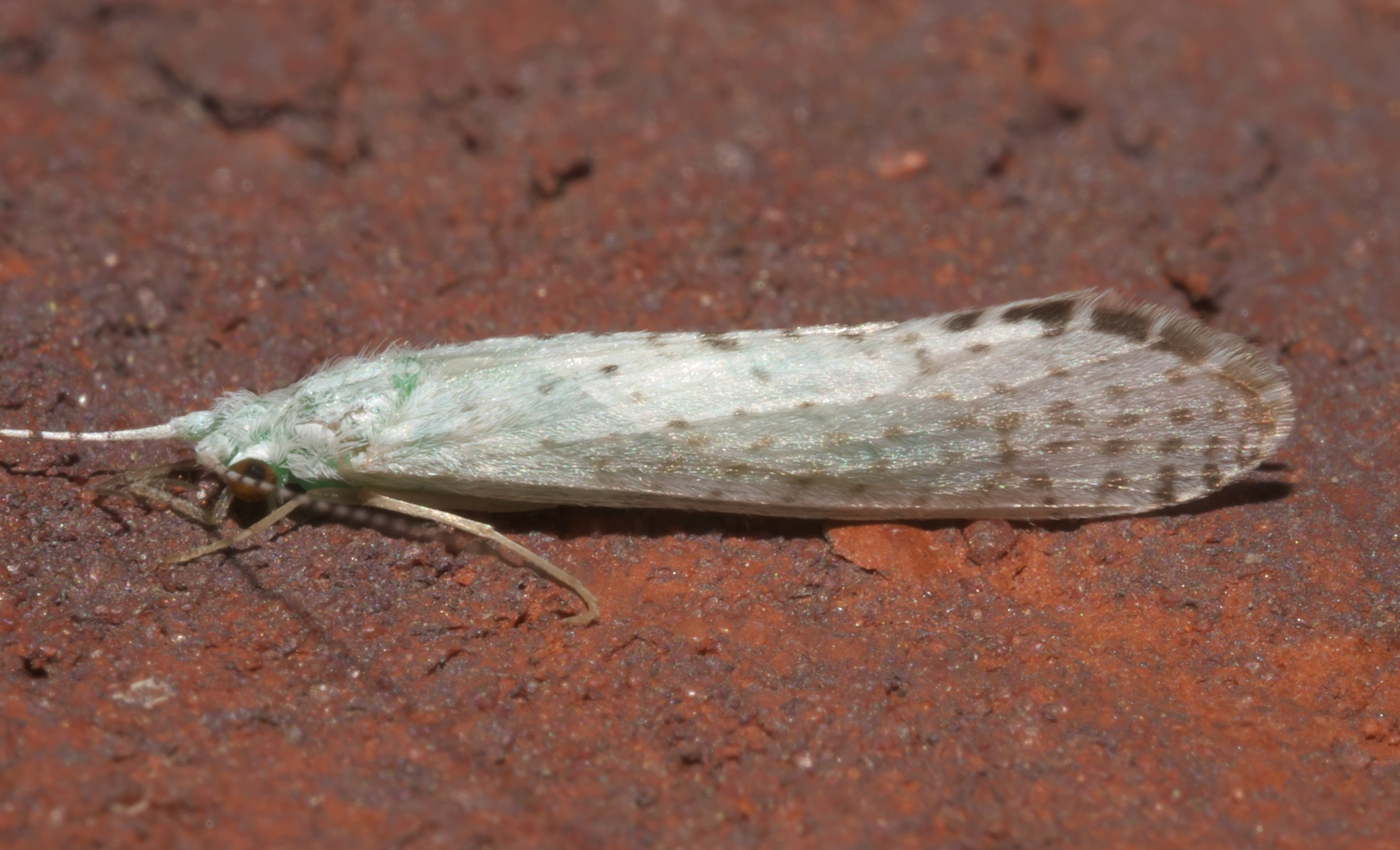
- Nectopsyche candida, Oklahoma

Scientific classification
- Kingdom: Animalia
- Phylum: Arthropoda
- Clade: Pancrustacea
- Class: Insecta
- Order: Trichoptera
- Family: Leptoceridae
- Genus: Nectopsyche
- Species: N. candida

Binomial name
- Nectopsyche candida (Hagen, 1861)

= Nectopsyche candida =

Species of caddisfly

Nectopsyche candida is a species of long-horned caddisfly in the family Leptoceridae. It is found in North America.
