= Ceraclea slossonae =

Scientific classification
- Kingdom: Animalia
- Phylum: Arthropoda
- Clade: Pancrustacea
- Class: Insecta
- Order: Trichoptera
- Family: Leptoceridae
- Genus: Ceraclea
- Species: C. slossonae

Binomial name
- Ceraclea slossonae (Banks, 1938)

Synonyms
- Athripsodes daggyi Denning, 1948; Ceraclea daggyi (Denning, 1948)

Species of caddisfly

Ceraclea slossonae is a species of long-horned caddisfly in the family Leptoceridae. It is found in North America.
