= Ceraclea transversa =

Scientific classification
- Kingdom: Animalia
- Phylum: Arthropoda
- Clade: Pancrustacea
- Class: Insecta
- Order: Trichoptera
- Family: Leptoceridae
- Genus: Ceraclea
- Species: C. transversa

Binomial name
- Ceraclea transversa (Hagen, 1861)

Synonyms
- Athripsodes angustus (Banks, 1914); Ceraclea angusta (Banks, 1914); Leptocerus angustus Banks, 1914; Leptocerus transversus Hagen, 1861

Species of caddisfly

Ceraclea transversa is a species of long-horned caddisfly in the family Leptoceridae. It is found in North America.
