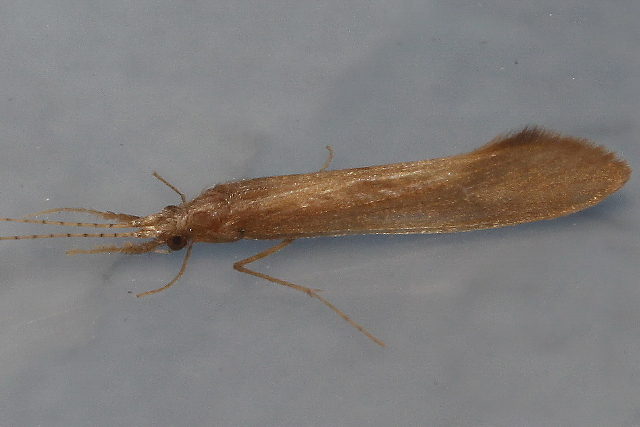

Scientific classification
- Kingdom: Animalia
- Phylum: Arthropoda
- Clade: Pancrustacea
- Class: Insecta
- Order: Trichoptera
- Family: Leptoceridae
- Genus: Triaenodes
- Species: T. baris

Binomial name
- Triaenodes baris Ross, 1938

= Triaenodes baris =

Species of caddisfly

Triaenodes baris is a species of long-horned caddisfly in the family Leptoceridae. It is found in North America.
