= Mystacides interjectus =

Scientific classification
- Kingdom: Animalia
- Phylum: Arthropoda
- Clade: Pancrustacea
- Class: Insecta
- Order: Trichoptera
- Family: Leptoceridae
- Genus: Mystacides
- Species: M. interjectus

Binomial name
- Mystacides interjectus (Banks, 1914)

Species of caddisfly

Mystacides interjectus is a species of long-horned caddisfly in the family Leptoceridae. It is found in North America.
