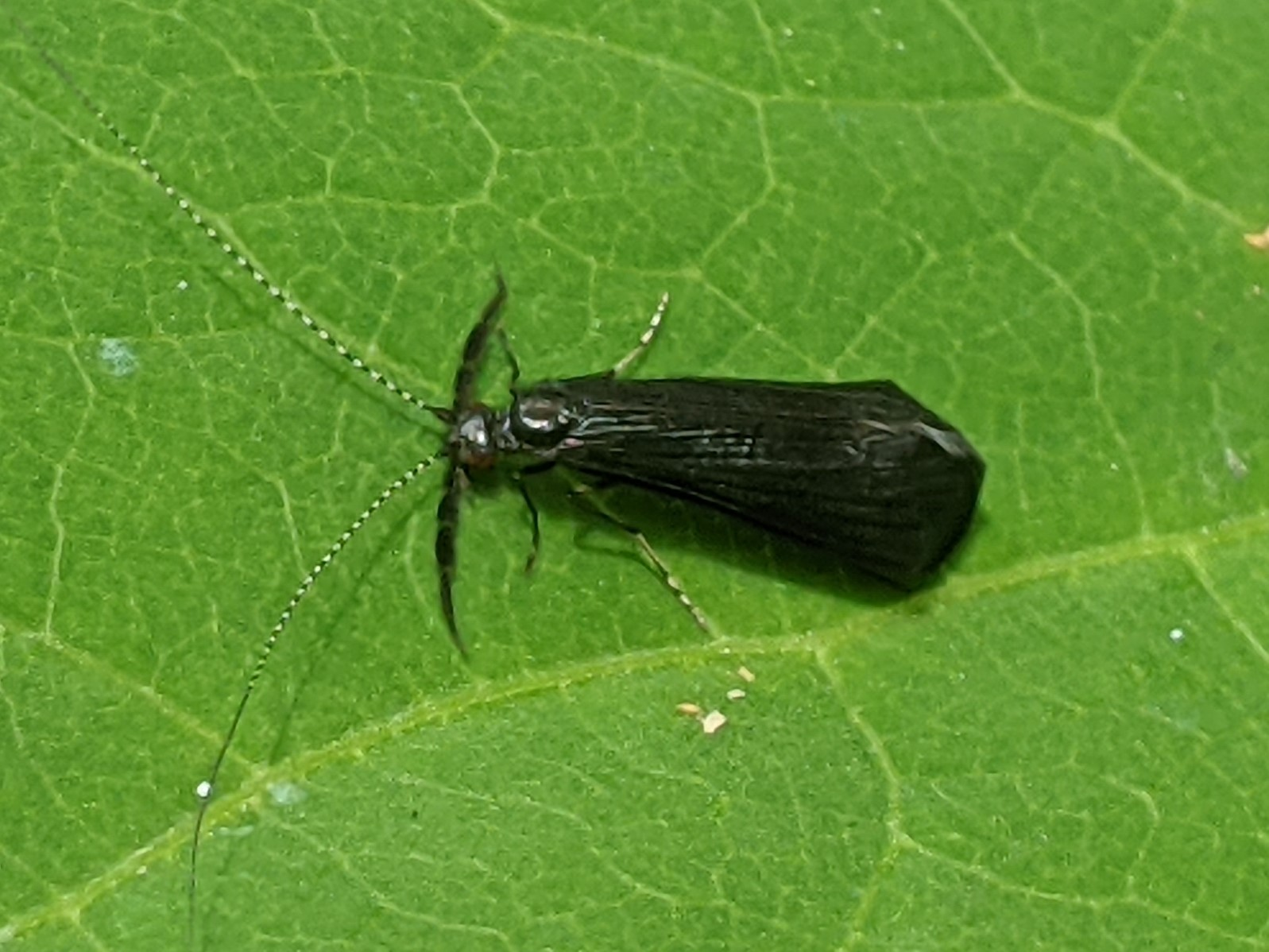

Scientific classification
- Kingdom: Animalia
- Phylum: Arthropoda
- Clade: Pancrustacea
- Class: Insecta
- Order: Trichoptera
- Family: Leptoceridae
- Genus: Mystacides
- Species: M. sepulchralis

Binomial name
- Mystacides sepulchralis (Walker, 1852)

Synonyms
- Leptocerus sepulchralis Walker, 1852

= Mystacides sepulchralis =

Species of caddisfly

Mystacides sepulchralis, the black dancer, is a species of long-horned caddisfly in the family Leptoceridae. It is found in North America.
