= Athripsodes =

Scientific classification
- Kingdom: Animalia
- Phylum: Arthropoda
- Clade: Pancrustacea
- Class: Insecta
- Order: Trichoptera
- Family: Leptoceridae
- Genus: Athripsodes; Billberg, 1820

Genus of caddisflies

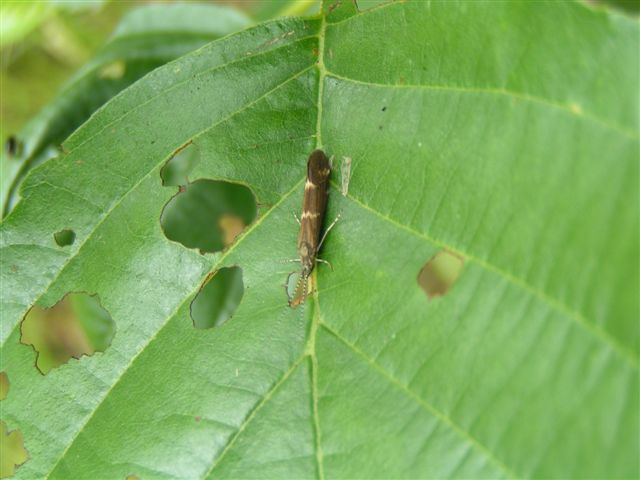

Athripsodes is a genus of insects in the family Leptoceridae.

The genus was described in 1820 by Gustaf Johan Billberg.

The genus has cosmopolitan distribution.

Species:

- Athripsodes albifrons (Linnaeus, 1758)
- Athripsodes amplexus (Barnard, 1934)
- Athripsodes angriamani Schmid, 1959
