= Erotesis =

Scientific classification
- Kingdom: Animalia
- Phylum: Arthropoda
- Clade: Pancrustacea
- Class: Insecta
- Order: Trichoptera
- Family: Leptoceridae
- Genus: Erotesis; McLachlan, 1877

Genus of caddisflies

Erotesis is a genus of insects belonging to the family Leptoceridae.

Species:

- Erotesis baltica
- Erotesis melanella
- Erotesis schachti
