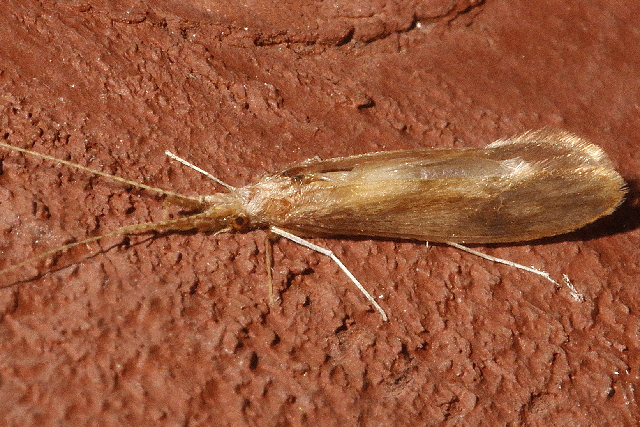

Scientific classification
- Kingdom: Animalia
- Phylum: Arthropoda
- Clade: Pancrustacea
- Class: Insecta
- Order: Trichoptera
- Family: Leptoceridae
- Genus: Triaenodes
- Species: T. tardus

Binomial name
- Triaenodes tardus Milne, 1934

Synonyms
- Triaenodes marginata tarda Milne, 1934; Triaenodes mephitus Milne, 1936

= Triaenodes tardus =

Species of caddisfly

Triaenodes tardus is a species of long-horned caddisfly in the family Leptoceridae. It is found in North America.
