= Ylodes =

Scientific classification
- Kingdom: Animalia
- Phylum: Arthropoda
- Clade: Pancrustacea
- Class: Insecta
- Order: Trichoptera
- Family: Leptoceridae
- Genus: Ylodes; Milne, 1934

Genus of caddisflies

Ylodes is a genus of caddisflies, belonging to the family Leptoceridae.

The genus was described in 1934 by Milne.

Species:

- Ylodes albicornis (Ulmer, 1905)
- Ylodes calcaratus (Martynov, 1928)
- Ylodes canus (Navas, 1933)
- Ylodes conspersus (Rambur, 1842)
- Ylodes detruncatus (Martynov, 1924)
- Ylodes frontalis (Banks, 1907)
- Ylodes internus (McLachlan, 1875)
- Ylodes jakutanus (Martynov, 1910)
- Ylodes kawraiskii (Martynov, 1909)
- Ylodes levanidovae Morse & Vshivkova, 1997
- Ylodes reuteri (McLachlan, 1880)
- Ylodes schmidi Manuel & Nimmo, 1984
- Ylodes simulans (Tjeder, 1929)
- Ylodes zarudnyi (Martynov, 1928)
