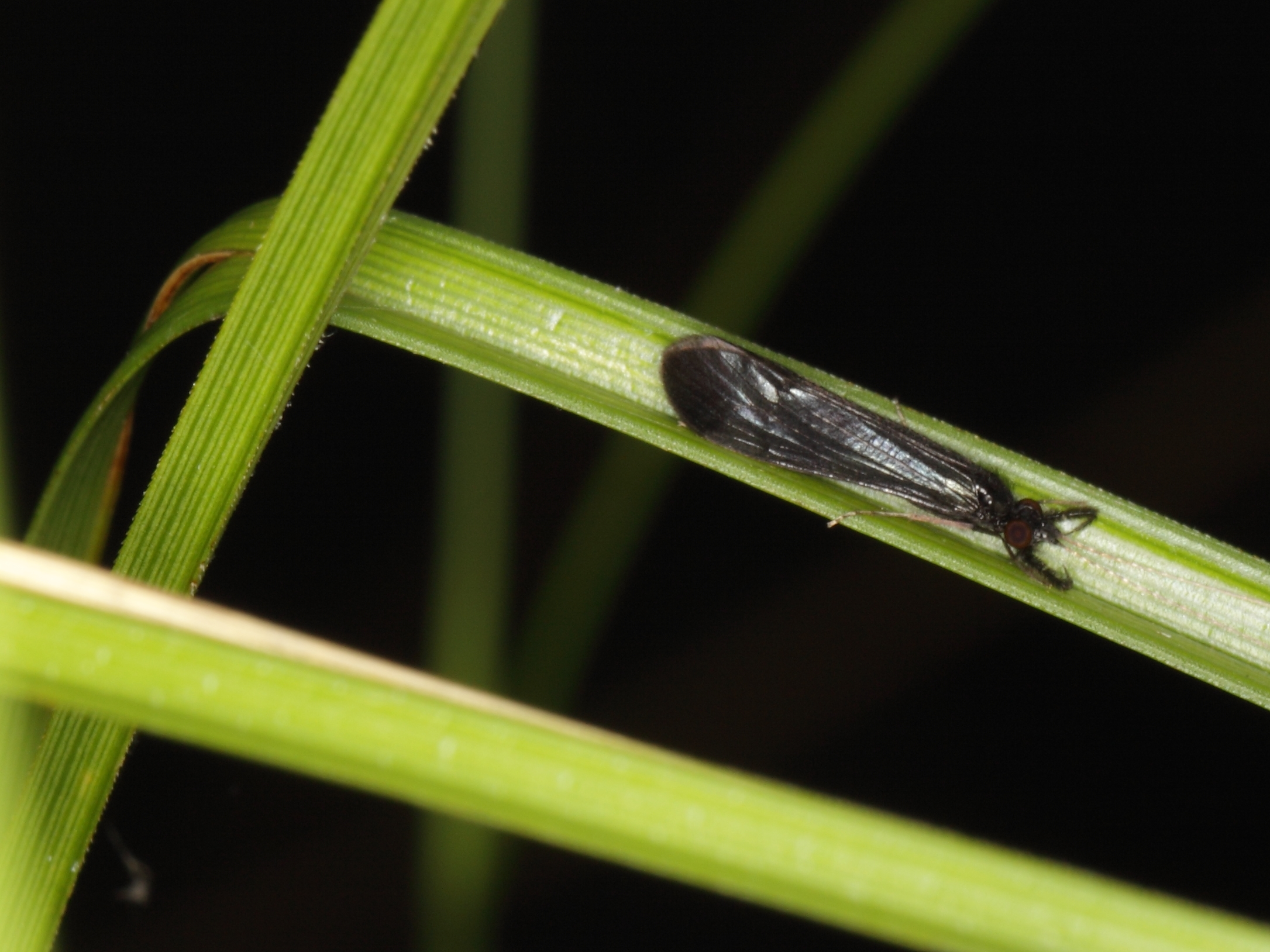

Scientific classification
- Kingdom: Animalia
- Phylum: Arthropoda
- Clade: Pancrustacea
- Class: Insecta
- Order: Trichoptera
- Family: Leptoceridae
- Genus: Mystacides; Berthold, 1827

= Mystacides =

Genus of caddisflies

Mystacides is a genus of long-horned caddisflies in the family Leptoceridae. There are more than 20 described species in Mystacides.

== Species ==
These 24 species belong to the genus Mystacides:

- Mystacides absimilis Yang & Morse, 1997
- Mystacides alafimbriatus Hill-Griffin, 1912
- Mystacides azureus (Linnaeus, 1761)
- Mystacides bifidus Martynov, 1924
- Mystacides concolor Burmeister, 1839
- Mystacides dentatus Martynov, 1924
- Mystacides elongatus Yamamoto & Ross, 1966
- Mystacides fennica Kolenati, 1858
- Mystacides indicus Martynov, 1936
- Mystacides interjectus (Banks, 1914)
- Mystacides khasicus Kimmins, 1963
- Mystacides leucopterus McLachlan, 1884
- Mystacides longicornis (Linnaeus, 1758)
- Mystacides monochrous McLachlan, 1880
- Mystacides niger (Linnaeus, 1758)
- Mystacides nigra (Linnaeus, 1758)
- Mystacides pacificus Mey, 1991
- Mystacides pristinus Yang & Morse, 2000
- Mystacides sandersoni Yamamoto & Ross, 1966
- Mystacides schmidi Yang & Morse
- Mystacides sepulchralis (Walker, 1852) (black dancer)
- Mystacides sibiricus Martynov, 1935
- Mystacides superatus Yang & Morse, 2000
- Mystacides testaceus Navás, 1931
