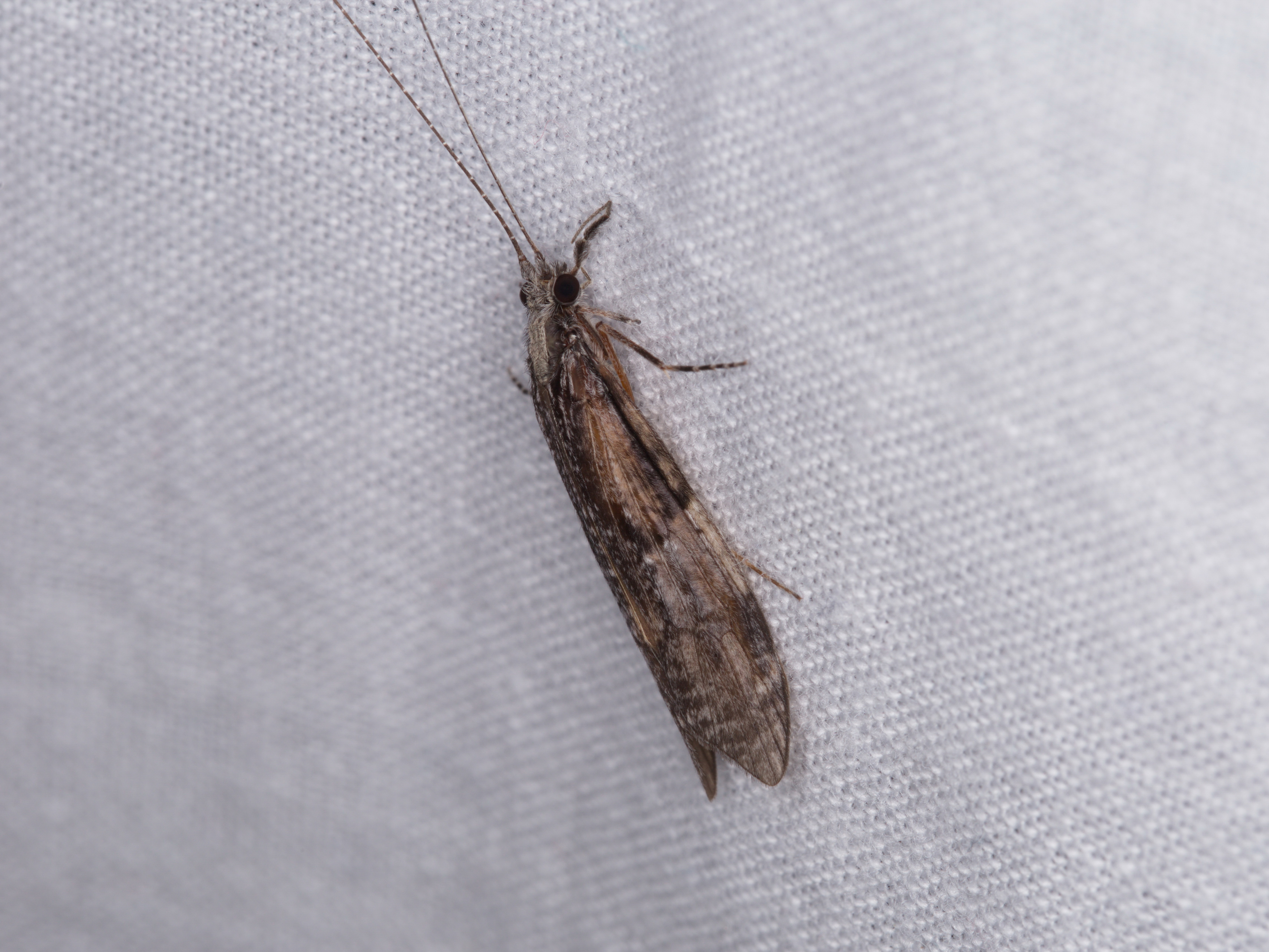
- Triplectides similis

Scientific classification
- Kingdom: Animalia
- Phylum: Arthropoda
- Clade: Pancrustacea
- Class: Insecta
- Order: Trichoptera
- Family: Leptoceridae
- Genus: Triplectides; Kolenati, 1859

Species
- See text

= Triplectides =

Genus of caddisfly

Triplectides is a genus of caddisfly (order Trichoptera). The genus is classified within the family Leptoceridae, commonly known as the long-horned caddisflies, because of their unusually long antennae as adults. Triplectides are also known as stick caddisflies because their aquatic larvae make protective mobile cases out of plant matter such as a hollow stem. Triplectides have a wide distribution, with an estimated 90 species globally. Their distribution is concentrated in the Southern Hemisphere, especially in Australasia, the Neotropical region, and the Oriental and East Palearctic regions of Asia.

== Taxonomy ==
The genus Triplectides was originally described by the Czech entomologist Friedrich Anton Kolenati in 1859. The genus Notanatolica which was established in 1866 by Robert McLachlan is now considered to be a historical synonym of Triplectides. The genus Triplectides is classified under subfamily Triplelectidinae, which included 14 genera in the past, however this has been narrowed down to 9 genera based on molecular data.

== Morphology ==
Triplectides are average to large relative to other caddisfly genera but there is still variation in size among the genus. In adults, there are species such as the T. magnus with forewing lengths as long as 18mm compared to smaller species such as T. nessimiani, with forewing lengths as short as 8.12mm. Adult colouration is also species-dependent, however it is typically shades of brown and grey. As members of family Leptoceridae, adults have exceptionally long antennae and an individual with a body length around 14mm may have antennae measuring around 29mm in length. Some species have been recorded to have sexually dimorphic features in terms of body size, wing size, wing venation, and genitalia.

Identifying individuals within genus Triplectides to the species-level may be difficult using morphology alone, as physical differences can be subtle. Similarly to other caddisfly genera, the main feature that can be used to differentiate species is male genitalia. Additionally, the number of tibial spurs and wing venation can be used to differentiate between some species. However, morphological data has its limitations, and molecular analysis is commonly used to differentiate between species.

Triplectides larvae can be easy to recognise when they occupy hollow stick fragments, however they have also been observed to use stones like other caddisfly genera. Many species have been observed to be highly opportunistic and use a variety of hollow objects as their cases. For example, a T. egleri larvae has been observed using a shrimp leg fragment as a case. Furthermore, larvae from many Triplectides species use unoccupied cases of other species, which can make species identification more difficult. In terms of their body, they often have distinctive dark banding in between their leg joints. Other distinctive larval features for most species is the presence of short antennae and long hind legs.

== Distribution ==
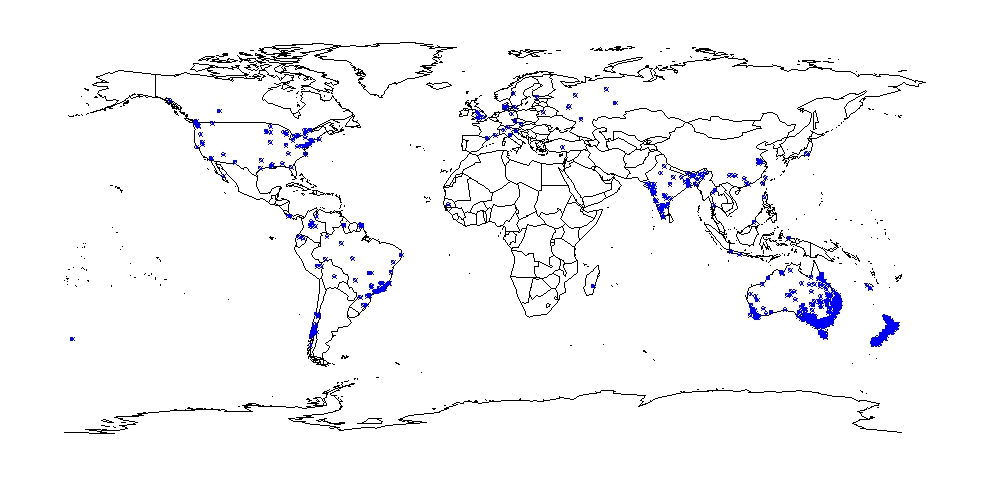
Global distribution of genus Triplectides. Distribution data from iNaturalist observations (Retrieved August 24, 2026). Plotted using RStudio and the mapdata package.

Triplectides is widespread across the Southern Hemisphere.

- Oceania:
  - Australia - 26 species are recognised, which are widespread across the country.
  - New Caledonia - There are 15 species recorded across the mainland, which is high diversity relative to the landmass.
  - New Zealand - 3 species (T. cephalotes,T. dolichos, and T. obsoletus) have been recorded.
- Central and South America:
  - Argentina - 5 species (T. chilensis T. gracilis,T. jaffueli,T. nigripennis and T. misionensis ) are present across different regions and climatic conditions.
  - Brazil - 7 new species were recently described in 2025, increasing the number of recognised species to 19 species.
  - Chile
  - Mexico
  - Paraguay
  - Peru
- Asia:
  - China - T. quadratus has been recorded.
  - India - T. indicus is present across West Bengal, Bihar, and Orissa.
  - Indonesia - T. indicus has been recorded in Java, Lombok, and Sumatra.
  - Japan - One species, T. misakianus, is present. This species inhabited lowland lentic habitats such as paddy fields and lakes in Kyushu and Honshu up until the 1950's. They were suspected to be extinct, however, they have been rediscovered in coastal wetlands in Honshu.

== Diversification ==
Caddisfly diversification originated around 295 million years ago (during the Permian period). Ecological innovations such as using plant matter to build larval cases occurred in some lineages, which coincided with the origin of family Leptoceridae around 120 million years ago (during the early Cretaceous period). The shift to inhabiting slow-moving freshwater environments (e.g. streams, lakes) led to further diversification. Four extinct Triplectides species have been discovered in Baltic amber and Rovno amber fossils which date back to the late Eocene around 35 million years ago.

== Lifecycle ==
Like all other caddisflies, Triplectides undergo complete metamorphosis (holometabolous) and have four distinct life stages including the egg, larval, pupal, and adult stages. Most Triplectides species, and caddisflies in general, are oviparous, meaning they lay eggs. Typically, globular egg masses are laid just above the water line.Triplectides is unique, and is the only known caddisfly genus that includes species that give live birth (viviparous). There are five viviparous species native to Australia which are: T. australis, T. helvolus, T. magnus, T. parvus, and T. volda. T. cephalotes, which are native to New Zealand, have also been recorded to give live birth to up to 600 larvae just below the water line.

== Habitat ==
Triplectides larvae live in a wide range of environments including both lentic and lotic conditions with pollution levels of unpolluted to moderately polluted. They play a key role in freshwater ecosystems as they are shredders that feed on and breakdown leaf detritus. Caddisfly larvae are often used for biomonitoring water quality. They are used as indicators in addition to mayflies (Ephemeropterea) and stoneflies (Plecoptera) as the basis of the EPT index. Triplectides larvae have a moderate tolerance to pollution and have a tolerance value of 5 to 5.7 (ranges from 0 to 10).

== Species ==
- Triplectides abnormalis Malm & Johanson, 2008
- Triplectides aequalichelatus Malm & Johanson, 2008
- Triplectides altenogus Morse & Neboiss, 1982
- Triplectides australicus Banks, 1939
- Triplectides australis Navás, 1934
- Triplectides bandeira Henriques-Oliveira, Nessimian, Takiya & Santos, 2025
- Triplectides bilobus Neboiss, 1977
- Triplectides caparaoensis Henriques-Oliveira, Nessimian, Takiya & Santos, 2025
- Triplectides cephalotes Walker, 1852
- Triplectides cerradoensis Henriques-Oliveira, Nessimian, Takiya & Santos, 2025
- Triplectides chilensis Holzenthal, 1988
- Triplectides cipo Henriques-Oliveira & Dumas, 2015
- Triplectides ciuskus Mosely, 1953
- Triplectides dawnae Malm & Johanson, 2008
- Triplectides deceptimagnus Yang & Morse, 2000
- Triplectides dolabratus Morse & Neboiss, 1982
- Triplectides dolichos McFarlane, 1981
- Triplectides egleri Sattler, 1963
- Triplectides elongatus Banks, 1939
- Triplectides enthesis Neboiss, 1982
- Triplectides flintorum Holzenthal, 1988
- Triplectides gonetalus Morse & Neboiss, 1982
- Triplectides gracilis Burmeister, 1839
- Triplectides hamatus Morse & Neboiss, 1982
- Triplectides helvolus Morse & Neboiss, 1982
- Triplectides iguassu Henriques-Oliveira, Nessimian, Takiya & Santos, 2025
- Triplectides indicus Walker, 1852
- Triplectides insperatus Morse & Neboiss, 1982
- Triplectides jaffueli Navás, 1918
- Triplectides koghiensis Malm & Johanson, 2008
- Triplectides liratellus Morse & Neboiss, 1982
- Triplectides liratus Morse & Neboiss, 1982
- Triplectides magnus Walker, 1852
- Triplectides mantiqueira Henriques-Oliveira, Nessimian, Takiya & Santos, 2025
- Triplectides maranhensis Desiderio, Barcelos-Silva & Pes 2017
- Triplectides mariannae Malm & Johanson, 2008
- Triplectides minutus Malm & Johanson, 2008
- Triplectides misionensis Holzenthal, 1988
- Triplectides misakianus Matsumura, 1931
- Triplectides mouiensis Malm & Johanson, 2008
- Triplectides nathaliae Malm & Johanson, 2008
- Triplectides neblinus Holzenthal, 1988
- Triplectides neotropicus Holzenthal, 1988
- Triplectides nessimian Desidério & Pes, 2020
- Triplectides nevadus Holzenthal, 1988
- Triplectides nigripennis Mosely, 1936
- Triplectides niveipennis Mosely, 1953
- Triplectides noumeiensis Malm & Johanson, 2008
- Triplectides obsoletus McLachlan, 1862
- Triplectides paragracilis Henriques-Oliveira, Nessimian, Takiya & Santos, 2025
- Triplectides parvus Banks, 1939
- Triplectides prolatus Morse & Neboiss, 1982
- Triplectides proximus Neboiss, 1977
- Triplectides puri Henriques-Oliveira, Nessimian, Takiya & Santos, 2025
- Triplectides qosqo Henriques-Oliveira & Dumas, 2015
- Triplectides quadratus Yang and Morse, 2000
- Triplectides rossi Morse & Neboiss, 1982
- Triplectides sasali Mary & Ward, 2001
- Triplectides similis Mosely, 1953
- Triplectides smithi Mary & Ward, 2001
- Triplectides tambina Mosely, 1953
- Triplectides tepui Holzenthal, 1988
- Triplectides tigrinus Malm & Johanson, 2008
- Triplectides truncatus Neboiss, 1977
- Triplectides ultimus Holzenthal, 1988
- Triplectides varius Kimmins, 1953
- Triplectides volda Mosely, 1953
- Triplectides wardi Malm & Johanson, 2008
- Triplectides winstanleyi Mary & Ward, 2001

Fossil species (extinct):

- Triplectides palaeoslavicus
- Triplectides patens
- Triplectides pellucens
- Triplectides rudis
