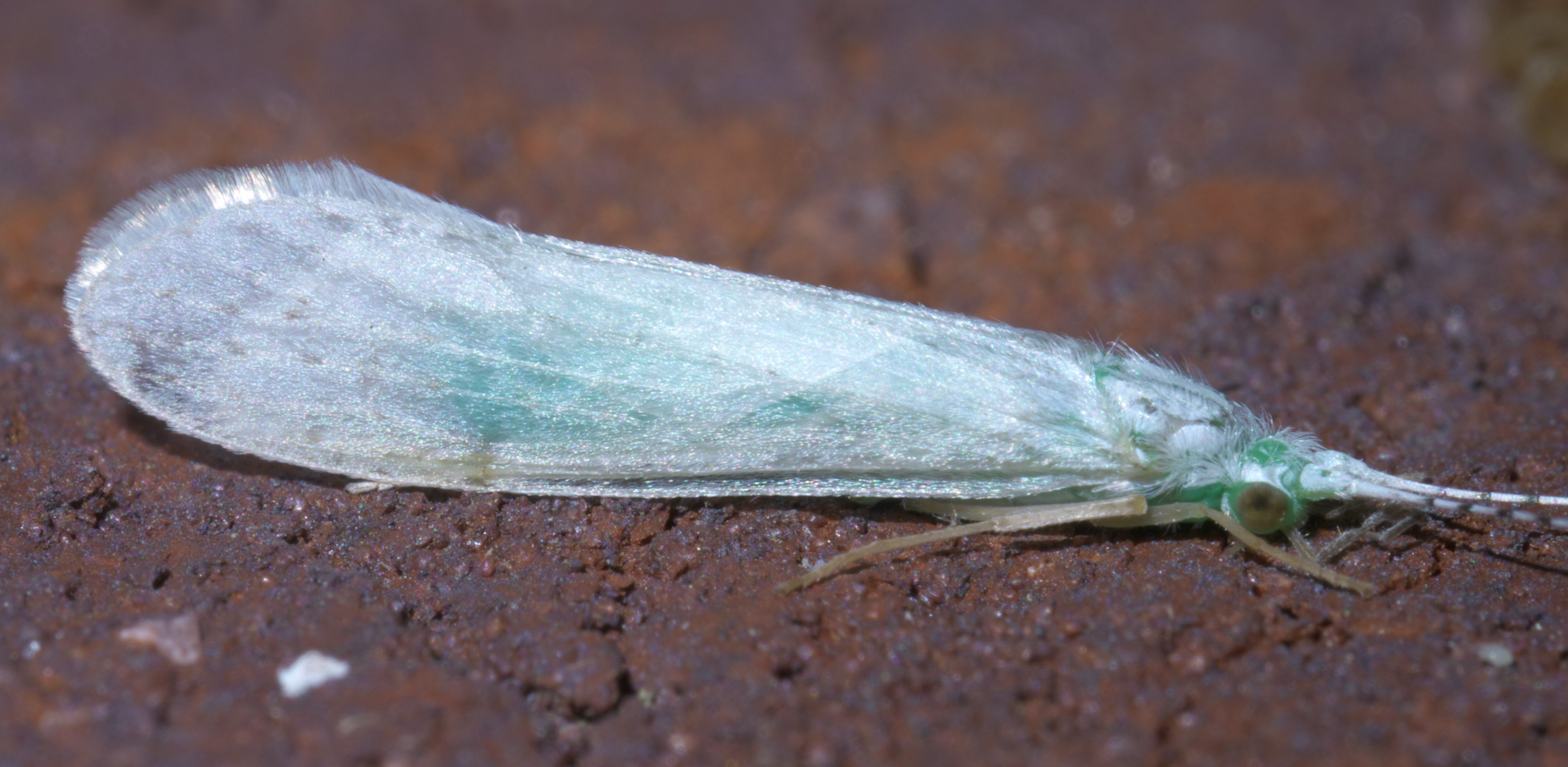

Scientific classification
- Kingdom: Animalia
- Phylum: Arthropoda
- Clade: Pancrustacea
- Class: Insecta
- Order: Trichoptera
- Family: Leptoceridae
- Genus: Nectopsyche; Mueller, 1879

Synonyms
- Leptocella Banks, 1899

= Nectopsyche =

Genus of caddisflies

Nectopsyche is a genus of white millers in the family Leptoceridae. There are at least 70 described species in Nectopsyche.

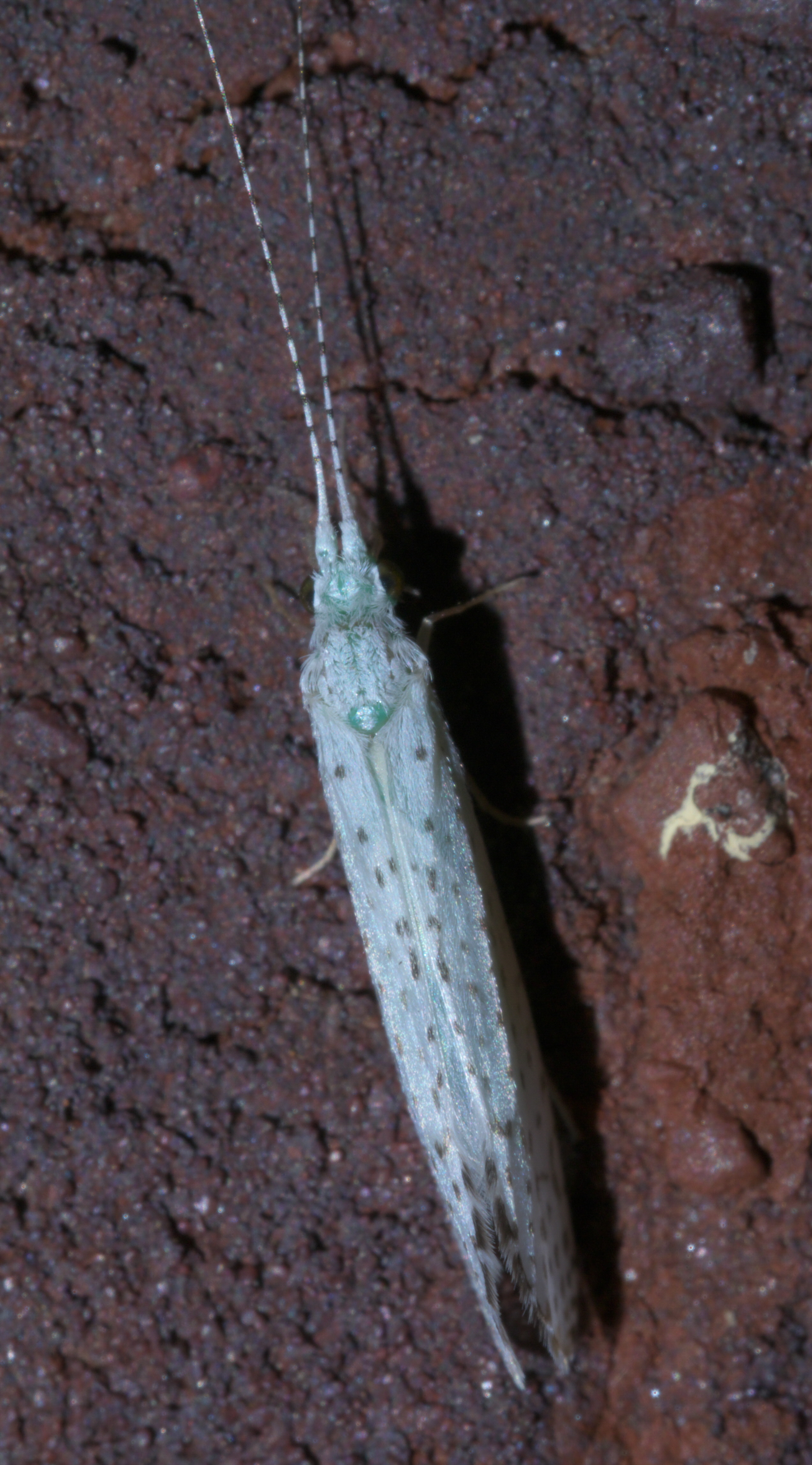
White millers, Nectopsyche

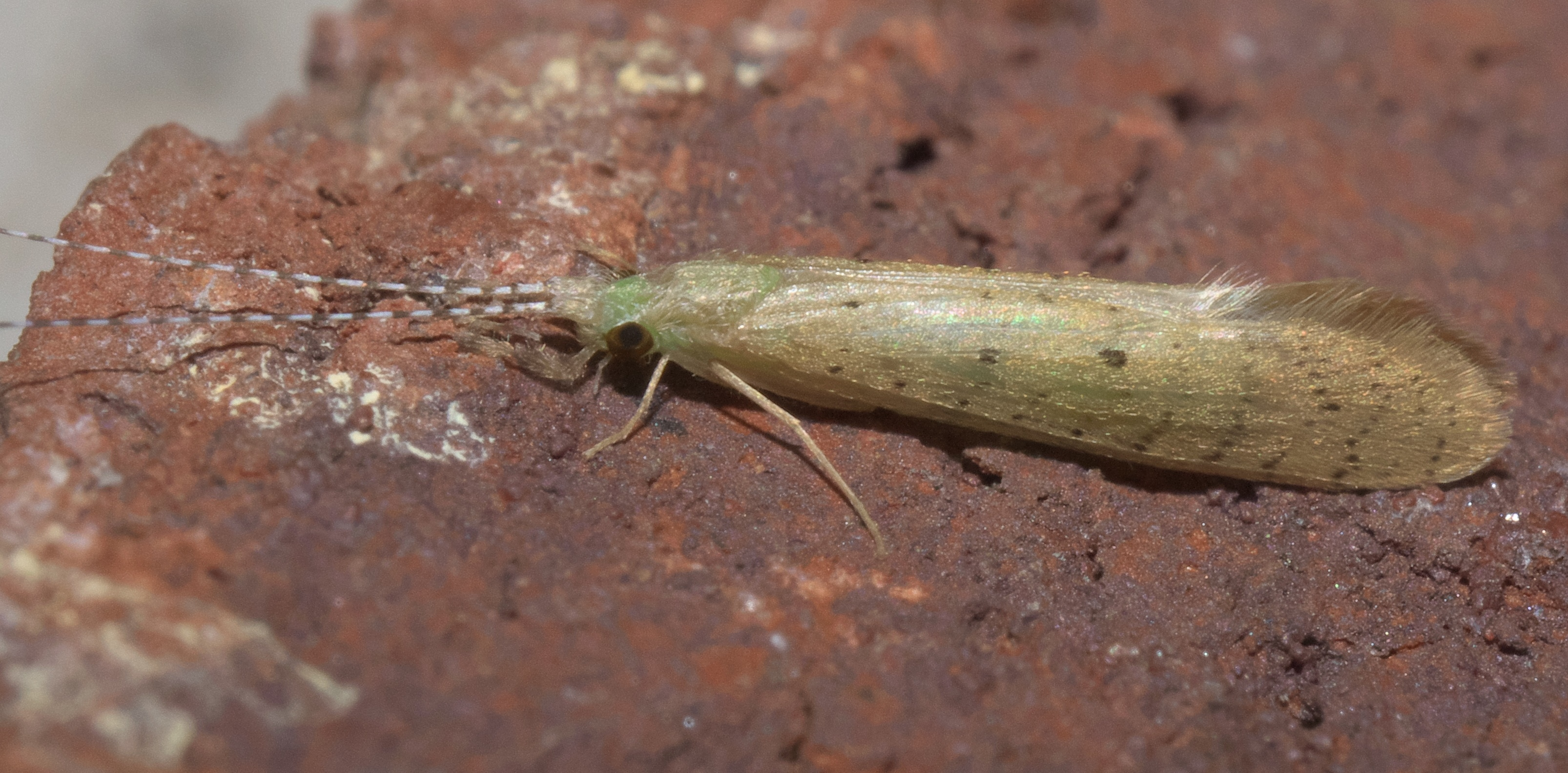
White millers, Nectopsyche

== Species ==
These 70 species belong to the genus Nectopsyche (not all listed below):

- Nectopsyche acutiloba Flint, 1974
- Nectopsyche adusta Flint, 1983
- Nectopsyche albida (Walker, 1852)
- Nectopsyche argentata Flint, 1991
- Nectopsyche aureofasciata Flint, 1981
- Nectopsyche aureovittata Flint, 1983
- Nectopsyche bellus (Mueller, 1921)
- Nectopsyche brethesi (Navas, 1920)
- Nectopsyche bruchi (Navas, 1920)
- Nectopsyche brunneofascia Flint, 1983
- Nectopsyche cana (Navas, 1924)
- Nectopsyche candida (Hagen, 1861)
- Nectopsyche cubana (Banks, 1938)
- Nectopsyche diarina (Ross, 1944)
- Nectopsyche diminuta (Banks, 1920)
- Nectopsyche dorsalis (Banks, 1901)
- Nectopsyche exophalma Holzenthal
- Nectopsyche exophthalma Holzenthal, 1995
- Nectopsyche exquisita (Walker, 1852)
- Nectopsyche flavofasciata (Ulmer, 1907)
- Nectopsyche fulva (Navás, 1930)
- Nectopsyche fuscomaculata Flint, 1983
- Nectopsyche gemma (Mueller, 1880)
- Nectopsyche gemmoides Flint, 1981
- Nectopsyche globigona Botosaneanu, 1998
- Nectopsyche gracilis (Banks, 1901)
- Nectopsyche jenseni (Ulmer, 1905)
- Nectopsyche lahontanensis Haddock, 1977
- Nectopsyche lewisi (Flint, 1968)
- Nectopsyche lucipeta (Navas, 1923)
- Nectopsyche maculipennis Flint, 1983
- Nectopsyche minuta (Banks, 1900)
- Nectopsyche modesta (Mueller, 1921)
- Nectopsyche monticola Holzenthal, 1995
- Nectopsyche mouticola Holzenthal
- Nectopsyche muelleri (Ulmer, 1905)
- Nectopsyche muhni (Navas, 1916)
- Nectopsyche multilineata Flint, 1983
- Nectopsyche navasi Holzenthal in Flint, Holzenthal & Harris, 2000
- Nectopsyche nigricapilla (Navas, 1920)
- Nectopsyche nordmani (Klingstedt, 1943)
- Nectopsyche onyx Holzenthal, 1995
- Nectopsyche ortizi Holzenthal, 1995
- Nectopsyche padrenavasi Holzenthal in Flint, Holzenthal & Harris, 2000
- Nectopsyche paludicola Harris, 1986
- Nectopsyche pantosticta Flint, 1983
- Nectopsyche pavida (Hagen, 1861)
- Nectopsyche punctata (Ulmer, 1905)
- Nectopsyche quatuorguttata (Navas, 1922)
- Nectopsyche separata (Banks, 1920)
- Nectopsyche spiloma (Ross, 1944)
- Nectopsyche splendida (Navas, 1917)
- Nectopsyche stigmatica (Banks, 1914)
- Nectopsyche taleola Flint, 1974
- Nectopsyche tapanti Holzenthal, 1995
- Nectopsyche tavara (Ross, 1944)
- Nectopsyche texana (Banks, 1905)
- Nectopsyche thallina (Navas, 1922)
- Nectopsyche tuanis Holzenthal, 1995
- Nectopsyche utleyorum Holzenthal, 1995
