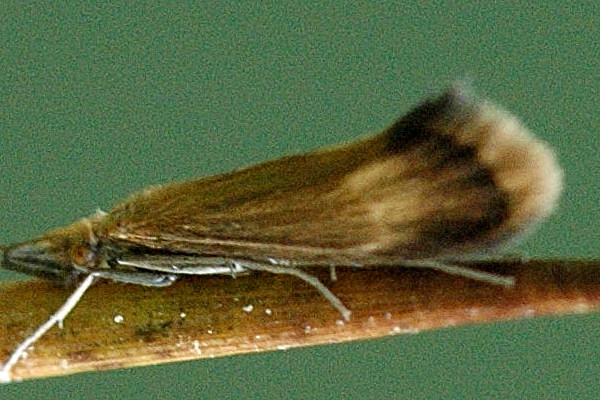
- Leptocerus interruptus

Scientific classification
- Kingdom: Animalia
- Phylum: Arthropoda
- Clade: Pancrustacea
- Class: Insecta
- Order: Trichoptera
- Family: Leptoceridae
- Genus: Leptocerus; Leach in Brewster, 1815

Diversity
- at least 140 species

= Leptocerus =

Genus of caddisflies

Leptocerus is a genus of long-horned caddisflies in the family Leptoceridae. There are more than 140 described species in Leptocerus.

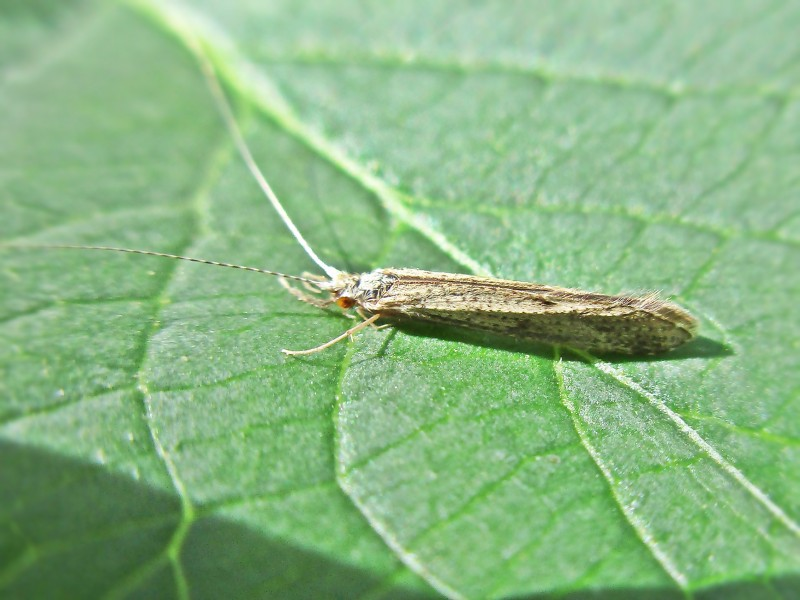
Leptocerus tineiformis

Larvae construct protective cases that differ between species.

== See also ==
- List of Leptocerus species
