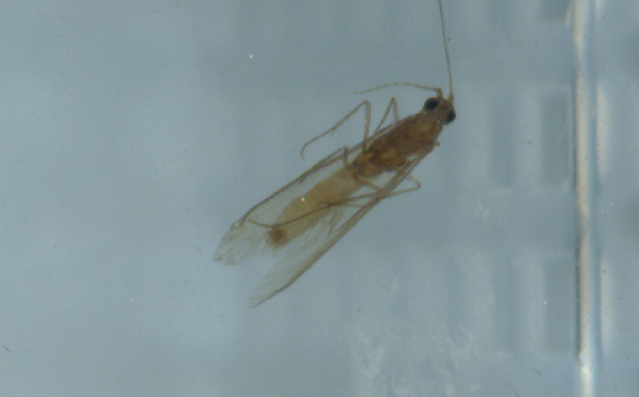

Scientific classification
- Kingdom: Animalia
- Phylum: Arthropoda
- Clade: Pancrustacea
- Class: Insecta
- Order: Trichoptera
- Family: Leptoceridae
- Genus: Setodes; Rambur, 1842

Diversity
- at least 230 species

= Setodes =

Genus of caddisflies

Setodes is a genus of long-horned caddisflies in the family Leptoceridae. There are at least 230 described species in Setodes.

== See also ==
- List of Setodes species
