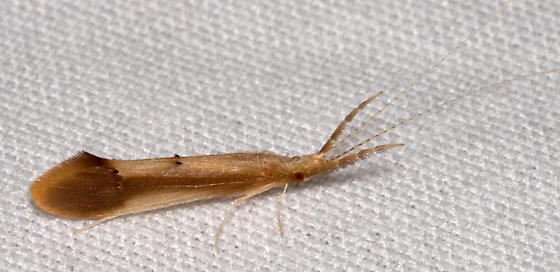

Scientific classification
- Kingdom: Animalia
- Phylum: Arthropoda
- Clade: Pancrustacea
- Class: Insecta
- Order: Trichoptera
- Family: Leptoceridae
- Subfamily: Leptocerinae
- Tribe: Triaenodini
- Genus: Triaenodes; McLachlan, 1865

= Triaenodes =

Genus of caddisflies

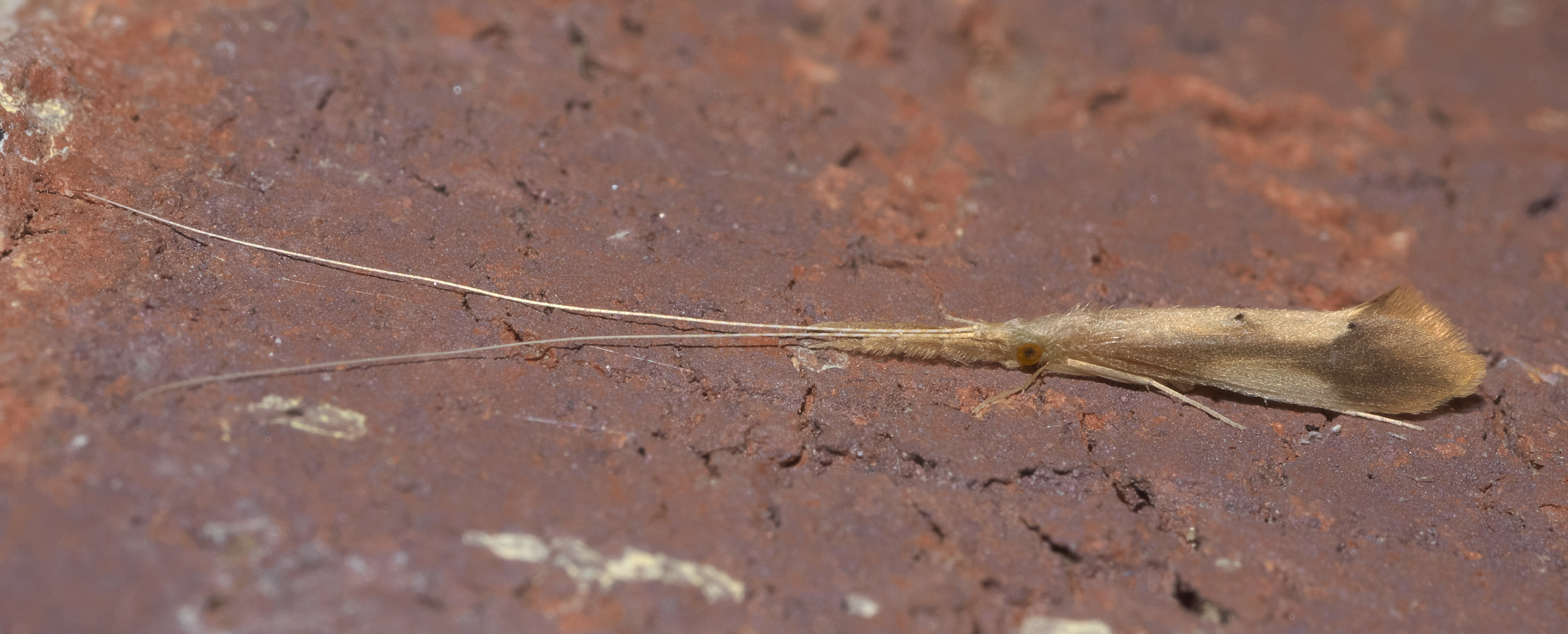

Triaenodes is a genus of long-horned caddisflies in the family Leptoceridae. There are at least 170 described species in Triaenodes.

The type species for Triaenodes is Leptocerus bicolor J. Curtis.

== See also ==
- List of Triaenodes species
