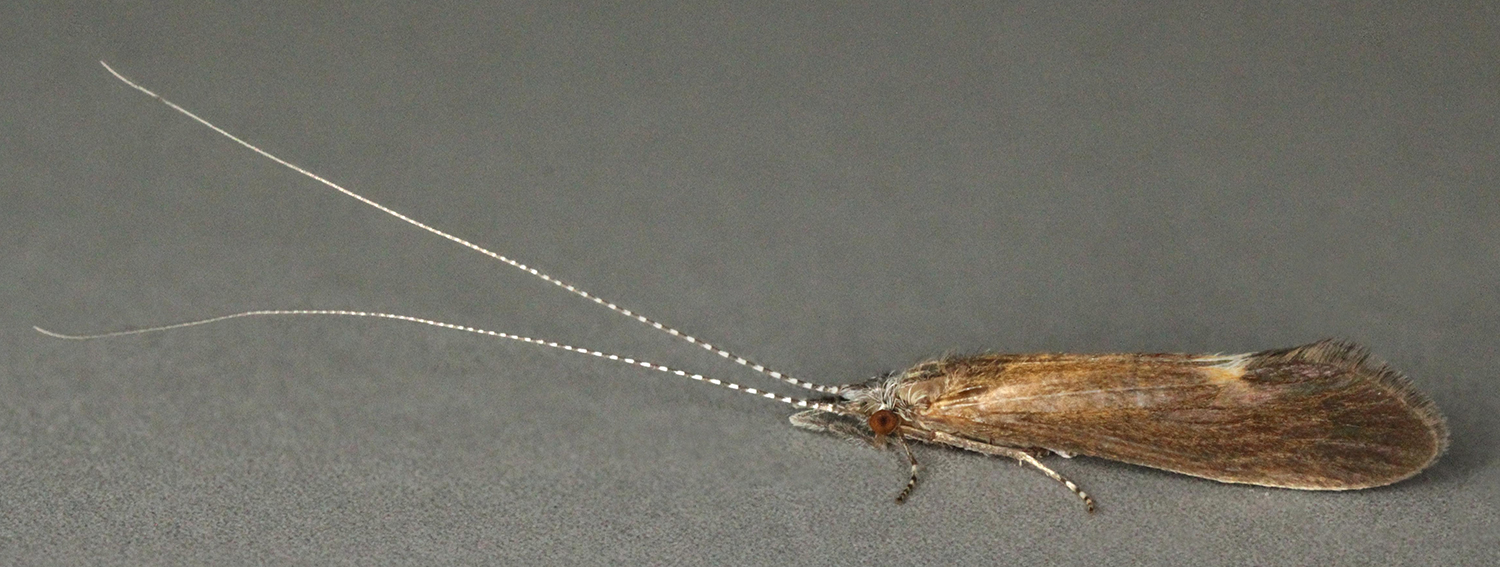
- Ceraclea dissimilis

Scientific classification
- Kingdom: Animalia
- Phylum: Arthropoda
- Clade: Pancrustacea
- Class: Insecta
- Order: Trichoptera
- Family: Leptoceridae
- Genus: Ceraclea; Stephens, 1829

Subgenera
- Ceraclea (Athripsodina) Kimmins, 1963; Ceraclea (Ceraclea) Stephens, 1829; Ceraclea (Pseudoleptocerus) Ulmer, 1907

Diversity
- at least 140 species

= Ceraclea =

Genus of caddisflies

Ceraclea is a genus of long-horned caddisflies in the family Leptoceridae. There are more than 140 described species in Ceraclea.

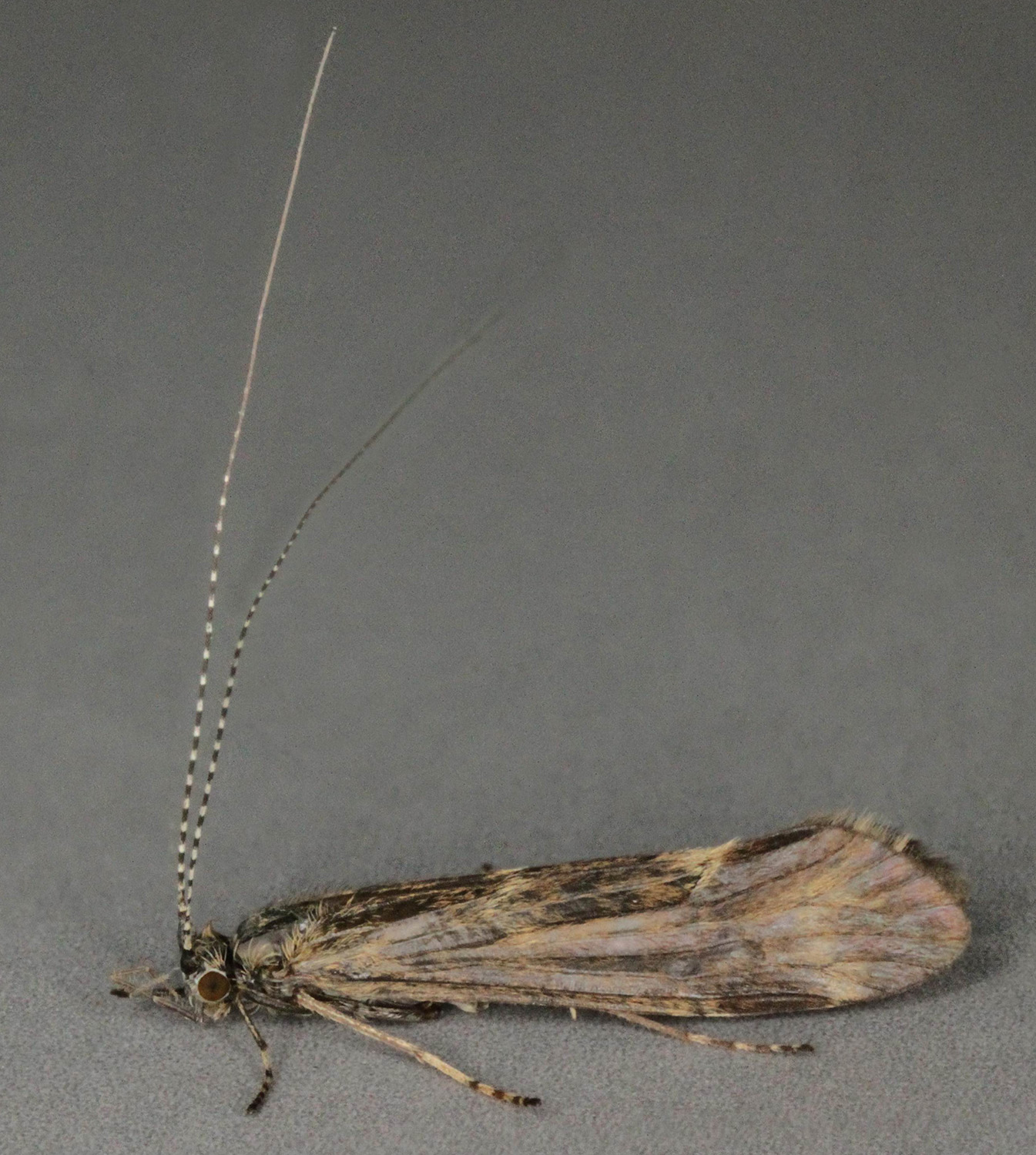
Ceraclea nigronervosa

== See also ==
- List of Ceraclea species
