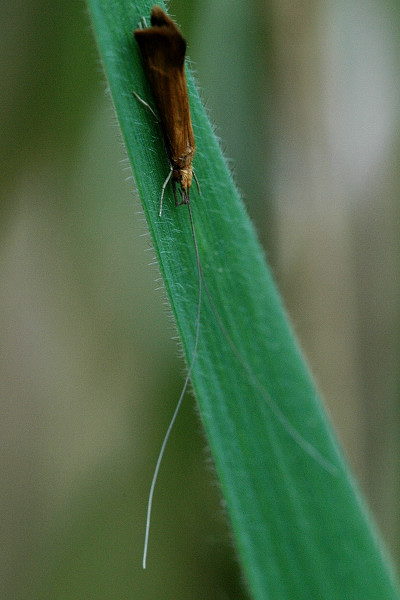
- Leptocerus interruptus

Scientific classification
- Kingdom: Animalia
- Phylum: Arthropoda
- Clade: Pancrustacea
- Class: Insecta
- Order: Trichoptera
- Superfamily: Leptoceroidea
- Family: Leptoceridae; Leach in Brewster, 1815

= Leptoceridae =

Family of caddisflies

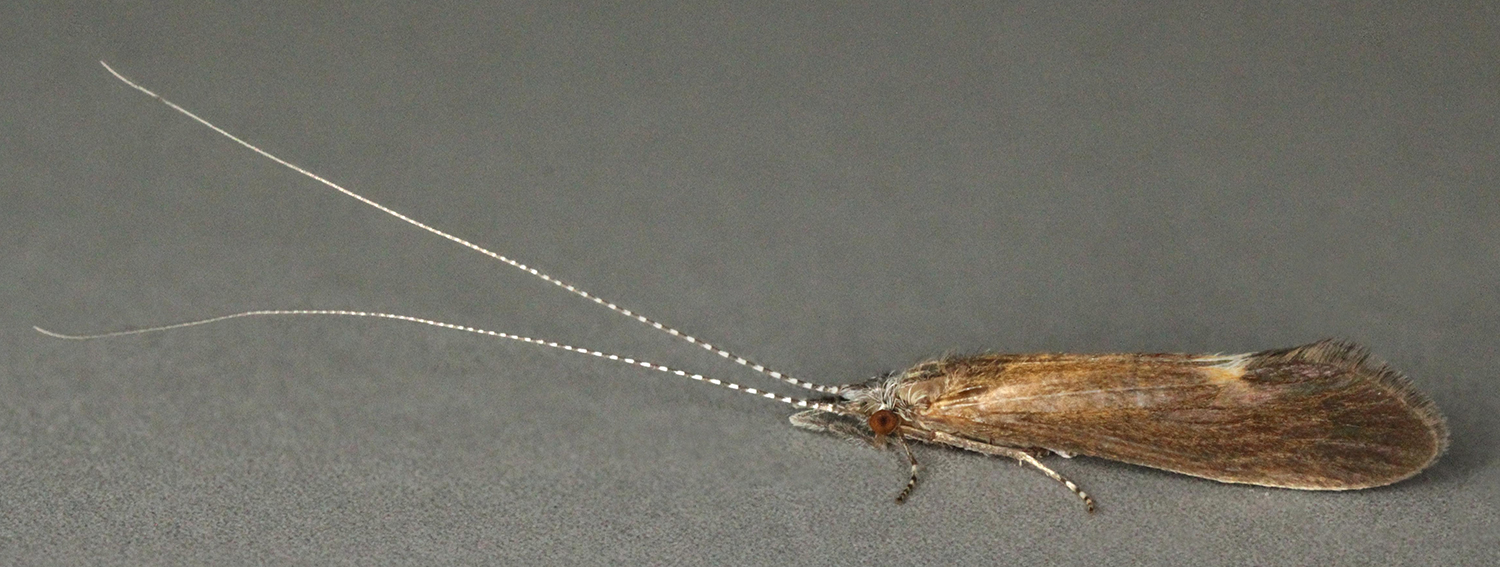
Ceraclea dissimilis

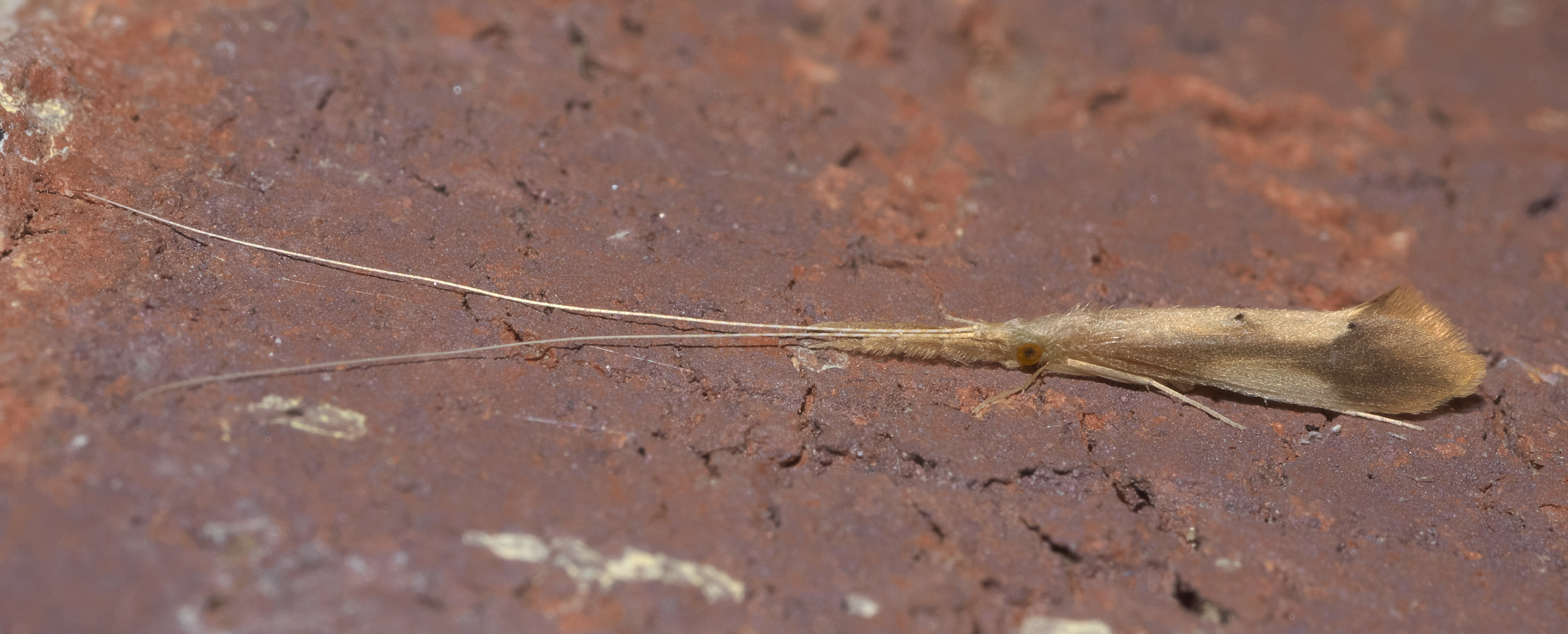
Triaenodes

The family Leptoceridae are a family of caddisflies often called "long-horned caddisflies" or "silverhorns". Leptoceridae is the second largest family of caddisflies with over 1850 species in approximately 68 genera. The main identifying feature of most Leptoceridae is that their antennae are much longer than those of other caddisflies. There is one genus with relatively short antennae (Ceraclea), but it is easily identified by the pair of dark curved lines on the mesonotum.

== Etymology ==
"Leptoceridae" comes from the Greek roots "leptos" and "keras", which means "slender" and "antenna".

== Larvae ==
=== Swimming ===
Leptoceridae larvae have dense swimming hairs and long hindlegs that protrude outside of their case, which enable them to be effective swimmers. Swimming allows the larvae to quickly move among aquatic vegetation in search of food or shelter. Larvae of one leptocerid, Triaenodes tardus, can swim continuously for up to six minutes.

=== Ecology ===
Leptocerid larvae exhibit a wide range of water quality tolerances and feed on a wide variety of foods, ranging from detritus and algal grazing to predation of freshwater sponges. Feeding guilds include scrapers, shredders, and predators. They occupy ponds, marshes, lakes, and the slower currents of streams, especially where aquatic plants are found. Specific habitat, water quality, and dietary requirements differ between species.

== Pupae ==
During the early stages of metamorphosis, pupating leptocerids shed the last layer of larval skin through their cases. Molannidae is the only other caddisfly family that does this.

== Adults ==
=== Description ===
Antennae are long (except Ceraclea), with males and females generally having antennae 2x and 1.5x the forewing length, respectively. Adults always have apical spurs, but no preapical spurs on the middle and hind tibia, and 0, 1, or 2 spurs on the front. Maxillary palps are long and five-segmented in both sexes. The wings are long and slender. The front- and hindwings are mechanically joined together by an arrangement of hairs.

=== Courtship and reproduction ===
Leptoceridae are unique among Trichoptera in having their fore- and hindwings highly synchronized during flight, which allow them to perform more acrobatic flights than other caddisflies. Male leptocerids form dense swarms over waterbodies to court females. Males can vary in body size and flight capability, which likely influences their reproductive success.

Leptoceridae perform three types of swarming flight patterns and pair formation behaviors. Male Athripsodes and Ceraclea fly in horizontal zigzag patterns over the surface of the water. Females fly into these swarms and are grabbed by the males midair, couple their genitalia, and continue flying while mating or carry their partner to nearby vegetation to finish copulating. Only the male use its wings; the female hangs upside-down from the coupling. Similarly, male Mystacides fly in vertical zigzag patterns over water and vegetation and grab approaching females. However, both partners use their wings to fly in tandem and do not couple their genitalia midair. They fly together to the shore to copulate. Male Triaenodes fly in a mixture of both horizontal and vertical zigzagging, where they search for females perched on aquatic plants. When a female is found, the male lands next to it and copulates while clinging to the plant for a long time.

These differences in flight patterns and pair formation behaviors correlate with three types of sexual dimorphism. Males of species that fly while copulating have longer forewings than their female partners. Males of the vertically zigzagging species have larger eyes, enabling them to more easily detect females that approach the swarm. Males of species that do not fly while copulating are much smaller than their female partners.

Most leptocerid females lay their eggs as a green gelatinous mass on the water's surface, although Nectopsyche deposit their eggs as strings. The eggs float on the surface until they swell with water and sink.

== Parasitism ==
Adult leptocerids are more commonly parasitized than other caddisfly families, possibly due to the unique presence of respiratory slits (serving as an opening) on their bodies. Aquatic mites of Hydracarina, Aturidae, and Pionidae, and Mermithidae nematodes have been found to parasitize adult Nectopsyche. Cypridae ostracods have been found to parasitize Nectopsyche larvae.

== Genera ==
The type genus for Leptoceridae is Leptocerus W.E. Leach, 1815.

These 68 genera belong to the family Leptoceridae (not all listed below):

- Achoropsyche Holzenthal, 1984^{i c g}
- Adicella McLachlan, 1877^{i c g}
- Amazonatolica Holzenthal & Pes, 2004^{g}
- Amphoropsyche Holzenthal, 1985^{i c g}
- Atanatolica Mosely, 1936^{i c g}
- Athripsodes Billberg, 1820^{i c g}
- Axiocerina Ross, 1957^{i c g}
- Blyzophilus Anderson, Kjaerandsen, & Morse, 1999^{i c g}
- Brachysetodes Schmid, 1955^{i c g}
- Ceraclea Stephens, 1829^{i c g b}
- Condocerus Neboiss, 1977^{i c g}
- Creterotesis Ivanov, 2006^{g}
- Erotesis McLachlan, 1877^{i c g}
- Fernandoschmidia Holzenthal & Andersen, 2007^{g}
- Gracilipsodes Sykora, 1967^{g}
- Grumichella Mueller, 1879^{i c g}
- Hemileptocerus Ulmer, 1922^{i c g}
- Homilia McLachlan, 1877^{i c g}
- Hudsonema Mosely, 1936^{i c g}
- Lectrides Mosely in Mosely & Kimmins, 1953^{i c g}
- Leptecho Barnard, 1934^{i c g}
- Leptoceriella Schmid, 1993^{i c g}
- Leptocerina Mosely, 1932^{i c g}
- Leptocerus Leach in Brewster, 1815^{i c g b}
- Leptorussa Mosely in Mosely & Kimmins, 1953^{i c g}
- Magadacerina Malm & Johanson, 2013^{g}
- Mystacides Berthold, 1827^{i c g b}
- Nectopsyche Mueller, 1879^{i c g b} (white millers)
- Neoathripsodes Holzenthal, 1989^{i c g}
- Nietnerella Kimmins, 1963^{i c g}
- Notalina Mosely, 1936^{i c g}
- Notoperata Neboiss, 1977^{i c g}
- Oecetis McLachlan, 1877^{i c g b}
- Parasetodes McLachlan, 1880^{i c g}
- Perissomyia Ulmer, 1912^{g}
- Poecilopsyche Schmid, 1968^{i c g}
- Praeathripsodes Botosaneanu & Wichard, 1983^{g}
- Ptochoecetis Ulmer, 1931^{i c g}
- Russobex StClair, 1988^{i c g}
- Sericodes Schmid, 1987^{i c g}
- Setodes Rambur, 1842^{i c g b}
- Symphitoneuria Ulmer, 1906^{i c g}
- Symphitoneurina Schmid, 1950^{i c}
- Tagalopsyche Banks, 1913^{i c g}
- Triaenodella Mosely, 1932^{g}
- Triaenodes McLachlan, 1865^{i c g b}
- Trichosetodes Ulmer, 1915^{i c g}
- Triplectides Kolenati, 1859^{i c g}
- Triplectidina Mosely, 1936^{i c g}
- Triplexa Mosely in Mosely & Kimmins, 1953^{i c g}
- Triplexina Mosely in Mosely & Kimmins, 1953^{i c g}
- Westriplectes Neboiss, 1977^{i c g}
- Ylodes Milne, 1934^{i c g}

Data sources: i = ITIS, c = Catalogue of Life, g = GBIF, b = Bugguide.net
