= List of Polycentropus species =

This is a list of 161 species in Polycentropus, a genus of tube maker caddisflies in the family Polycentropodidae.

== Polycentropus species ==
- Polycentropus acanthogaster Flint, 1981^{i c g}
- Polycentropus africanus Marlier, 1956^{i c g}
- Polycentropus alabamensis Hamilton, Harris & Lago, 1990^{i c g}
- Polycentropus alatus Flint, 1981^{i c g}
- Polycentropus albipunctus (Banks, 1930)^{i c g}
- Polycentropus almanzor Schmid, 1952^{i c g}
- Polycentropus altmani Yamamoto, 1967^{i c g}
- Polycentropus apsyrtos Malicky, 1999^{i c g}
- Polycentropus aquilonius Martynov, 1926^{i c g}
- Polycentropus ariensis Denning & Sykora, 1966^{i c g}
- Polycentropus arizonensis Banks, 1905^{i c g}
- Polycentropus armeniacus Martynov, 1934^{i c g}
- Polycentropus aspinosus Schmid, 1964^{i c g}
- Polycentropus auricollis Kimmins, 1962^{i c g}
- Polycentropus auriculatus Martynov, 1926^{i c g}
- Polycentropus australis Ulmer, 1915^{i c g}
- Polycentropus aztecus Flint, 1967^{i c g}
- Polycentropus azulus Flint, 1981^{i c g}
- Polycentropus barri Ross & Yamamoto^{i c g}
- Polycentropus bartolus Denning, 1962^{i c g}
- Polycentropus bellus Flint, 1981^{i c g}
- Polycentropus biappendiculatus Flint, 1974^{i c g}
- Polycentropus blicklei Ross & Yamamoto^{i c g}
- Polycentropus bonus Flint, 1981^{i c g}
- Polycentropus brevicornutus ^{g}
- Polycentropus brongus Gibbs, 1973^{i c g}
- Polycentropus carlsoni Morse, 1971^{i c g}
- Polycentropus carolinensis Banks, 1905^{i c g}
- Polycentropus casicus Denning in Denning & Sykora, 1966^{i c g}
- Polycentropus ceciliae Flint, 1991^{i c g}
- Polycentropus centralis Banks, 1914^{i c g}
- Polycentropus chelatus Ross & Yamamoto^{i c g}
- Polycentropus chellus Denning, 1964^{i c g}
- Polycentropus chilensis Yamamoto, 1966^{i c g}
- Polycentropus cianficconiae De Pietro, 2000^{i c g}
- Polycentropus clarus Flint, 1981^{i c g}
- Polycentropus colei Ross, 1941^{i c g}
- Polycentropus confusus Hagen, 1861^{i c g}
- Polycentropus connatus Flint, 1981^{i c g}
- Polycentropus corniger McLachlan, 1884^{i c g}
- Polycentropus corsicus Mosely, 1931^{i c g}
- Polycentropus costaricensis Flint, 1967^{i c g}
- Polycentropus cressae Hamilton & Holzenthal^{g}
- Polycentropus criollo Botosaneanu, 1980^{i c g}
- Polycentropus cuspidatus Flint, 1981^{i c g}
- Polycentropus deltoides Yamamoto, 1967^{i c g}
- Polycentropus denningi Smith, 1962^{i c g b}
- Polycentropus devetaki Krusnik & Malicky, 1992^{i c g}
- Polycentropus digitus Yamamoto, 1967^{i c g}
- Polycentropus divergens Mosely, 1930^{i c g}
- Polycentropus djaman Martynov, 1927^{i c g}
- Polycentropus domingensis Banks, 1941^{i c g}
- Polycentropus doronca Denning & Sykora, 1966^{i c g}
- Polycentropus drahamensis Malicky, 1982^{i c g}
- Polycentropus elarus Ross, 1944^{i c g}
- Polycentropus elegans Kumanski, 1979^{i c g}
- Polycentropus encera Denning, 1968^{i c g}
- Polycentropus excisus Klapalek, 1894^{i c g}
- Polycentropus exsertus Flint, 1981^{i c g}
- Polycentropus fasthi Holzenthal & Hamilton, 1988^{i c g}
- Polycentropus flavomaculatus (Pictet, 1834)^{i c g}
- Polycentropus flavostictus Hagen, 1865^{i c g}
- Polycentropus flavus ^{i c}
- Polycentropus floridensis Lago & Harris, 1983^{i c g}
- Polycentropus formosanus ^{g}
- Polycentropus fortispinus Holzenthal & Hamilton, 1988^{i c g}
- Polycentropus fortunus Flint, 1981^{i c g}
- Polycentropus francavillensis Malicky, 1981^{i c g}
- Polycentropus gertschi Denning, 1950^{i c g}
- Polycentropus grandis Kimmins, 1962^{i c g}
- Polycentropus guatemalensis Flint, 1967^{i c g}
- Polycentropus halidus Milne, 1936^{i c g}
- Polycentropus hamiferus Flint, 1981^{i c g}
- Polycentropus harpi Moulton & Stewart, 1993^{i c g}
- Polycentropus hebraeus Botosaneanu & Gasith, 1971^{i c g}
- Polycentropus holzenthali Bueno-Soria & Hamilton, 1986^{i c g}
- Polycentropus ichnusa Malicky, 1974^{i c g}
- Polycentropus iculus Ross, 1941^{i c g}
- Polycentropus ierapetra Malicky, 1972^{i c g}
- Polycentropus inaequalis ^{g}
- Polycentropus insularis Banks, 1938^{i c g}
- Polycentropus interruptus (Banks, 1914)^{i c}
- Polycentropus intricatus Morton, 1910^{i c g}
- Polycentropus jamaicensis Flint, 1968^{i c g}
- Polycentropus jeldesi Flint, 1976^{i c g}
- Polycentropus jenula Denning in Denning & Sykora, 1966^{i c g}
- Polycentropus joergenseni Ulmer, 1909^{i c g}
- Polycentropus kapchajalaja Schmid, 1975^{i c g}
- Polycentropus kenampi (Korboot, 1964)^{i c g}
- Polycentropus kingi McLachlan, 1881^{i c g}
- Polycentropus lepidius Navas, 1920^{i c g}
- Polycentropus lingulatus Flint, 1981^{i c g}
- Polycentropus longispinosus Schmid, 1958^{i c g}
- Polycentropus maculatus Banks, 1908^{i c g b}
- Polycentropus malickyi Moretti, 1981^{i c g}
- Polycentropus marcanoi Flint, 1976^{i c g}
- Polycentropus masi Navas, 1916^{i c g}
- Polycentropus mathisi Hamilton, 1986^{i c g}
- Polycentropus mayanus Flint, 1981^{i c g}
- Polycentropus mazdacus Schmid, 1959^{i c g}
- Polycentropus meridiensis Flint, 1981^{i c g}
- Polycentropus metirensis Malicky, 1982^{i c g}
- Polycentropus mexicanus (Banks, 1901)^{i c g}
- Polycentropus milaca Etnier, 1968^{i c g}
- Polycentropus milikuri Malicky, 1975^{i c g}
- Polycentropus morettii Malicky, 1977^{i c g}
- Polycentropus mortoni Mosely, 1930^{i c g}
- Polycentropus moselyi Kimmins, 1962^{i c g}
- Polycentropus mounthageni Kumanski, 1979^{i c g}
- Polycentropus nascotius Ross, 1941^{i c g}
- Polycentropus nebulosus Holzenthal & Hamilton, 1988^{i c g}
- Polycentropus neiswanderi Ross, 1947^{i c g}
- Polycentropus nigriceps Banks, 1938^{i c g}
- Polycentropus nigrospinus Hsu & Chen, 1996^{i c g}
- Polycentropus obtusus (Schmid, 1955)^{i c g}
- Polycentropus palmitus Flint, 1967^{i c g}
- Polycentropus pentus Ross, 1941^{i c g}
- Polycentropus picana Ross, 1947^{i c g}
- Polycentropus piceus Kimmins, 1962^{i c g}
- Polycentropus pilosa ^{g}
- Polycentropus pirisinui Malicky, 1981^{i c g}
- Polycentropus pixi Ross, 1944^{i c g}
- Polycentropus plicatus Navas, 1916^{i c g}
- Polycentropus quadriappendiculatus Schmid, 1964^{i c g}
- Polycentropus quadrispinosus Schmid, 1964^{i c g}
- Polycentropus radaukles Malicky, 1977^{i c g}
- Polycentropus rickeri Yamamoto, 1966^{i c g}
- Polycentropus rosselinus Navas, 1924^{i c g}
- Polycentropus sabulosus Leonard & Leonard, 1949^{i c g}
- Polycentropus sarandi Angrisano, 1994^{i c g}
- Polycentropus sardous Moretti, 1981^{i c g}
- Polycentropus schmidi Novak & Botosaneanu, 1965^{i c g}
- Polycentropus segregatus Mey & Joost, 1982^{i c g}
- Polycentropus similis Kimmins, 1962^{i c g}
- Polycentropus sinuosus Kimmins, 1962^{i c g}
- Polycentropus smithae Denning, 1949^{i c g}
- Polycentropus spicatus Yamamoto, 1967^{i c g}
- Polycentropus stephani Bowles, Mathis, & Hamilton, 1993^{i c g}
- Polycentropus surinamensis Flint, 1974^{i c g}
- Polycentropus telifer McLachlan, 1884^{i c g}
- Polycentropus tenerifensis Malicky, 1999^{i c g}
- Polycentropus terrai Malicky, 1980^{i c g}
- Polycentropus thaxtoni Hamilton & Holzenthal, 1986^{i c g}
- Polycentropus timesis (Denning, 1948)^{i c g}
- Polycentropus tuberculatus Flint, 1983^{i c g}
- Polycentropus turquino Botosaneanu, 1980^{i c g}
- Polycentropus unicus Hsu & Chen, 1996^{i c g}
- Polycentropus unispina Flint, 1991^{i c g}
- Polycentropus valdiviensis Flint, 1983^{i c g}
- Polycentropus vanachakuni Schmid & Denning, 1979^{i c g}
- Polycentropus vanderpooli Flint, 1976^{i c g}
- Polycentropus variatus Navas, 1917^{i c g}
- Polycentropus variegatus (Banks, 1900)^{b}
- Polycentropus veracruzensis Flint, 1981^{i c g}
- Polycentropus vernus Hamilton, Harris & Lago, 1990^{i c g}
- Polycentropus volcanus Holzenthal & Hamilton, 1988^{i c g}
- Polycentropus weedi Blickle & Morse, 1955^{i c g}
- Polycentropus yuecelcaglari Sipahiler, 1999^{i c g}
- Polycentropus zanclus Flint, 1981^{i c g}
- Polycentropus zaneta Denning, 1948^{i c g}
- Polycentropus zurqui Holzenthal & Hamilton, 1988^{i c g}

Data sources: i = ITIS, c = Catalogue of Life, g = GBIF, b = Bugguide.net
