= Plectrocnemia variegata =

Scientific classification
- Kingdom: Animalia
- Phylum: Arthropoda
- Clade: Pancrustacea
- Class: Insecta
- Order: Trichoptera
- Family: Polycentropodidae
- Genus: Plectrocnemia
- Species: P. variegata

Binomial name
- Plectrocnemia variegata (Banks, 1900)

Synonyms
- Polycentropus variegatus Banks, 1900

Species of caddisfly

Plectrocnemia variegata is a species of tube maker caddisfly in the family Polycentropodidae, first described by Nathan Banks in 1900. It is found in North America.
