= Plectrocnemia crassicornis =

Scientific classification
- Kingdom: Animalia
- Phylum: Arthropoda
- Clade: Pancrustacea
- Class: Insecta
- Order: Trichoptera
- Family: Polycentropodidae
- Genus: Plectrocnemia
- Species: P. crassicornis

Binomial name
- Plectrocnemia crassicornis (Walker, 1852)

Synonyms
- Polycentropus crassicornis Walker, 1852

Species of caddisfly

Plectrocnemia crassicornis is a species of tube maker caddisfly in the family Polycentropodidae. It is found in North America.
