= Plectrocnemia remota =

Scientific classification
- Kingdom: Animalia
- Phylum: Arthropoda
- Clade: Pancrustacea
- Class: Insecta
- Order: Trichoptera
- Family: Polycentropodidae
- Genus: Plectrocnemia
- Species: P. remota

Binomial name
- Plectrocnemia remota (Banks, 1911)

Synonyms
- Polycentropus remotus Banks, 1911

Species of caddisfly

Plectrocnemia remota is a species of tube maker caddisfly in the family Polycentropodidae. It is found in North America.
