= Parapsyche apicalis =

Scientific classification
- Kingdom: Animalia
- Phylum: Arthropoda
- Clade: Pancrustacea
- Class: Insecta
- Order: Trichoptera
- Family: Arctopsychidae
- Genus: Parapsyche
- Species: P. apicalis

Binomial name
- Parapsyche apicalis (Banks, 1908)

Synonyms
- Arctopsyche apicalis Banks, 1908

Species of caddisfly

Parapsyche apicalis is a species of netspinning caddisfly in the family Hydropsychidae. It is found in North America.
