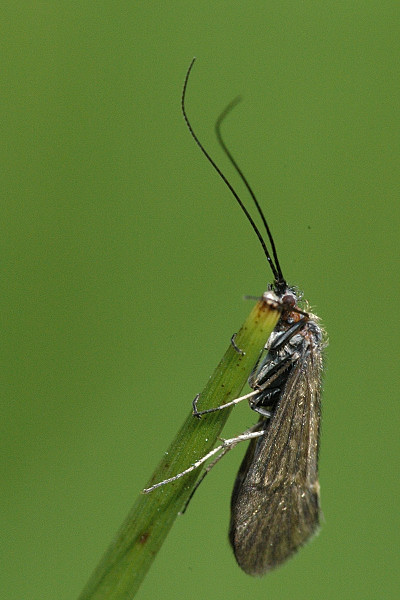
- Hydropsyche pellucidula

Scientific classification
- Kingdom: Animalia
- Phylum: Arthropoda
- Clade: Pancrustacea
- Class: Insecta
- Order: Trichoptera
- Suborder: Annulipalpia
- Superfamily: Hydropsychoidea

Families
- Arctopsychidae; Dipseudopsidae; Ecnomidae; Hydropsychidae; Polycentropodidae; Psychomyiidae; Xiphocentronidae

= Hydropsychoidea =

Superfamily of caddisflies

Hydropsychoidea is a superfamily of caddisflies.
