= Holocentropus interruptus =

Scientific classification
- Kingdom: Animalia
- Phylum: Arthropoda
- Clade: Pancrustacea
- Class: Insecta
- Order: Trichoptera
- Family: Polycentropodidae
- Genus: Holocentropus
- Species: H. interruptus

Binomial name
- Holocentropus interruptus Banks, 1914

Species of caddisfly

Holocentropus interruptus is a species of tube maker caddisfly in the family Polycentropodidae. It is found in North America. It was first described in 1914 by entomologist Nathan Banks.
