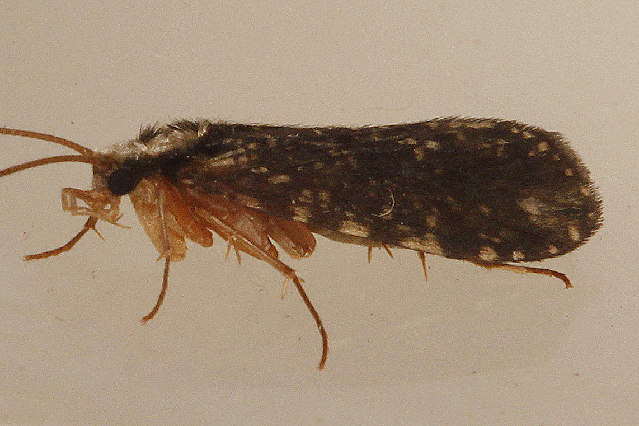

Scientific classification
- Kingdom: Animalia
- Phylum: Arthropoda
- Clade: Pancrustacea
- Class: Insecta
- Order: Trichoptera
- Family: Polycentropodidae
- Genus: Polycentropus
- Species: P. denningi

Binomial name
- Polycentropus denningi Smith, 1962

= Polycentropus denningi =

Species of caddisfly

Polycentropus denningi is a species of tube maker caddisfly in the family Polycentropodidae. It is found in North America.
