= Parapsyche elsis =

Scientific classification
- Kingdom: Animalia
- Phylum: Arthropoda
- Clade: Pancrustacea
- Class: Insecta
- Order: Trichoptera
- Family: Arctopsychidae
- Genus: Parapsyche
- Species: P. elsis

Binomial name
- Parapsyche elsis Milne, 1936

Synonyms
- Parapsyche brevipennis (Ling, 1938)

Species of caddisfly

Parapsyche elsis is a species of netspinning caddisfly in the family Hydropsychidae. It is found in North America.
