= Phylocentropus carolinus =

Scientific classification
- Kingdom: Animalia
- Phylum: Arthropoda
- Clade: Pancrustacea
- Class: Insecta
- Order: Trichoptera
- Family: Dipseudopsidae
- Genus: Phylocentropus
- Species: P. carolinus

Binomial name
- Phylocentropus carolinus Carpenter, 1933

Species of caddisfly

Phylocentropus carolinus is a species of caddisfly in the family Dipseudopsidae. It is found in North America.
