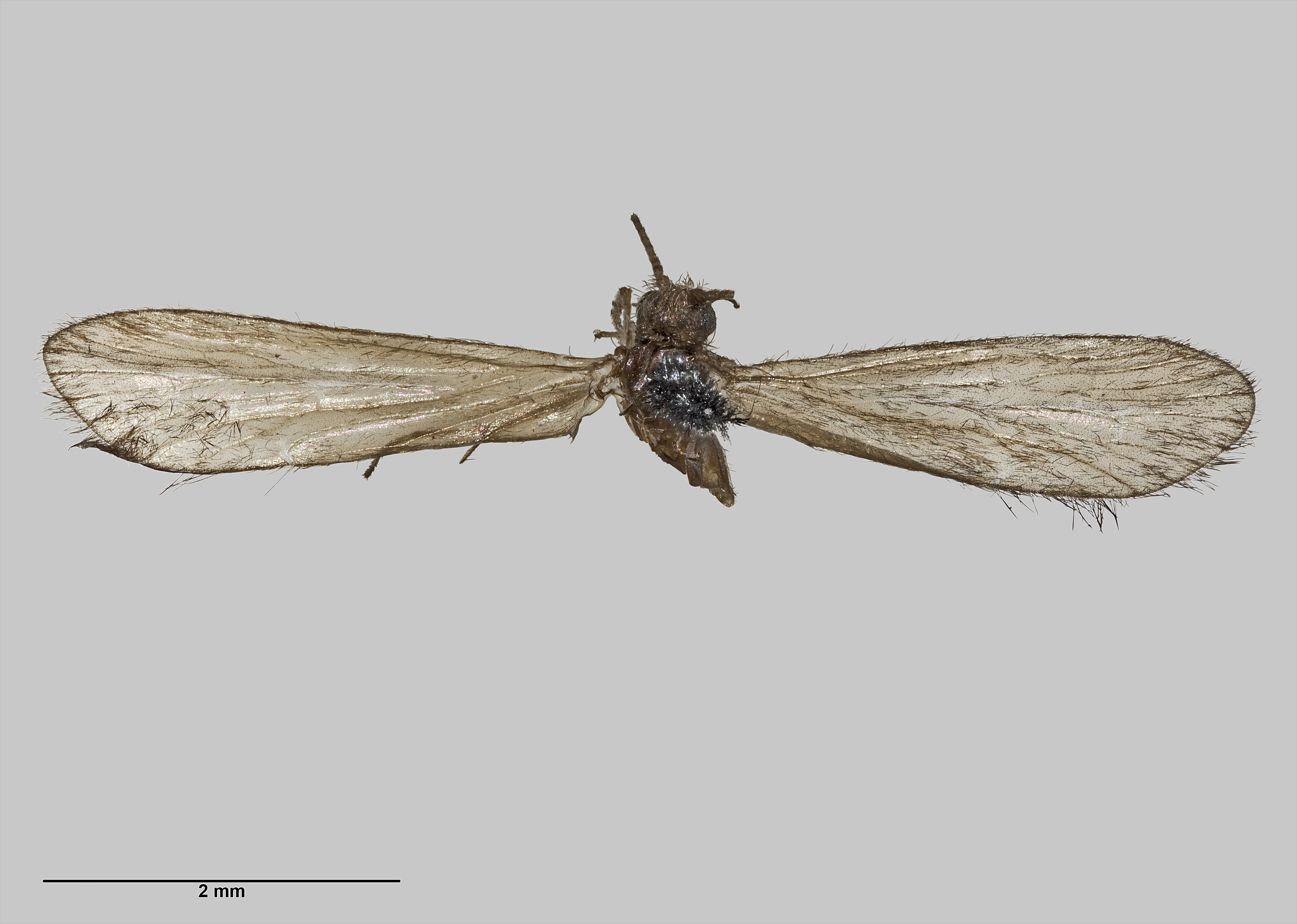
- Female holotype specimen held at the Auckland War Memorial Museum

Conservation status
- Naturally Uncommon (NZ TCS)

Scientific classification
- Kingdom: Animalia
- Phylum: Arthropoda
- Clade: Pancrustacea
- Class: Insecta
- Order: Trichoptera
- Family: Ecnomidae
- Genus: Ecnomina
- Species: E. zealandica

Binomial name
- Ecnomina zealandica Wise, 1958

= Ecnomina zealandica =

Species of caddisfly

Ecnomina zealandica is a species of caddisfly belonging to the family Ecnomidae. The species was first described by Keith Arthur John Wise in 1958, and is endemic to New Zealand.

== Taxonomy ==
The species was identified by Wise in 1958, and is the only known member of the genus Ecnomina in New Zealand. Because of this, observations of Ecnomina larvae in New Zealand are assumed to be Ecnomina zealandica.

== Description ==
Wise's original text (the type description) reads as follows:

HEAD fuscous; ANTENNAE ochraceous. THORAX fuscous, LEGS ochraceous. ANTERIOR WING light fuscous, fringe darker. VENATION. In anterior wing apical forks 3 and 4 sessile, the median cell extending between them. In posterior wing apical fork 3 about as long as its footstalk. Length of anterior wing, 3.5 mm (0.14 in).

Wise noted that the species could be distinguished from Australian Ecnomina species by the apical forks 3 and 4 of the anterior wing being sessile and not stalked. The larvae are 4.8 mm (0.19 in) in length.

== Distribution and habitat ==
The species is endemic to New Zealand. While specimens have primarily been collected from the Auckland Region and Waikato Region, the species' range is likely wider. It has been described as one of the rarest caddisflies in New Zealand, with no observations of the adults of the species between the 1940s and 2002, when specimens began to be identified in Malaise traps. Drinan et al. (2020) speculate that the species' rarity may point to a behavioural difference in the species, such as being diurnal, or not being attracted to ultraviolet light.

Larvae of E. zealandica have been collected from Fissidens moss from stream banks.
