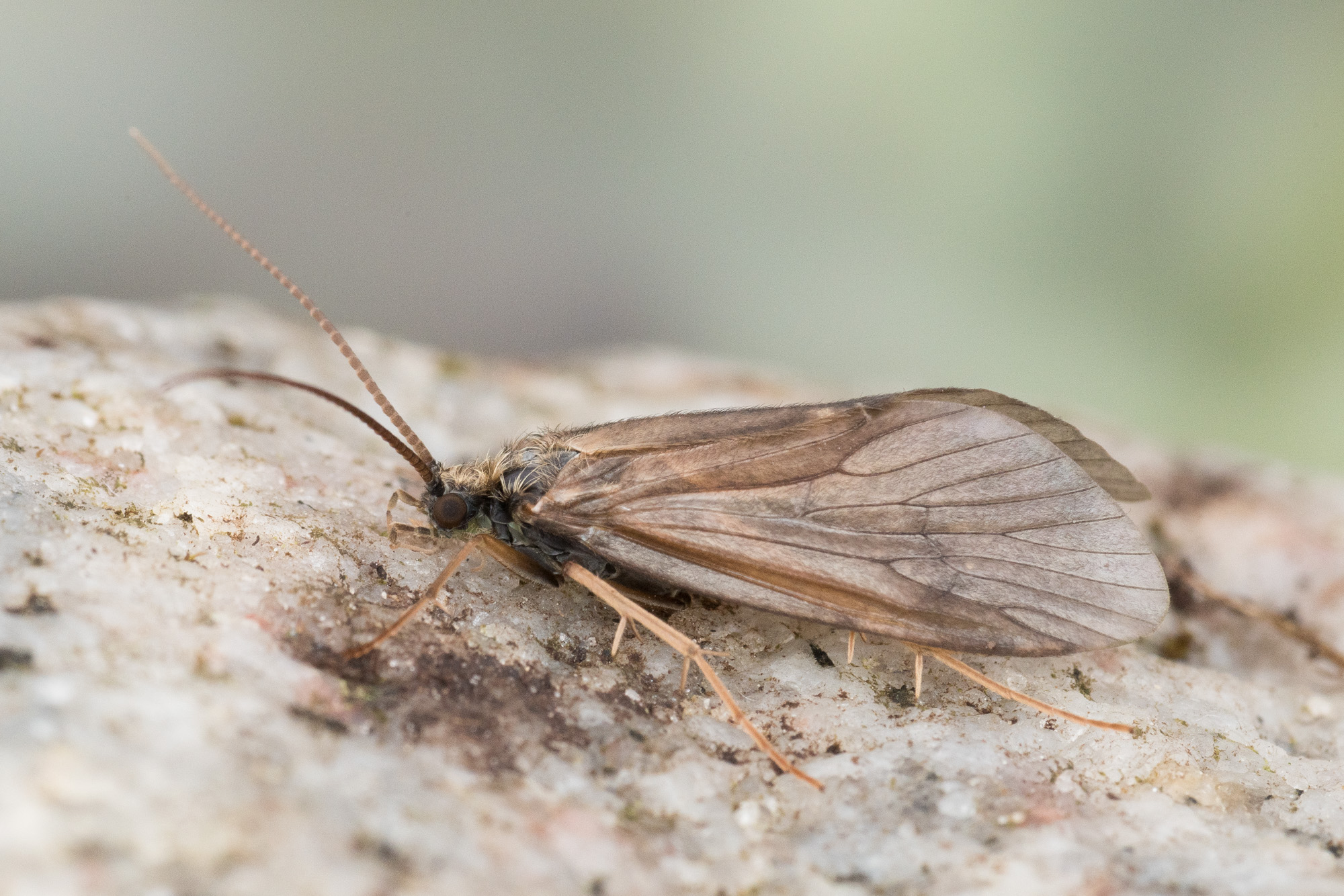

Conservation status
- Secure (NatureServe)

Scientific classification
- Kingdom: Animalia
- Phylum: Arthropoda
- Clade: Pancrustacea
- Class: Insecta
- Order: Trichoptera
- Family: Arctopsychidae
- Genus: Arctopsyche
- Species: A. ladogensis

Binomial name
- Arctopsyche ladogensis (Kolenati, 1859)

Synonyms
- Aphelocheira ladogensis Kolenati, 1859

= Arctopsyche ladogensis =

Species of caddisfly

Arctopsyche ladogensis, the Ladoga net-spinning caddisfly, is a species of caddisfly in the family Hydropsychidae. It is found in Europe, Northern Asia (excluding China), and northern North America.
