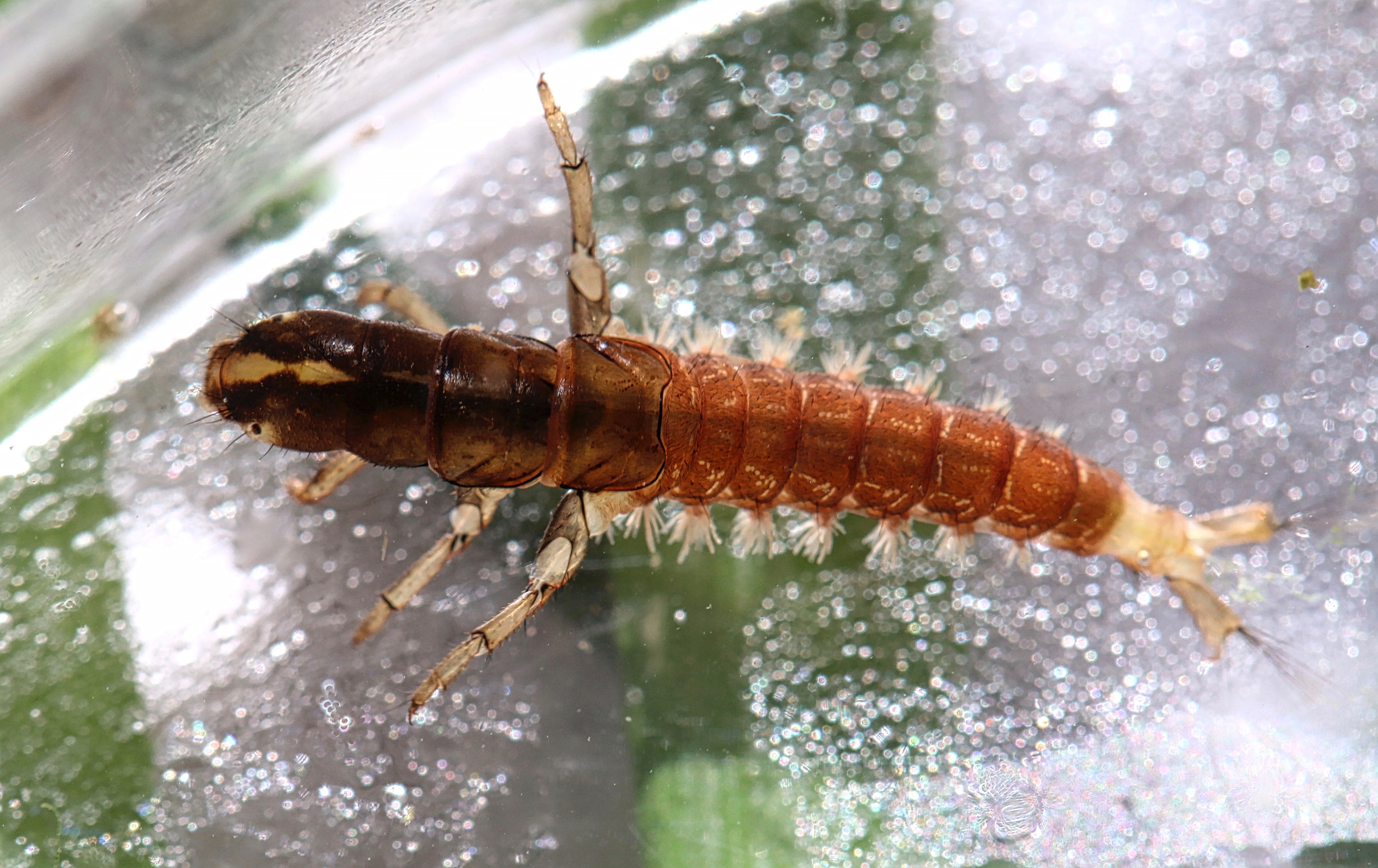

Scientific classification
- Kingdom: Animalia
- Phylum: Arthropoda
- Clade: Pancrustacea
- Class: Insecta
- Order: Trichoptera
- Family: Arctopsychidae
- Genus: Arctopsyche
- Species: A. grandis

Binomial name
- Arctopsyche grandis (Banks, 1900)

Synonyms
- Arctopsyche phryganoides Banks, 1918; Hydropsyche grandis Banks, 1900

= Arctopsyche grandis =

Species of caddisfly

Arctopsyche grandis is a species of netspinning caddisfly in the family Hydropsychidae. It is found in North America.
