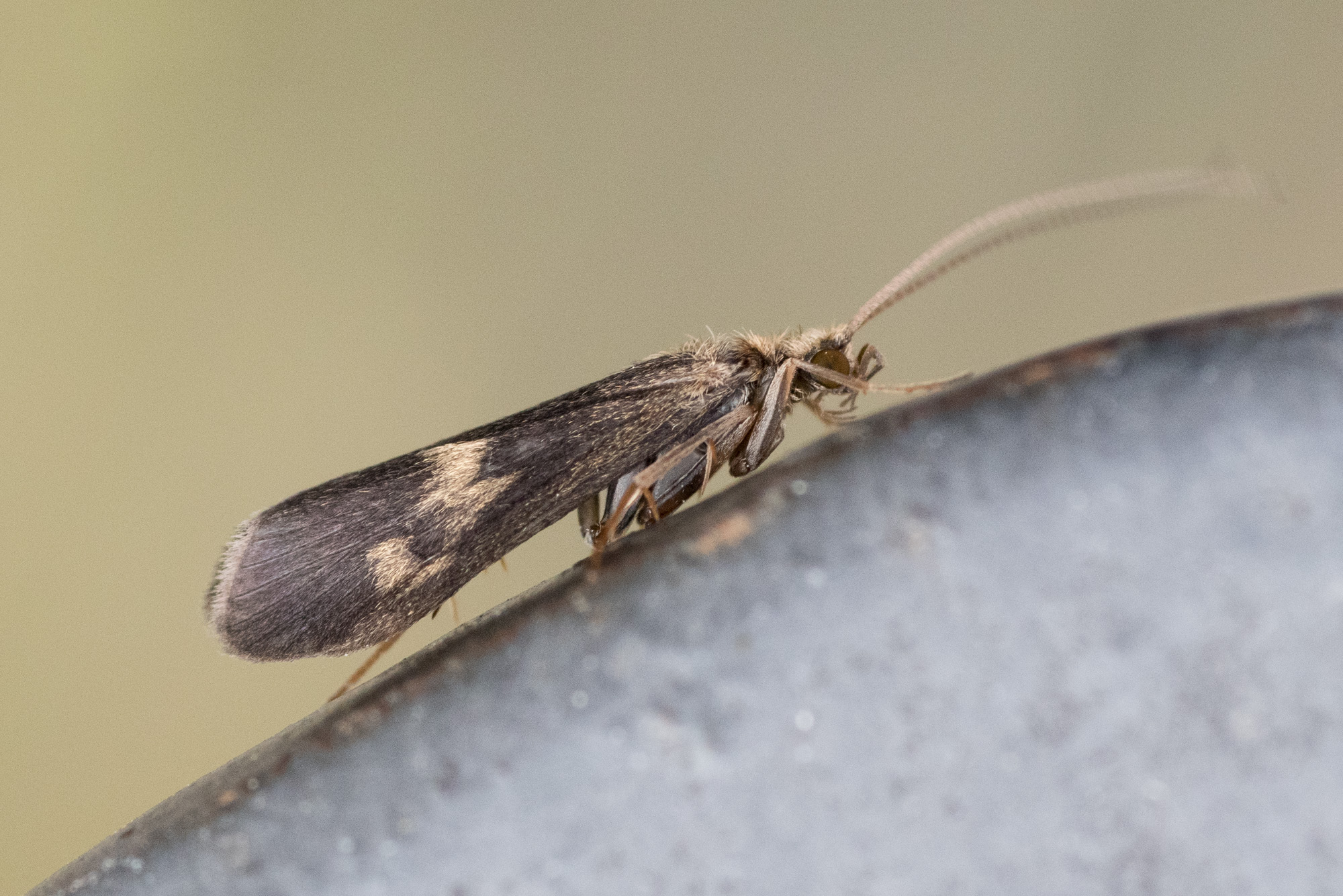
- Neureclipsis bimaculata male

Scientific classification
- Kingdom: Animalia
- Phylum: Arthropoda
- Clade: Pancrustacea
- Class: Insecta
- Order: Trichoptera
- Family: Polycentropodidae
- Genus: Neureclipsis
- Species: N. bimaculata

Binomial name
- Neureclipsis bimaculata (Linnaeus, 1758)

Synonyms
- Anticyra robusta Walker, 1852; Phryganea bimaculata Linnaeus, 1758; Phryganea noctuaeformis Schrank, 1802; Phryganea tigurinensis Fabricius, 1798; Polycentropus concolor Burmeister, 1839

= Neureclipsis bimaculata =

Species of caddisfly

Neureclipsis bimaculata, a species of caddisfly (Trichoptera), is a Holarctic species. Distributed from Alaska, across northern America and throughout Northern Europe.

Neureclipsis bimaculata has not been assessed by the IUCN for conservation concern, but is reported to be a common species.

== Description ==
Adults are a dull brownish grey. Male distal hindwing is tinted brownish grey. Female forewings are golden brown with the distal hindwing tinted golden brown.

== Life history ==
Adults are found from late May to late September. This species is found around waterways, ranging from small creeks to large rivers. The larvae are predacious filter feeders which restricts them to slower currents.
