= Phylocentropus placidus =

Scientific classification
- Kingdom: Animalia
- Phylum: Arthropoda
- Clade: Pancrustacea
- Class: Insecta
- Order: Trichoptera
- Family: Dipseudopsidae
- Genus: Phylocentropus
- Species: P. placidus

Binomial name
- Phylocentropus placidus (Banks, 1905)

Synonyms
- Holocentropus placidus Banks, 1905; Phylocentropus irroratus Navás, 1934; Polycentropus placidus (Banks, 1905); Polycentropus maximus (Vorhies, 1909)

Species of caddisfly

Phylocentropus placidus is a species of caddisfly in the family Dipseudopsidae. It is found in North America.
