= Phylocentropus lucidus =

Scientific classification
- Kingdom: Animalia
- Phylum: Arthropoda
- Clade: Pancrustacea
- Class: Insecta
- Order: Trichoptera
- Family: Dipseudopsidae
- Genus: Phylocentropus
- Species: P. lucidus

Binomial name
- Phylocentropus lucidus (Hagen, 1861)

Synonyms
- Polycentropus lucidus Hagen, 1861

Species of caddisfly

Phylocentropus lucidus is a species of caddisfly in the family Dipseudopsidae. It is found in North America.
