= Holocentropus flavus =

Scientific classification
- Kingdom: Animalia
- Phylum: Arthropoda
- Clade: Pancrustacea
- Class: Insecta
- Order: Trichoptera
- Family: Polycentropodidae
- Genus: Holocentropus
- Species: H. flavus

Binomial name
- Holocentropus flavus Banks, 1908

Species of caddisfly

Holocentropus flavus is a species of tube maker caddisfly in the family Polycentropodidae. It is found in North America.
