= Neureclipsis crepuscularis =

Scientific classification
- Kingdom: Animalia
- Phylum: Arthropoda
- Clade: Pancrustacea
- Class: Insecta
- Order: Trichoptera
- Family: Polycentropodidae
- Genus: Neureclipsis
- Species: N. crepuscularis

Binomial name
- Neureclipsis crepuscularis (Walker, 1852)

Species of caddisfly

Neureclipsis crepuscularis is a species of tube maker caddisflies in the family Polycentropodidae. It is found in North America.
