= Cernotina spicata =

Scientific classification
- Kingdom: Animalia
- Phylum: Arthropoda
- Clade: Pancrustacea
- Class: Insecta
- Order: Trichoptera
- Family: Polycentropodidae
- Genus: Cernotina
- Species: C. spicata

Binomial name
- Cernotina spicata Ross, 1938

Species of caddisfly

Cernotina spicata is a species of tube maker caddisfly in the family Polycentropodidae. It is found in North America.
