= Xiphocentronidae =

- Melanotrichia acclivopennis

Scientific classification
- Kingdom: Animalia
- Phylum: Arthropoda
- Clade: Pancrustacea
- Class: Insecta
- Order: Trichoptera
- Suborder: Annulipalpia
- Superfamily: Hydropsychoidea
- Family: Xiphocentronidae; Schmid, 1982

Subfamilies
- Proxiphocentroninae; Xiphocentroninae

Family of caddisflies

The Xiphocentronidae are a family of caddisflies. It has previously been treated as a subfamily of Psychomyiidae, and has a broad distribution, including parts of Asia, Central Africa and the Americas. It contains nine genera, in three subfamilies: Since the subgenus Cnodocentron (Caenocentron) was elevated to genus level; and the Cretaceous fossil genus Palerasnitsynus was moved from Psychomyiidae to a new subfamily within Xiphocentronidae.

† Palerasnitsyninae Wichard, 2023

- Palerasnitsynus Wichard, Ross & Ross, 2011

Proxiphocentroninae Schmid, 1982

- Proxiphocentron Schmid, 1982

Xiphocentroninae Ross, 1949

- Abaria Mosely, 1948
- Caenocentron Schmid, 1982
- Cnodocentron Schmid, 1982
- Drepanocentron Schmid, 1982
- Machairocentron Schmid, 1982
- Melanotrichia Ulmer, 1906
- Xiphocentron Brauer, 1870
