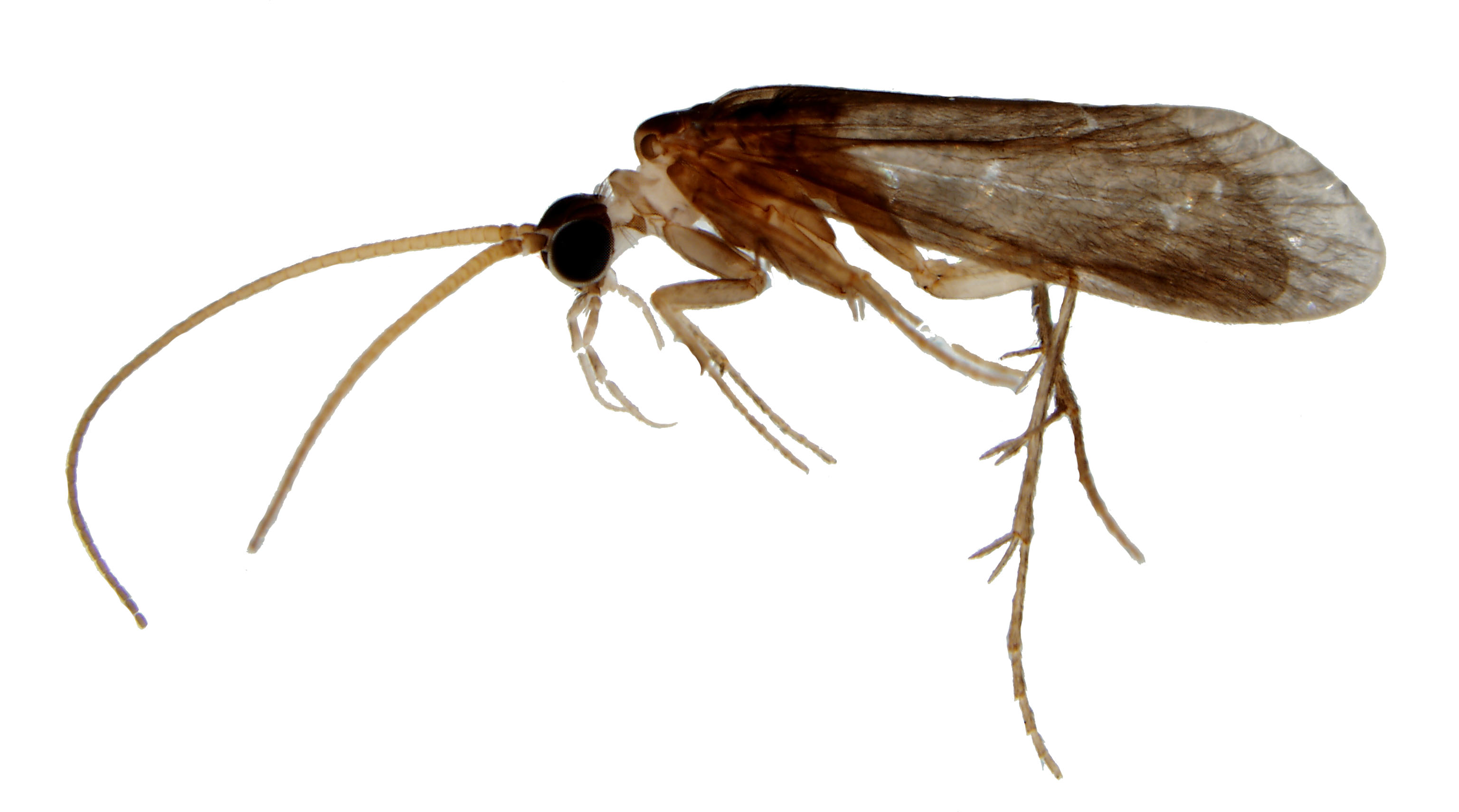
- Male Darternomina

Scientific classification
- Kingdom: Animalia
- Phylum: Arthropoda
- Clade: Pancrustacea
- Class: Insecta
- Order: Trichoptera
- Superfamily: Hydropsychoidea
- Family: Ecnomidae; Ulmer, 1903

Genera
- Austrotinodes; Agmina; Daternomina; Ecnomina; Ecnomus; Parecnomina; Zelandoptila

= Ecnomidae =

Ecnomidae Temporal range: Barremian–Present

Family of caddisflies

The Ecnomidae are a family of caddisflies comprising 9 genera with a total of 375 species.

== Distribution ==
The Ecnomidae have a Gondwanan distribution, except one genus, which also is present in Oriental and Palearctic regions.

== Morphology ==
The adult is a mostly small to medium-sized caddisfly with a wingspan of 6–18 mm (0.24–0.71 in), with dull grayish-brown mottled wings. Ocelli are absent. The maxillary palp is five-segmented. The apical segment is flexible. The antennae are, at most, as long as the forewing. Forewing R1 is usually forked at the apex; the discoidal and median cells present and closed. The female abdomen terminates either flat out or with an elongated ovipositor.

The larva is small to medium-sized 5–10 mm (0.20–0.39 in) long. The head and all thoracic nota are sclerotised. The prolegs on the abdomen are highly formed with large anal claws terminal.

== Behavior and ecology ==
The Ecnomidae larval stage, like most trichoptera larvae, is spent completely in fresh water. They are predatory, but some genera feed also on algae and detritus. They construct fixed tubes, retreats of silk, on logs or rocks. Permanent ponds and lakes or slower-flowing waters is suitable habitat for Ecnomidae larvae.

== Taxonomy and systematics ==
The Ecnomidae taxonomy has been problematic, Ecnomidae was first described (Ulmer 1903) as a subfamily of Hydropsychidae, and later as a subfamily within Psychomiidae. The family Ecnomidae is now accepted as monophyletic beside its sister-group Polycentropodidae. The Ecnomidae contain at least 9 genera with the most diversity found in the genus Ecnomus. Currently, a total of 375 species are described. In recent years, several new species has been discovered, mainly from the Oceania region. Other phylogenetically distinct genera exist which have not been scientifically described yet.

=== Genera ===
- †Archaeotinodes Baltic amber, Eocene
- Absensomina
- Agmina: 20 species endemic to New Caledonia
- Austrotinodes: 37 named species distributed in South and Central America, forms a sister group to 11 Austrotinodes species found in Australia
- Caledomina: 4 species from New Caledonia
- Daternomina: 10–20 species found in Australia, especially Tasmania, was formerly described as Ecnomina, but is now regarded as genus since they possess modified wing venation and female genitalia characters
- Ecnomus: more than 260 described species widespread in the Palearctic, Oriental and Afrotropical regions. Psychomyiellodes, is a monophyletic group within Ecnomus, with eight species endemic to the Afrotropical region.
- Ecnomina: 23 named species found primarily in Australia, with one in New Zealand
- Neboissomina: seven species described
- Parecnomina: seven described species endemic to the Afrotropical region, is easily distinguished from Ecnomus based on wing and genitalia characters, and is regarded as a sister group to Ecnomus.
- Wellsomina: Twelve species

All Ecnomidae genera are restricted to the Southern Hemisphere except the genus Ecnomus, which is widely distributed. This means the group may have had a Gondwanan origin. The genus Ecnomus is also known from the Barremian aged Lebanese amber.

Else see Subfamilia: Psychomyiinae:

- Zelandoptila: two species endemic to Australia and New Zealand
