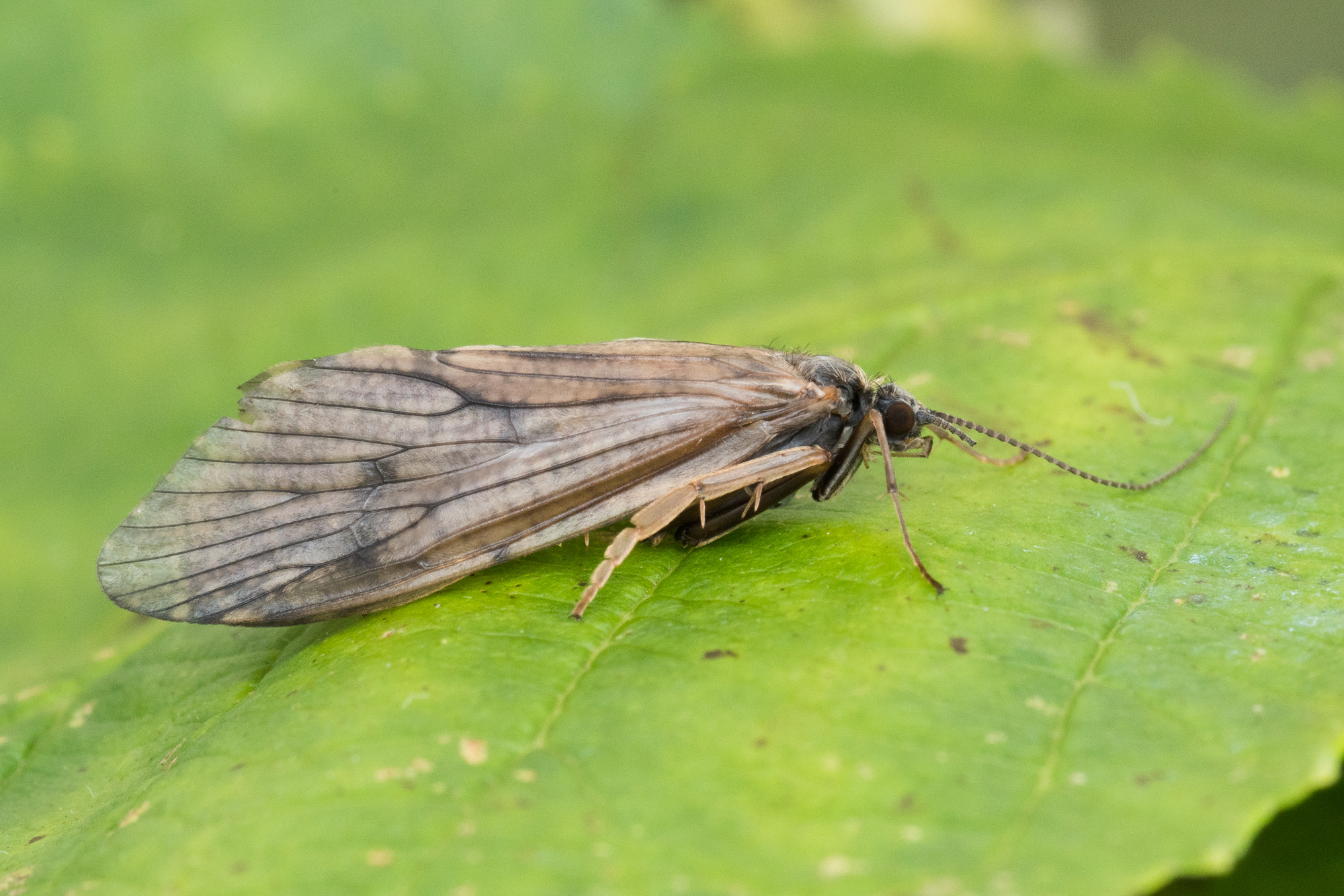
- Arctopsyche ladogensis (female)

Scientific classification
- Kingdom: Animalia
- Phylum: Arthropoda
- Clade: Pancrustacea
- Class: Insecta
- Order: Trichoptera
- Family: Arctopsychidae
- Genus: Arctopsyche; McLachlan, 1868

= Arctopsyche =

Genus of caddisflies

Arctopsyche is a genus of netspinning caddisflies in the family Hydropsychidae. There are more than 20 described species in Arctopsyche.

== Species ==
These 27 species belong to the genus Arctopsyche:

- Arctopsyche amurensis Martynov, 1934
- Arctopsyche arcuata Schmid, 1968
- Arctopsyche bicornis Schmid, 1968
- Arctopsyche californica Ling, 1938
- Arctopsyche cervinata Mey, 1997
- Arctopsyche composita Martynov, 1930
- Arctopsyche fissa Schmid, 1968
- Arctopsyche grandis (Banks, 1900)
- Arctopsyche hirayamai Matsumura, 1931
- Arctopsyche hynreck Malicky & Chantaramongkol, 1991
- Arctopsyche inaequispinosa Schmid, 1968
- Arctopsyche inermis Banks, 1943
- Arctopsyche integra Schmid, 1968
- Arctopsyche irrorata Banks, 1905
- Arctopsyche ladogensis (Kolenati, 1859)
- Arctopsyche lobata Martynov, 1930
- Arctopsyche mesogona Mey, 1997
- Arctopsyche palpata Martynov, 1934
- Arctopsyche pluviosa Navas, 1916
- Arctopsyche reticulata (Ulmer, 1915)
- Arctopsyche shimianensis Gui & Yang, 2000
- Arctopsyche spinifera Ulmer, 1907
- Arctopsyche taiwanensis
- Arctopsyche tricornis Schmid, 1968
- Arctopsyche trispinosa Schmid, 1968
- Arctopsyche variabilis Schmid, 1968
- Arctopsyche vietnamensis Mey, 1997
