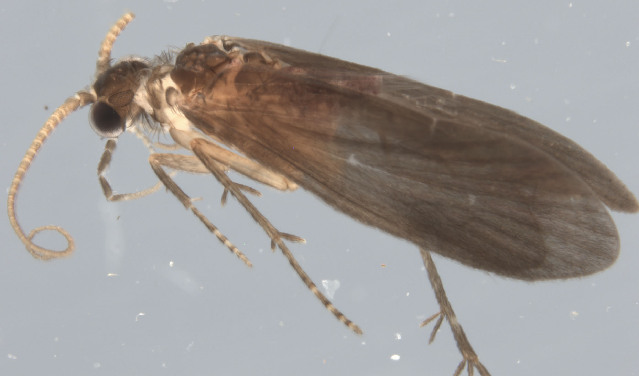
- Ecnomina alluna

Scientific classification
- Kingdom: Animalia
- Phylum: Arthropoda
- Clade: Pancrustacea
- Class: Insecta
- Order: Trichoptera
- Family: Ecnomidae
- Genus: Ecnomina

= Ecnomina =

Genus of insects

Ecnomina is a genus of caddisflies belonging to the family Ecnomidae. The genus was first recognised by Douglas Eric Kimmins in 1953.

== Taxonomy ==
Kimmins placed this genus in the family Ecnomidae due to the evidence of tibial spurs and the absence of fork number 1 in the anterior wing. He named Ecnomina spinosa as the type species.

== Distribution ==
Almost all species of Ecnomina are endemic to Australia, except for Ecnomina zealandica from New Zealand. One species from New Caledonia was previously identified as Ecnomina kavinia, but has since been identified as a species of Agmina.

== Genera ==
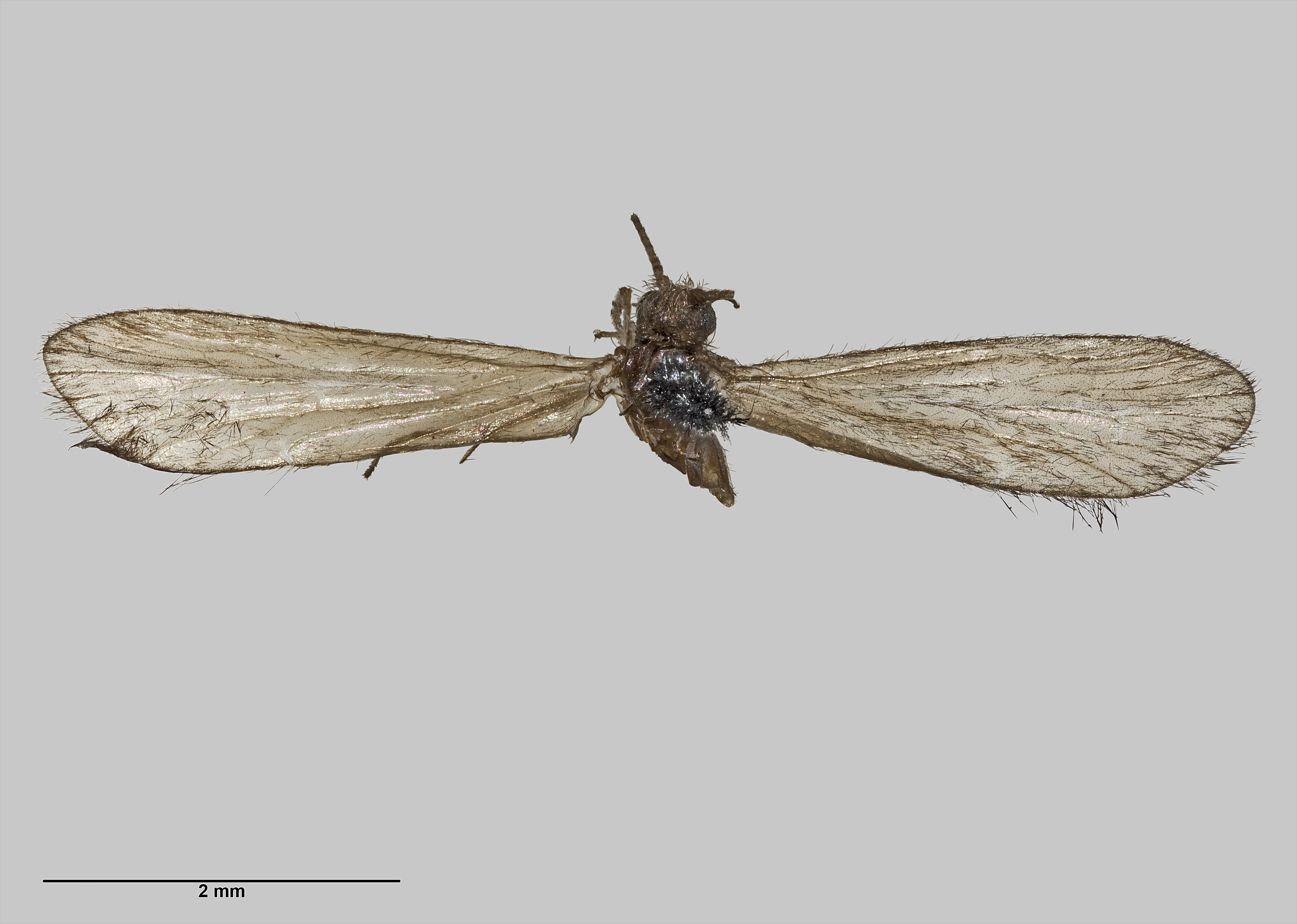
Female holotype specimen held at the Auckland War Memorial Museum

- Ecnomina alluna Cartwright, 2008
- Ecnomina batyle Neboiss, 1977
- Ecnomina chorisis Neboiss, 1978
- Ecnomina cohibilis Neboiss, 1982
- Ecnomina concava Cartwright, 2008
- Ecnomina irrorata Kimmins, 1953
- Ecnomina krokale Neboiss, 1978
- Ecnomina legula Neboiss, 1977
- Ecnomina merga Neboiss, 1982
- Ecnomina mesembria Neboiss, 1982
- Ecnomina radonica Cartwright & Dostine, 2022
- Ecnomina scindens Neboiss, 1982
- Ecnomina sentosa Neboiss, 1982
- Ecnomina serrata Cartwright, 2008
- Ecnomina sheldoni Cartwright, 2008
- Ecnomina spinosa Kimmins, 1953
- Ecnomina thinotes Neboiss, 1978
- Ecnomina trifurcata Kimmins, 1953
- Ecnomina trulla Neboiss, 1982
- Ecnomina vega Neboiss, 1977
- Ecnomina viatica Neboiss, 1982
- Ecnomina volcella Cartwright, 2008
- Ecnomina zealandica Wise, 1958
