= Proxiphocentron =

Scientific classification
- Kingdom: Animalia
- Phylum: Arthropoda
- Clade: Pancrustacea
- Class: Insecta
- Order: Trichoptera
- Family: Xiphocentronidae
- Subfamily: Proxiphocentroninae; Schmid, 1982
- Genus: Proxiphocentron; Schmid, 1982

Species
- Proxiphocentron anakmata Proxiphocentron arjinae Proxiphocentron prathamajam

Genus of caddisflies

Proxiphocentron is a genus of caddisflies from South-east Asia.
