= Cernotina =

Scientific classification
- Kingdom: Animalia
- Phylum: Arthropoda
- Clade: Pancrustacea
- Class: Insecta
- Order: Trichoptera
- Family: Polycentropodidae
- Genus: Cernotina; Ross, 1938

Genus of caddisflies

Cernotina is a genus of tube maker caddisflies in the family Polycentropodidae. There are more than 70 described species in Cernotina.

== Species ==
These 71 species belong to the genus Cernotina:

- Cernotina abbreviata Flint, 1971
- Cernotina acalyptra Flint, 1971
- Cernotina aestheticella Sykora, 1998
- Cernotina anhanguera
- Cernotina artiguensis Angrisano, 1994
- Cernotina aruma
- Cernotina astera Ross, 1941
- Cernotina attenuata Flint, 1971
- Cernotina bibrachiata Flint, 1971
- Cernotina bispicata
- Cernotina cacha Flint, 1971
- Cernotina cadeti Flint, 1968
- Cernotina calcea Ross, 1938
- Cernotina caliginosa Flint, 1968
- Cernotina carbonelli Flint, 1983
- Cernotina chelifera Flint, 1972
- Cernotina cingulata Flint, 1971
- Cernotina compressa Flint, 1971
- Cernotina cygnaea Flint, 1971
- Cernotina cygnea Flint
- Cernotina cystophora Flint, 1971
- Cernotina declinata Flint, 1971
- Cernotina decumbens Flint, 1971
- Cernotina depressa Flint, 1974
- Cernotina ecotura Sykora, 1998
- Cernotina encrypta Flint, 1971
- Cernotina falcata
- Cernotina fallaciosa Flint, 1983
- Cernotina filiformis Flint, 1971
- Cernotina flexuosa
- Cernotina harrisi Sykora, 1998
- Cernotina hastilis Flint, 1996
- Cernotina intersecta Flint, 1974
- Cernotina lanceolata
- Cernotina laticula Ross, 1952
- Cernotina lobisomem
- Cernotina longispina
- Cernotina longissima Flint, 1974
- Cernotina lutea Flint, 1968
- Cernotina mandeba Flint, 1974
- Cernotina mastelleri Flint, 1992
- Cernotina mediolaba Flint, 1972
- Cernotina medioloba Flint
- Cernotina nigridentata Sykora, 1998
- Cernotina obliqua Flint, 1971
- Cernotina odonta
- Cernotina ohio Ross, 1939
- Cernotina oklahoma Ross, 1938
- Cernotina pallida (Banks, 1904)
- Cernotina perpendicularis Flint, 1971
- Cernotina pesae
- Cernotina sexspinosa Flint, 1983
- Cernotina sinosa Ross, 1952
- Cernotina sinuosa
- Cernotina spicata Ross, 1938
- Cernotina spinigera Flint, 1971
- Cernotina spinosior Flint, 1991
- Cernotina stannardi Ross, 1952
- Cernotina subapicalis Flint, 1971
- Cernotina taeniata Ross, 1952
- Cernotina tiputini Camargos, Ríos-Touma & Holzenthal, 2017
- Cernotina trispina Flint, 1971
- Cernotina truncona Ross, 1947
- Cernotina uara Flint, 1971
- Cernotina uncifera Ross, 1952
- Cernotina unguiculata Flint, 1971
- Cernotina verna Flint, 1983
- Cernotina verticalis Flint, 1971
- Cernotina waorani Camargos, Ríos-Touma & Holzenthal, 2017
- Cernotina zanclana Ross, 1952
- † Cernotina pulchra Wichard, 2007
