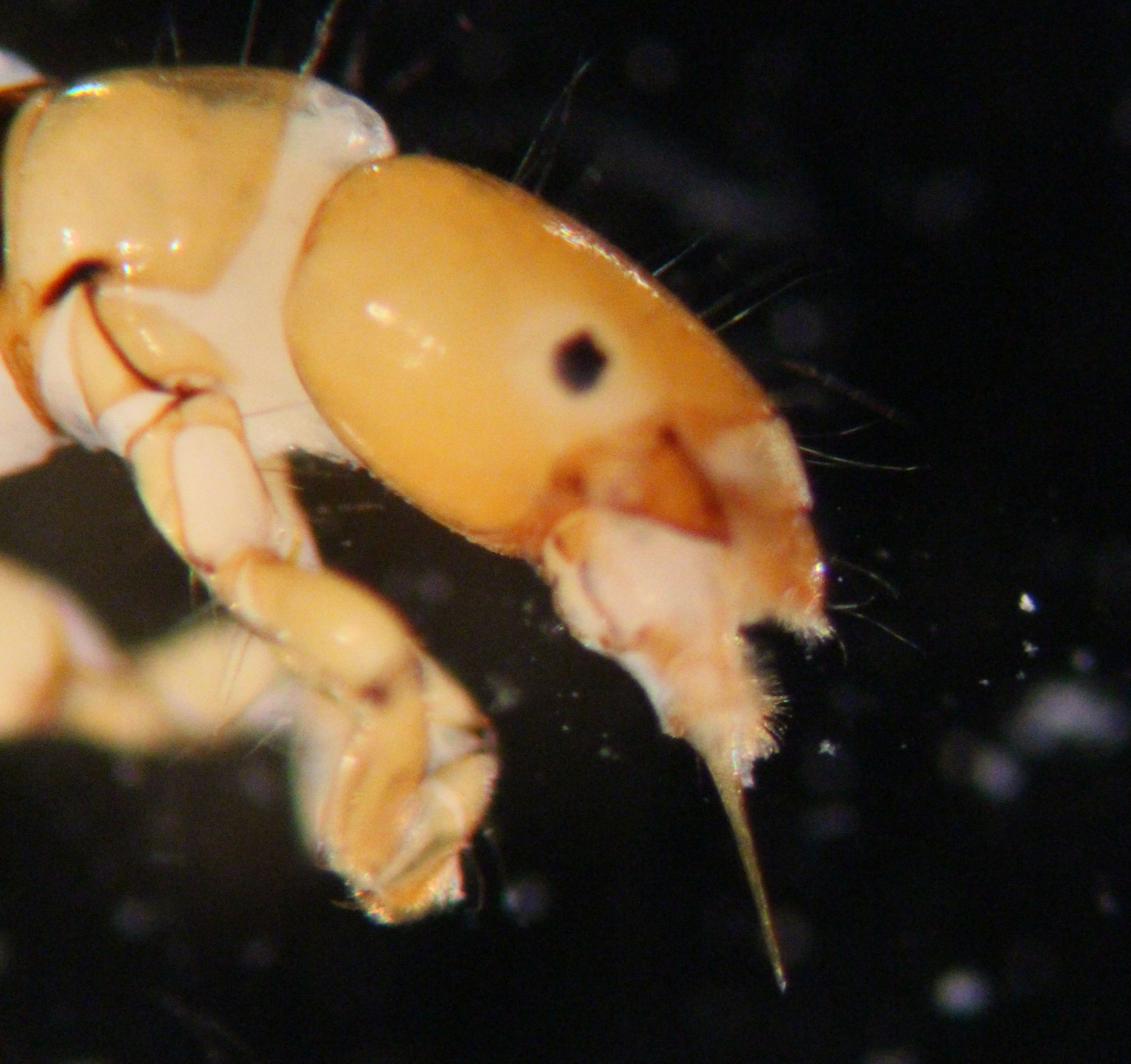

Scientific classification
- Kingdom: Animalia
- Phylum: Arthropoda
- Clade: Pancrustacea
- Class: Insecta
- Order: Trichoptera
- Family: Dipseudopsidae
- Genus: Phylocentropus; Banks, 1907

Synonyms
- Acrocentropus Betten, 1934

= Phylocentropus =

Phylocentropus Temporal range: Barremian–Recent

Genus of caddisflies

Phylocentropus is a genus of caddisflies in the family Dipseudopsidae. There are about 17 described species in Phylocentropus.

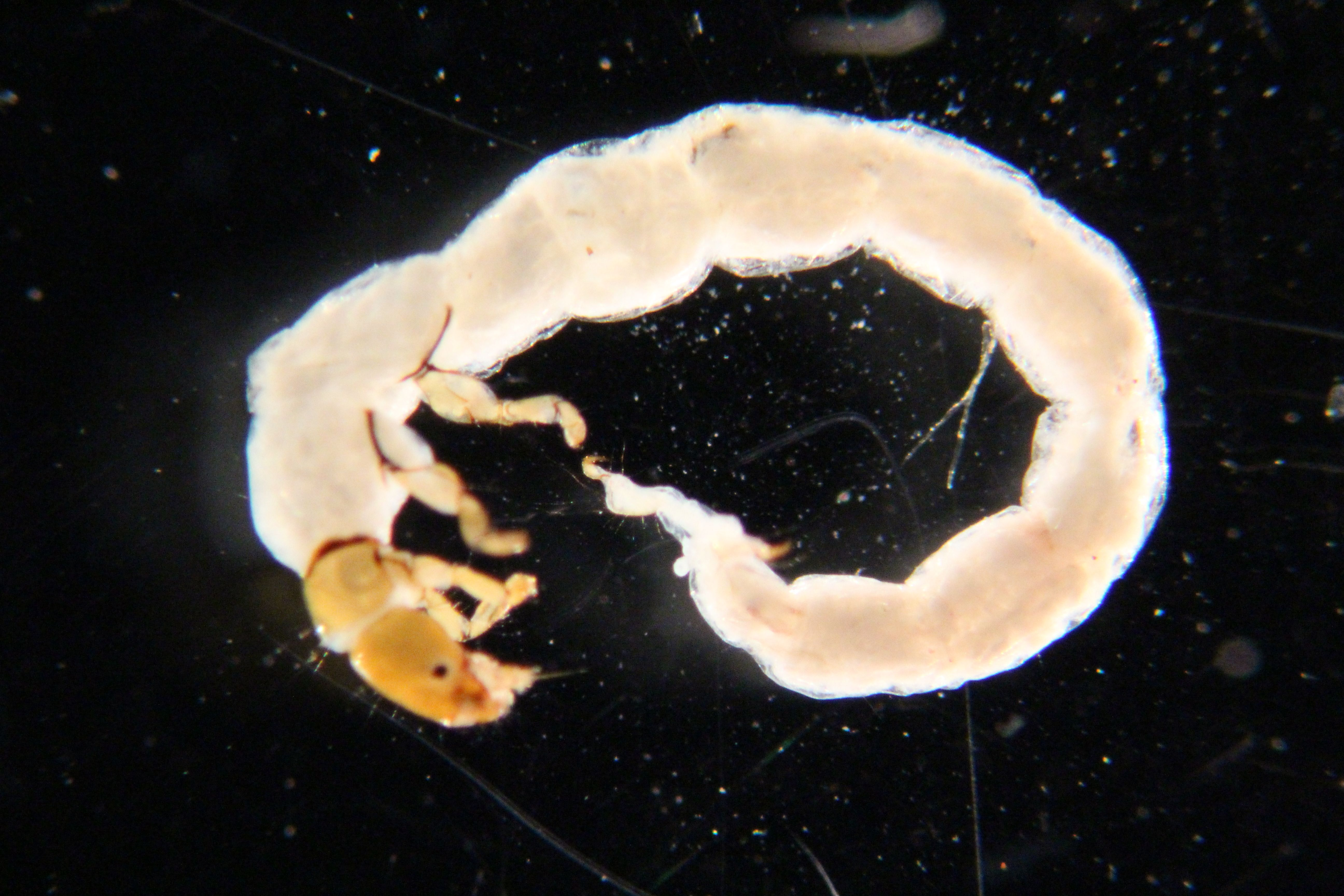

== Species ==
These 17 species belong to the genus Phylocentropus:

- Phylocentropus auriceps (Banks, 1905)
- Phylocentropus carolinus Carpenter, 1933
- Phylocentropus hansoni Root
- Phylocentropus harrisi Schuster & Hamilton, 1984
- Phylocentropus lucidus (Hagen, 1861)
- Phylocentropus narumonae Malicky & Chantaramongkol, 1997
- Phylocentropus orientalis Banks, 1931
- Phylocentropus placidus (Banks, 1905)
- Phylocentropus shigae Tsuda, 1942
- Phylocentropus simplex Ulmer, 1912
- Phylocentropus vietnamellus Mey, 1995
- † Phylocentropus antiquus Ulmer, 1912
- † Phylocentropus cretaceous Wichard & Bölling, 2000
- † Phylocentropus ligulatus Ulmer, 1912
- † Phylocentropus spiniger Ulmer, 1912
- † Phylocentropus succinolebanensis Wichard & Azar, 2018
- † Phylocentropus swolenskyi Wichard & Lüer, 2003

Fossil species are also known from the Barremian aged Lebanese amber and the Turonian aged New Jersey amber.
