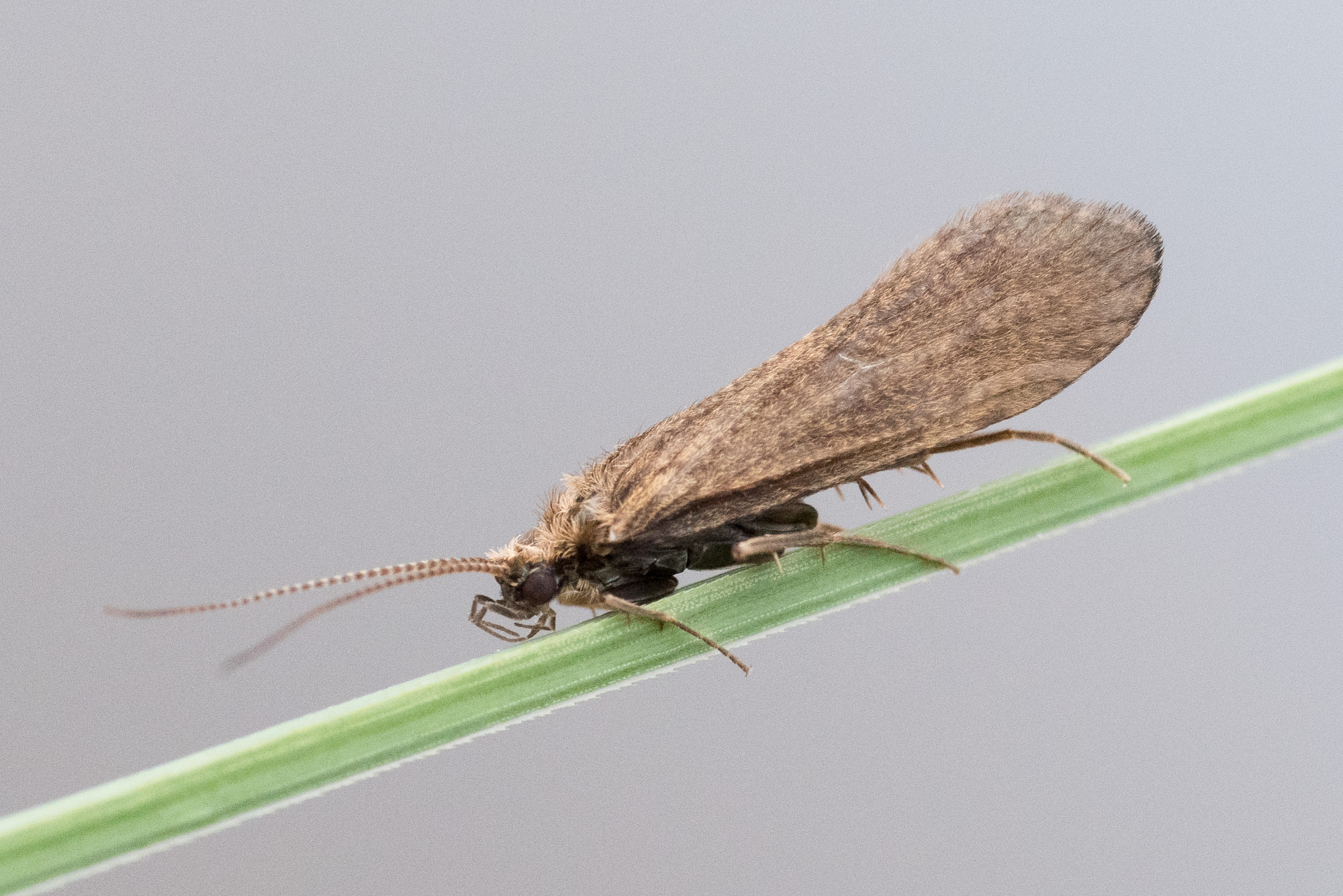
- Holocentropus dubius female

Scientific classification
- Kingdom: Animalia
- Phylum: Arthropoda
- Clade: Pancrustacea
- Class: Insecta
- Order: Trichoptera
- Family: Polycentropodidae
- Genus: Holocentropus; McLachlan, 1878

= Holocentropus =

Genus of caddisflies

Holocentropus is a genus of tube maker caddisflies in the family Polycentropodidae. There are more than 40 described species in Holocentropus.

== Species ==
These 42 species belong to the genus Holocentropus:

- Holocentropus cavus Mey, 1985
- Holocentropus dubius (Rambur, 1842)
- Holocentropus flavus Banks, 1908
- Holocentropus glacialis Ross, 1938
- Holocentropus grellus Milne, 1936
- Holocentropus insignis Martynov, 1924
- Holocentropus interruptus Banks, 1914
- Holocentropus longus Banks, 1914
- Holocentropus melanae Ross, 1938
- Holocentropus omiensis Iwata, 1927
- Holocentropus picicornis (Stephens, 1836)
- Holocentropus stagnalis (Albarda, 1874)
- Holocentropus varangensis Mey, 1987
- Holocentropus vietnamellus Malicky, 1995
- † Holocentropus calcaratus Ulmer, 1912
- † Holocentropus castus Mey, 1986
- † Holocentropus consanguineus Ulmer, 1912
- † Holocentropus consobrinus Ulmer, 1912
- † Holocentropus cornutus Ulmer, 1912
- † Holocentropus curvatus Ulmer, 1912
- † Holocentropus discedens Ulmer, 1912
- † Holocentropus dugoi Ivanov & Melnitsky, 2013
- † Holocentropus echinatus Ulmer, 1912
- † Holocentropus flexiflagrum Melnitsky & Ivanov, 2010
- † Holocentropus fundamentalis Ivanov & Melnitsky, 2013
- † Holocentropus horribilis Mey, 1986
- † Holocentropus incurvatus Mey, 1986
- † Holocentropus kobodok Melnitsky & Ivanov, 2013
- † Holocentropus lanciger Ulmer, 1912
- † Holocentropus omega Ulmer, 1912
- † Holocentropus operarius Mey, 1986
- † Holocentropus peregrinator Ivanov & Melnitsky, 2013
- † Holocentropus perlatus Ulmer, 1912
- † Holocentropus proximorepertus Ivanov & Melnitsky, 2013
- † Holocentropus scissus Ulmer, 1912
- † Holocentropus spurius Botosaneanu & Wichard, 1983
- † Holocentropus telergon Ivanov & Melnitsky, 2013
- † Holocentropus uncatus Ulmer, 1912
- † Holocentropus zhiltsovae Melnitsky & Ivanov, 2013
- † Polycentropus affinis (Pictet & Hagen, 1856)
- † Polycentropus atratus (Pictet & Hagen, 1856)
- † Polycentropus incertus (Pictet & Hagen, 1856)
