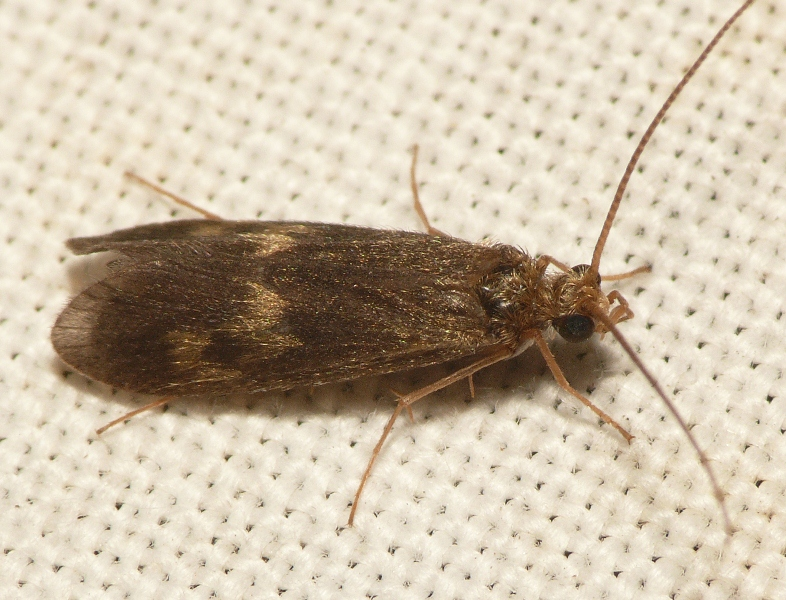
- Neureclipsis bimaculata. Location: The Netherlands - Rhenen - Blauwe Kamer

Scientific classification
- Kingdom: Animalia
- Phylum: Arthropoda
- Clade: Pancrustacea
- Class: Insecta
- Order: Trichoptera
- Family: Polycentropodidae
- Subfamily: Polycentropodinae
- Genus: Neureclipsis; McLachlan, 1864

= Neureclipsis =

Genus of caddisflies

Neureclipsis is a genus of tube maker caddisflies in the family Polycentropodidae. There are at least 8 described species in Neureclipsis.

Taxonomic note:

- Type species: Phryganea bimaculata C Linnaeus (monobasic).

== Species ==
- Neureclipsis bimaculata (Linnaeus, 1758)
- Neureclipsis crepuscularis (Walker, 1852)
- Neureclipsis kyotoensis Iwata, 1927
- Neureclipsis melco Ross, 1947
- Neureclipsis napaea Neboiss, 1986
- Neureclipsis parvula Banks, 1907
- Neureclipsis piersoni Frazer & Harris, 1991
- Neureclipsis valida (Walker, 1852)
