= Parapsyche =

Scientific classification
- Kingdom: Animalia
- Phylum: Arthropoda
- Clade: Pancrustacea
- Class: Insecta
- Order: Trichoptera
- Family: Arctopsychidae
- Genus: Parapsyche; Betten, 1934

Genus of caddisflies

Parapsyche is a genus of netspinning caddisflies in the family Hydropsychidae. There are more than 20 described species in Parapsyche.

== Species ==
These 25 species belong to the genus Parapsyche:

- Parapsyche acuta Schmid, 1964
- Parapsyche aias Malicky, 1997
- Parapsyche almota Ross, 1938
- Parapsyche angularia Mey, 1996
- Parapsyche apicalis (Banks, 1908)
- Parapsyche asiatica Schmid, 1959
- Parapsyche aureocephala Schmid, 1964
- Parapsyche bifida Schmid, 1959
- Parapsyche birmanica Schmid, 1968
- Parapsyche cardis Ross, 1938
- Parapsyche denticulata Schmid, 1964
- Parapsyche difformis (Banks, 1947)
- Parapsyche elsis Milne, 1936
- Parapsyche extensa Denning, 1949
- Parapsyche intawitschajanon Malicky & Chantaramongkol, 1992
- Parapsyche kchina Schmid, 1968
- Parapsyche kurosawai (Kobayashi, 1956)
- Parapsyche maculata (Ulmer, 1907)
- Parapsyche mahati Schmid, 1968
- Parapsyche shikotsuensis (Iwata, 1927)
- Parapsyche sinensis (Martynov, 1909)
- Parapsyche spinata Denning, 1949
- Parapsyche tchandratchuda Schmid, 1968
- Parapsyche turbinata Schmid, 1968
- Parapsyche variyasi Schmid, 1968
