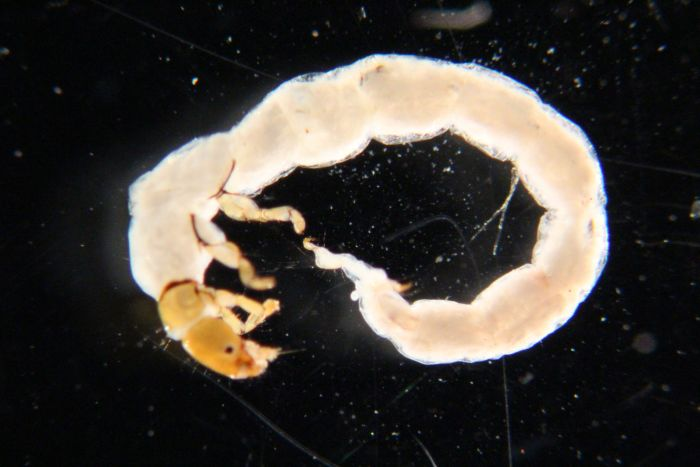

Scientific classification
- Kingdom: Animalia
- Phylum: Arthropoda
- Clade: Pancrustacea
- Class: Insecta
- Order: Trichoptera
- Family: Polycentropodidae
- Genus: Polycentropus; Curtis, 1835

Diversity
- at least 190 species

= Polycentropus =

Genus of caddisflies

Polycentropus is a genus of tube maker caddisflies in the family Polycentropodidae. There are more than 190 described species in Polycentropus.

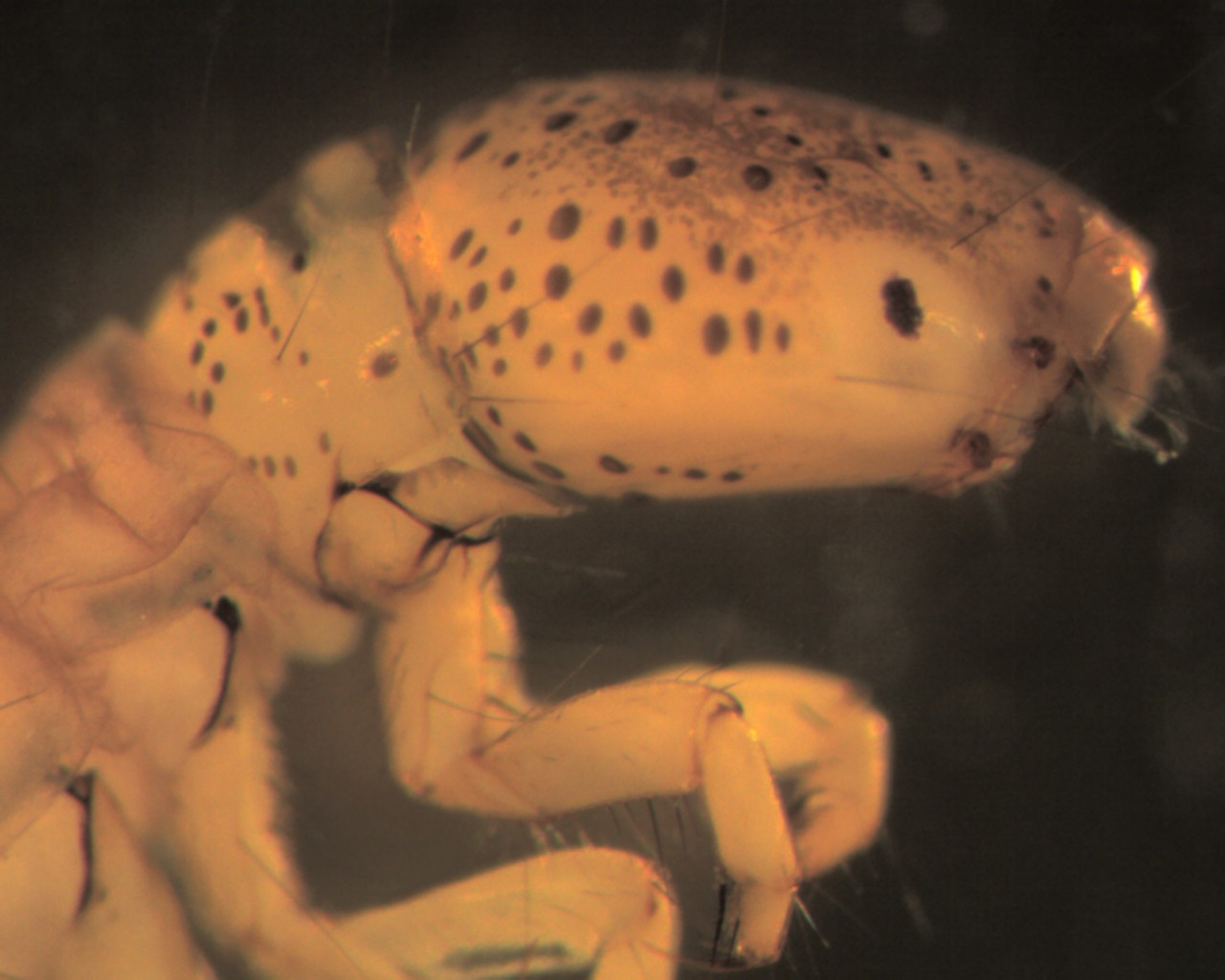

== See also ==
- List of Polycentropus species
