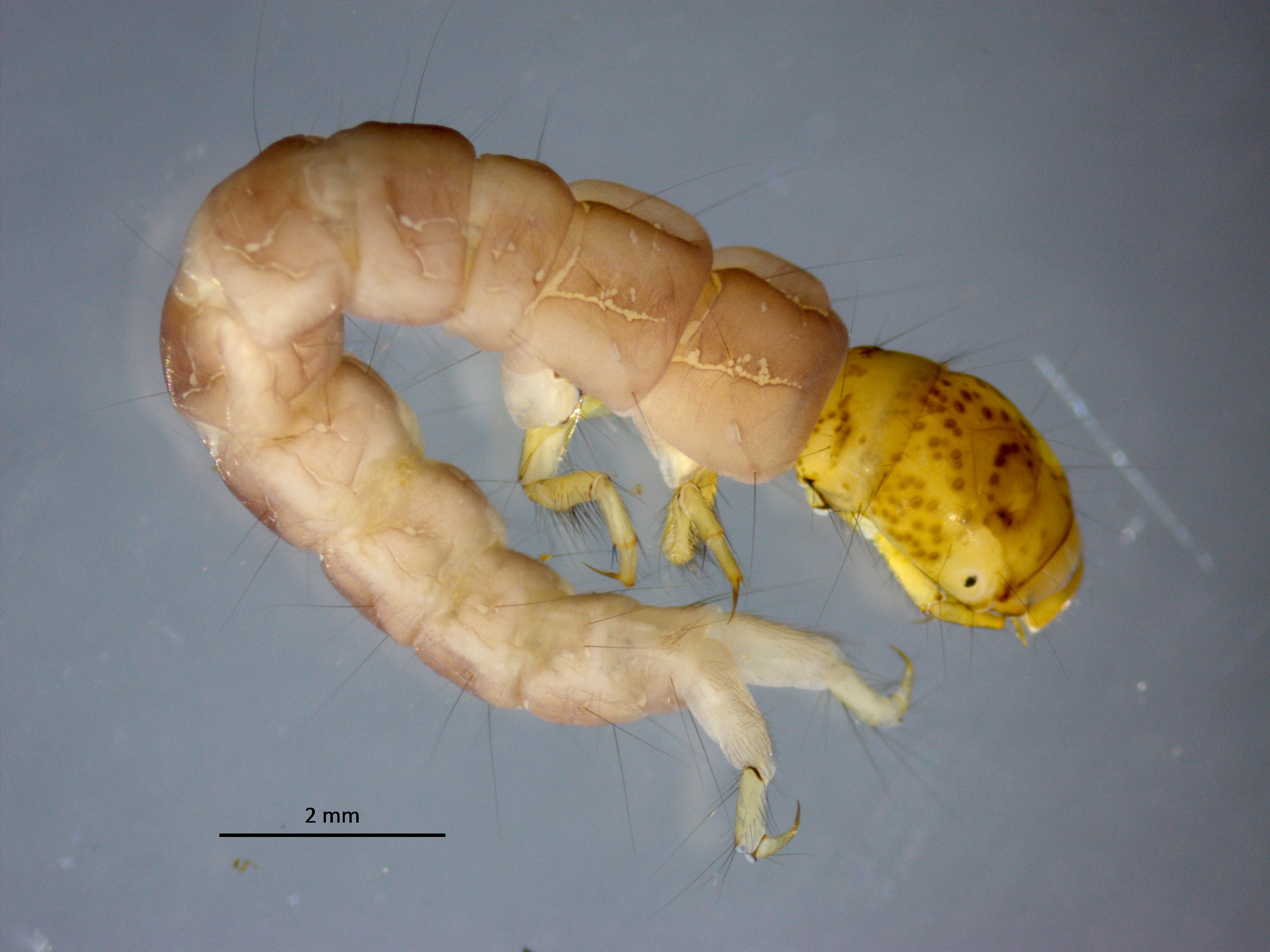
- Plectrocnemia conspersa

Scientific classification
- Kingdom: Animalia
- Phylum: Arthropoda
- Clade: Pancrustacea
- Class: Insecta
- Order: Trichoptera
- Family: Polycentropodidae
- Genus: Plectrocnemia; Stephens, 1836

Diversity
- at least 120 species

= Plectrocnemia =

Genus of caddisflies

Plectrocnemia is a genus of tube maker caddisflies in the family Polycentropodidae. There are more than 120 described species in Plectrocnemia.

== See also ==
- List of Plectrocnemia species
