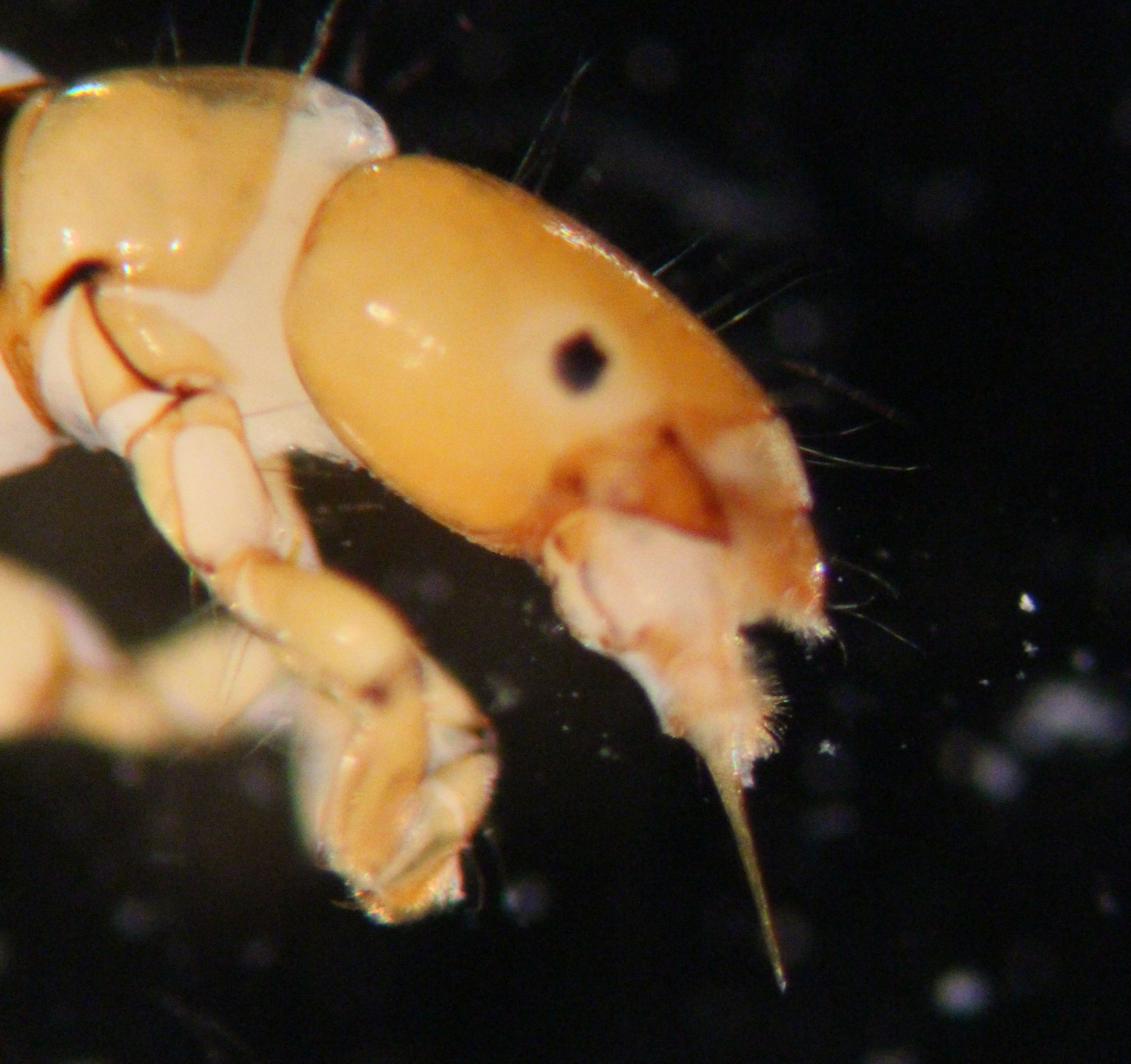
- Phylocentropus

Scientific classification
- Kingdom: Animalia
- Phylum: Arthropoda
- Clade: Pancrustacea
- Class: Insecta
- Order: Trichoptera
- Suborder: Annulipalpia
- Family: Dipseudopsidae; Ulmer, 1904

= Dipseudopsidae =

Dipseudopsidae Temporal range: Barremian–Recent

Family of caddisflies

Dipseudopsidae is a family of caddisflies in the order Trichoptera. There are about 6 genera and at least 110 described species in Dipseudopsidae.

The type genus for Dipseudopsidae is Dipseudopsis F. Walker, 1852. The oldest fossils are of the extant genus Phylocentropus, from the Barremian aged Lebanese amber.

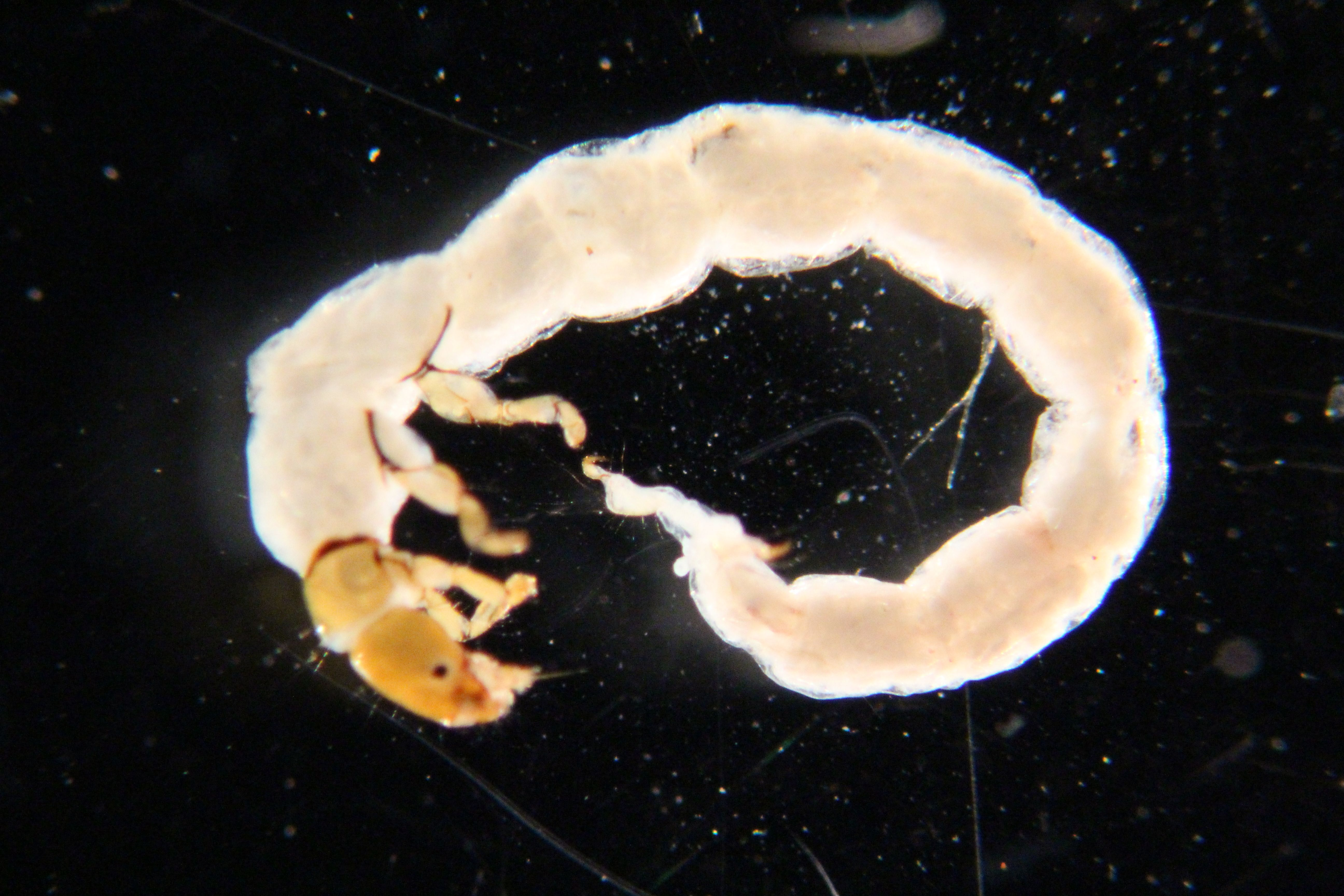
Phylocentropus

== Genera ==
These six genera belong to the family Dipseudopsidae:

- Dipseudopsis Walker, 1852^{i c g}
- Hyalopsyche Ulmer, 1904^{i c g}
- Hyalopsychella Ulmer, 1930^{i c g}
- Limnoecetis Marlier, 1955^{i c g}
- Phylocentropus Banks, 1907^{i c g b}
- Protodipseudopsis Ulmer, 1909^{i c g}
- †Taymyrodipseudon Ivanov and Melnitsky 2017 Taimyr amber, Russia, Santonian

Data sources: i = ITIS, c = Catalogue of Life, g = GBIF, b = Bugguide.net
