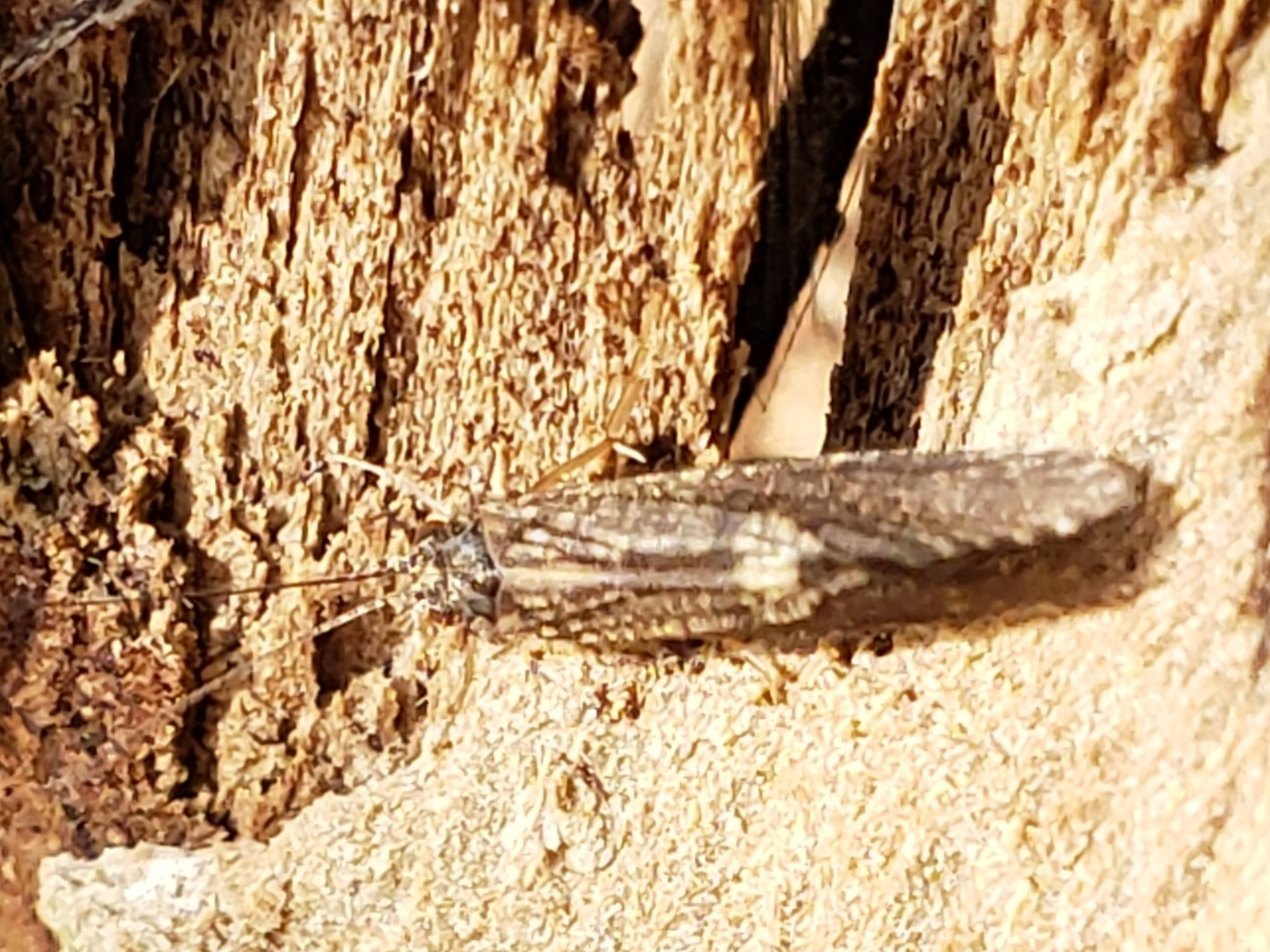
- Adult Arctopsychidae sp

Scientific classification
- Kingdom: Animalia
- Phylum: Arthropoda
- Clade: Pancrustacea
- Class: Insecta
- Order: Trichoptera
- Superfamily: Hydropsychoidea
- Family: Arctopsychidae; McLachlan, 1868

= Arctopsychidae =

Family of caddisflies

The Arctopsychidae are a family of net-spinning caddisflies. The family was described by Robert McLachlan in 1868. Larvae tend to live in clear, cold streams with stony bottoms. The larvae are often filter feeders, and will spin aquatic nets between stones to catch food particles. Adults will then emerge from the water to fly between late May and mid August. Distribution is Holarctic and Oriental.

== Genera ==
- Arctopsyche
- Maesaipsyche
- Parapsyche
