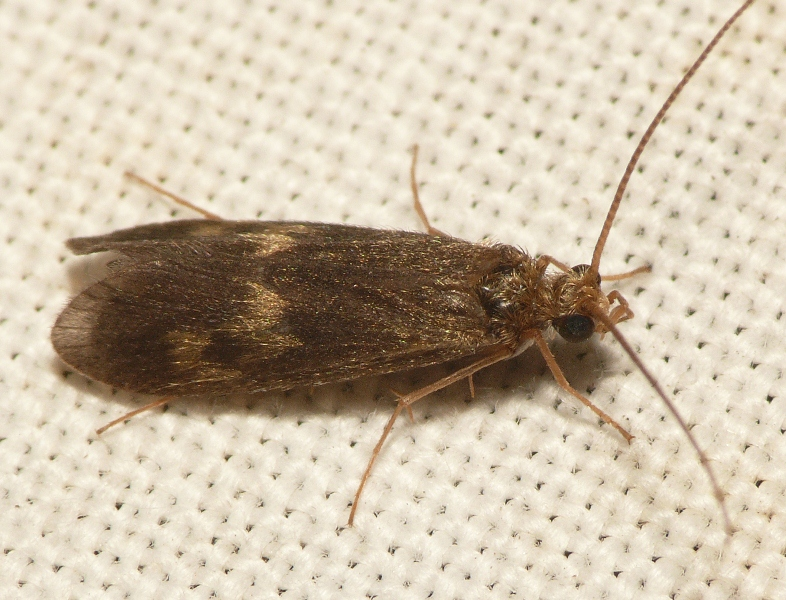
- Neureclipsis bimaculata

Scientific classification
- Kingdom: Animalia
- Phylum: Arthropoda
- Clade: Pancrustacea
- Class: Insecta
- Order: Trichoptera
- Suborder: Annulipalpia
- Superfamily: Hydropsychoidea
- Family: Polycentropodidae; Ulmer, 1903

Subfamilies
- Kambaitipsychinae; Polycentropodinae; Pseudoneureclipsinae

= Polycentropodidae =

Family of caddisflies

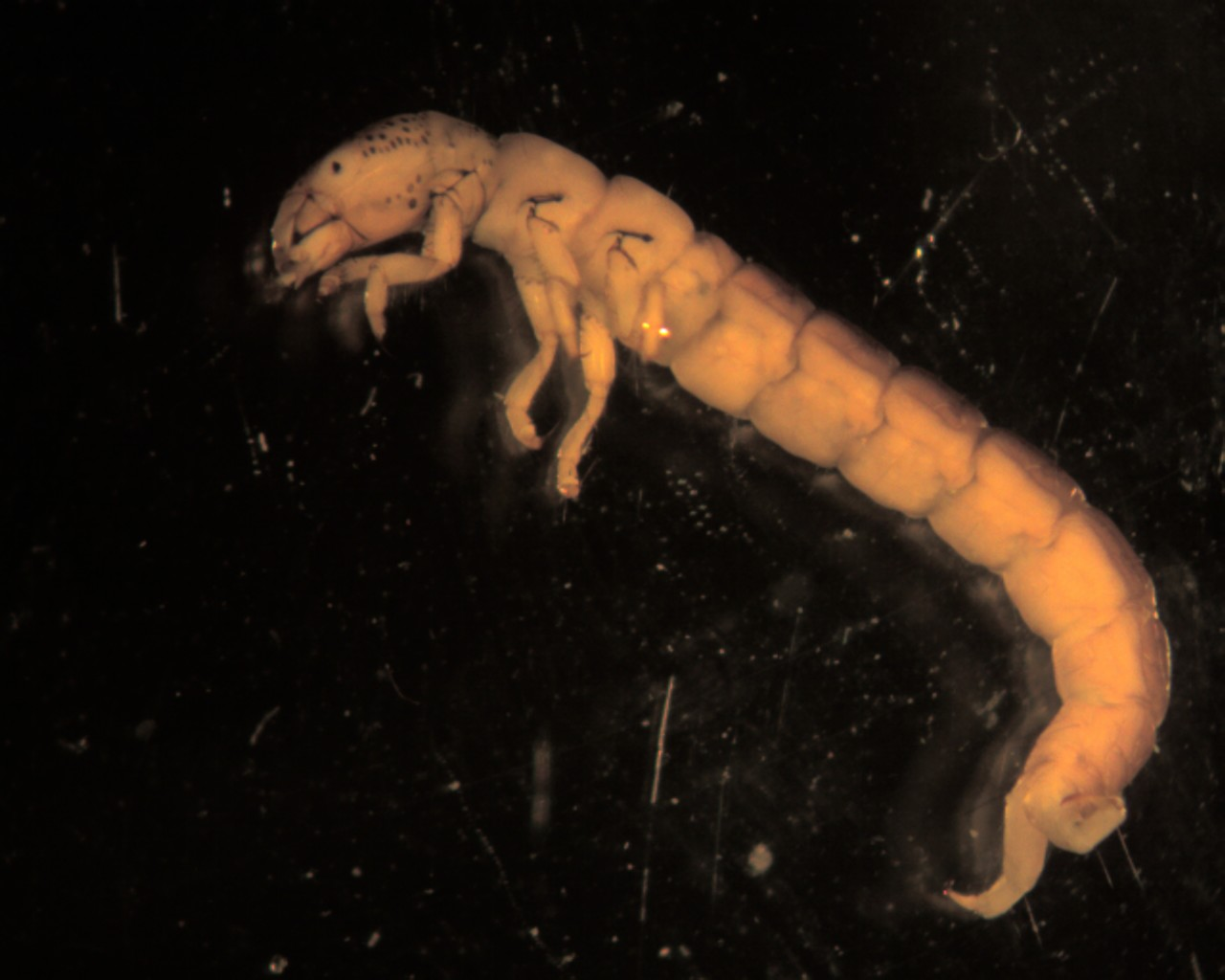

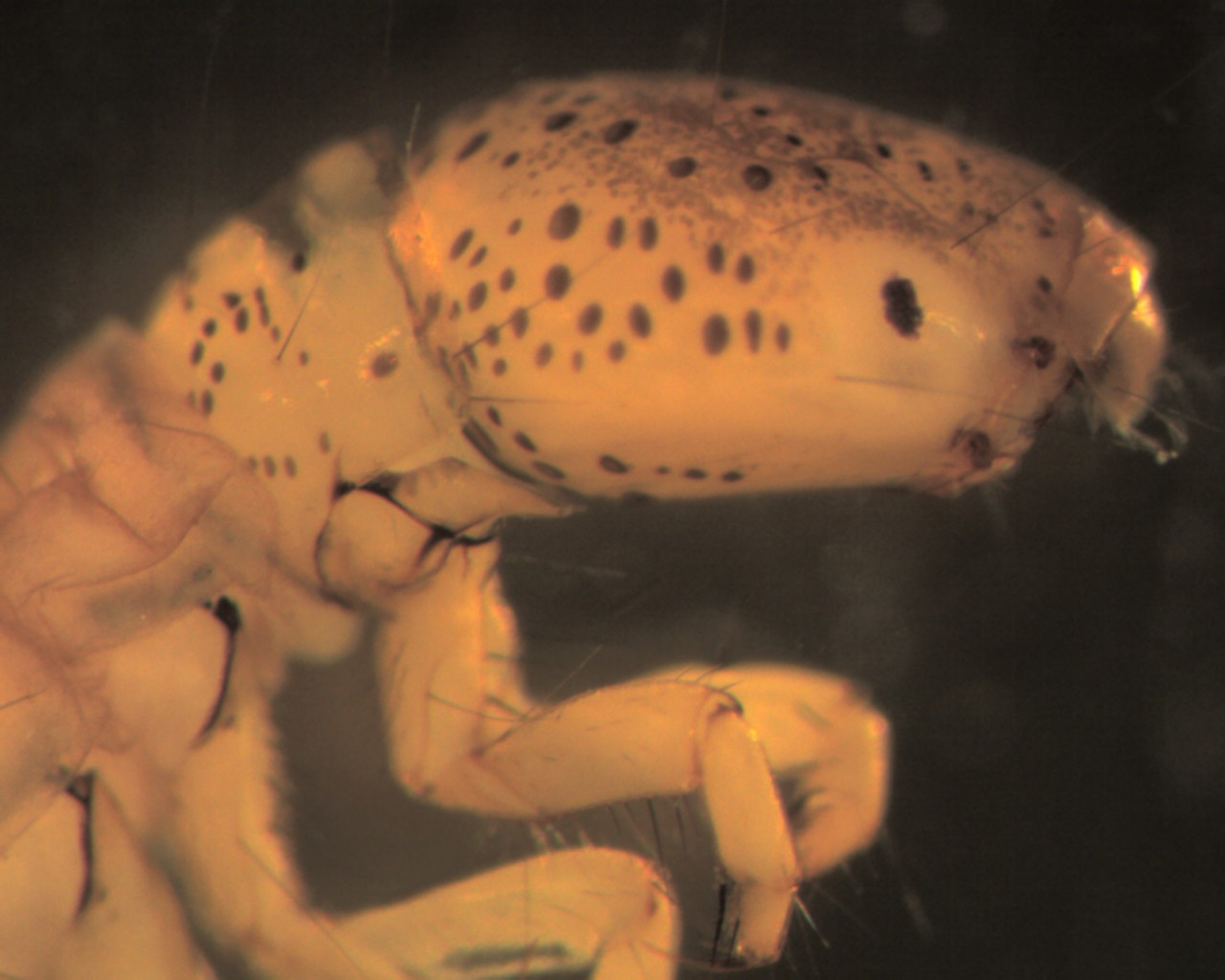
Polycentropus

The Polycentropodidae are a family of trumpet-net and tube-making caddisflies. There are at least 30 genera and 720 described species in Polycentropodidae. The type genus for Polycentropodidae is Polycentropus J. Curtis, 1835.

The larvae of this family construct complex silken tubes in which to live. These are short and flattened, and built in hollows in rocks or other submerged objects. They are surrounded by silken threads stretched across nearby surfaces. The larvae are carnivorous, remaining in the retreat until alerted by a small animal encountering a thread, and then rushing out to attack the prey. Members of the genus Polycentropus make slender, tubular structures among the tangled stems of aquatic plants, being alerted to the presence of prey that encounters the associated silken threads among the plants.

== Genera ==
These 33 genera belong to the family Polycentropodidae:

- Adectophylax Neboiss, 1982^{i c g}
- Antillopsyche Banks, 1941^{i c g}
- Archaeoneureclipsis Ulmer, 1912^{g}
- Archaeopolycentra Botosaneanu & Wichard, 1983^{g}
- Cernotina Ross, 1938^{i c g b}
- Cyrnellus Banks, 1913^{i c g}
- Cyrnodes Ulmer, 1910^{i c g}
- Cyrnopsis Martynov, 1935^{i c g}
- Cyrnus Stephens, 1836^{i c g}
- Derobrochus Scudder, 1885^{g}
- Electrocyrnus Melnitsky & Ivanov, 2010^{g}
- Eoclipsis Sukacheva, 1994^{g}
- Eodipseudopsis Marlier, 1959^{i c g}
- Eoneureclipsis Kimmins, 1955^{i c g}
- Holocentropus McLachlan, 1878^{i c g b}
- Kambaitipsyche Malicky, 1992^{i c g}
- Leptobrochus Scudder, 1890^{g}
- Litobrochus Scudder, 1890^{g}
- Mesobrochus Scudder, 1890^{g}
- Neucentropus Martynov, 1907^{i c g}
- Neureclipsis McLachlan, 1864^{i c g b}
- Neurocentropus Navas, 1918^{i c g}
- Nyctiophylacodes Ulmer, 1912^{g}
- Nyctiophylax Brauer, 1865^{i c g b} (dinky light summer sedges)
- Pahamunaya Schmid, 1958^{i c g}
- Paladicella Scudder, 1890^{g}
- Plectrocentropus Sukacheva, 1994^{g}
- Plectrocnemia Stephens, 1836^{i c g b}
- Plectrocnemiella Mosely, 1934^{i c g}
- Polycentropus Curtis, 1835^{i c g b}
- Polyplectropus Ulmer, 1905^{i c g}
- Pseudoneureclipsis Ulmer, 1913^{i c g}
- Tasmanoplegas Neboiss, 1977^{i c g}

Data sources: i = ITIS, c = Catalogue of Life, g = GBIF, b = Bugguide.net
