= List of Lepidostoma species =

This is a list of 136 species in Lepidostoma, a genus of bizarre caddisflies in the family Lepidostomatidae.

== Lepidostoma species ==
- Lepidostoma acarolum Denning, 1962^{i c g}
- Lepidostoma americanum (Banks, 1897)^{i c g}
- Lepidostoma anorhepes (Neboiss, 1990)^{i c g}
- Lepidostoma apornum Denning, 1949^{i c g}
- Lepidostoma astaneum Denning, 1954^{i c g}
- Lepidostoma aztecum Flint & Bueno-Soria, 1977^{i c g}
- Lepidostoma bakeri Flint, 1965^{i c g}
- Lepidostoma basale (Kolenati, 1848)^{g}
- Lepidostoma baxea Denning, 1958^{i c g}
- Lepidostoma bisculum Weaver & Huisman, 1992^{i c g}
- Lepidostoma bryanti (Banks, 1908)^{i c g}
- Lepidostoma canthum Ross, 1941^{i c g}
- Lepidostoma carolina (Banks, 1911)^{i c g}
- Lepidostoma carrolli Flint, 1958^{i c g}
- Lepidostoma cascadense (Milne, 1936)^{i c g b}
- Lepidostoma castalianum Weaver & Myers, 1998^{i c g}
- Lepidostoma ceratinum Weaver & Andersen, 1995^{i c g}
- Lepidostoma chiriquiensis Holzenthal & Strand, 1992^{i c g}
- Lepidostoma cinereum (Banks, 1899)^{i c g b}
- Lepidostoma compressum Etnier & Way, 1973^{i c g}
- Lepidostoma conjunctum (Banks, 1934)^{i c g}
- Lepidostoma coreanum Kumanski & Weaver, 1992^{g}
- Lepidostoma corollatum Weaver & Huisman, 1992^{i c g}
- Lepidostoma costale (Banks, 1914)^{i c g}
- Lepidostoma cratis Weaver & Huisman, 1992^{i c g}
- Lepidostoma curtipendulum Weaver & Huisman, 1992^{i c g}
- Lepidostoma dafila Bueno-Soria & Contreras-Ramos, 1986^{i c g}
- Lepidostoma deceptivum (Banks, 1907)^{i c g}
- Lepidostoma delongi Ross, 1946^{i c g}
- Lepidostoma denningi Weaver, 1988^{i c g}
- Lepidostoma dulitense (Mosely, 1951)^{i c g}
- Lepidostoma ectopium Holzenthal & Strand, 1992^{i c g}
- Lepidostoma erectum Weaver & Huisman, 1992^{i c g}
- Lepidostoma ermanae Weaver, 1988^{i c g}
- Lepidostoma errigenum Denning, 1954^{i c g}
- Lepidostoma etnieri Weaver, 1988^{i c g}
- Lepidostoma excavatum Flint & Wiggins, 1961^{i c g}
- Lepidostoma ferox Branch^{g}
- Lepidostoma fimbriatum (Pictet, 1865)^{i c g}
- Lepidostoma flinti Wallace & Sherberger, 1972^{i c g}
- Lepidostoma fraternum Mey, 1998^{i c g}
- Lepidostoma frontale (Banks, 1901)^{i c g}
- Lepidostoma frosti (Milne, 1936)^{i c g}
- Lepidostoma ganesa Malicky & Chantaramongkol, 1994^{i c g}
- Lepidostoma gigitaring Weaver & Huisman, 1992^{i c g}
- Lepidostoma glenni Wallace & Sherberger, 1972^{i c g}
- Lepidostoma grande (Banks, 1931)^{i c g}
- Lepidostoma griseum (Banks, 1911)^{i c g}
- Lepidostoma hamatum Weaver & Andersen, 1995^{i c g}
- Lepidostoma hattorii ^{g}
- Lepidostoma heveli Flint & Bueno-Soria, 1977^{i c g}
- Lepidostoma hirtum (Fabricius, 1775)^{i c g}
- Lepidostoma hoodi Ross, 1948^{i c g b}
- Lepidostoma ishigakiense ^{g}
- Lepidostoma jewetti Ross, 1946^{i c g b}
- Lepidostoma knulli Ross, 1946^{i c g}
- Lepidostoma kornmanni Radovanovic, 1932^{i c g}
- Lepidostoma lacinatum Flint, 1967^{i c g}
- Lepidostoma latipenne (Banks, 1905)^{i c g}
- Lepidostoma leonilae Bueno-Soria & Contreras-Ramos, 1986^{i c g}
- Lepidostoma lescheni Bowles, Mathis, & Weaver, 1994^{i c g}
- Lepidostoma libum Ross, 1941^{i c g}
- Lepidostoma licolum Denning, 1975^{i c g}
- Lepidostoma lidderwatense ^{g}
- Lepidostoma lobatum Wallace & Sherberger, 1972^{i c g}
- Lepidostoma lotor Ross, 1946^{i c g}
- Lepidostoma lydia Ross, 1939^{i c g}
- Lepidostoma macroceron Weaver & Andersen, 1995^{i c g}
- Lepidostoma medium (Banks, 1934)^{i c g}
- Lepidostoma memotong Weaver & Huisman, 1992^{i c g}
- Lepidostoma mexicanum (Banks, 1901)^{i c g}
- Lepidostoma mitchelli Flint & Wiggins, 1961^{i c g}
- Lepidostoma modestum (Banks, 1905)^{i c g}
- Lepidostoma montatan Malicky & Chantaramongkol, 1994^{i c g}
- Lepidostoma morsei Weaver, 1988^{i c g}
- Lepidostoma nayarkot Malicky & Chantaramongkol, 1994^{i c g}
- Lepidostoma neboissi Weaver & Huisman, 1992^{i c g}
- Lepidostoma niigataense ^{g}
- Lepidostoma oaxacense Bueno-Soria & Contreras-Ramos, 1986^{i c g}
- Lepidostoma octolobium Weaver & Huisman, 1992^{i c g}
- Lepidostoma ojanum Weaver & Myers, 1998^{i c g}
- Lepidostoma ontario Ross, 1941^{i c g}
- Lepidostoma oreion Weaver & Huisman, 1992^{i c g}
- Lepidostoma ormeum Ross, 1946^{i c g}
- Lepidostoma ozarkense Flint & Harp, 1990^{i c g}
- Lepidostoma palawanensis Malicky & Chantaramongkol, 1994^{i c g}
- Lepidostoma pedang Weaver & Huisman, 1992^{i c g}
- Lepidostoma pendulum Weaver & Huisman, 1992^{i c g}
- Lepidostoma pictile (Banks, 1899)^{i c g}
- Lepidostoma pilosum Navás, 1928^{i c g}
- Lepidostoma pluviale (Milne, 1936)^{i c g}
- Lepidostoma podagrum (McLachlan, 1871)^{i c g}
- Lepidostoma polylepidum Holzenthal & Strand, 1992^{i c g}
- Lepidostoma prominens (Banks, 1930)^{i c g}
- Lepidostoma pseudabruptum Malicky & Chantaramongkol, 1994^{i c g}
- Lepidostoma quaternarium Weaver & Huisman, 1992^{i c g}
- Lepidostoma quercinum Ross, 1938^{i c g}
- Lepidostoma quila Bueno-Soria & Padilla-Ramirez, 1981^{i c g}
- Lepidostoma ratanapruksi Malicky & Chantaramongkol, 1994^{i c g}
- Lepidostoma rayneri Ross, 1941^{i c g}
- Lepidostoma recinum Denning, 1954^{i c g}
- Lepidostoma rectangulare Flint, 1967^{i c g}
- Lepidostoma reimoseri Flint & Bueno-Soria, 1977^{i c g}
- Lepidostoma reosum Denning, 1954^{i c g b}
- Lepidostoma roafi (Milne, 1936)^{i c g}
- Lepidostoma sackeni (Banks, 1936)^{i c g}
- Lepidostoma sainii ^{g}
- Lepidostoma schwendingeri Malicky & Chantaramongkol, 1994^{i c g}
- Lepidostoma serratum Flint & Wiggins, 1961^{i c g}
- Lepidostoma sibuyana Malicky & Chantaramongkol, 1994^{i c g}
- Lepidostoma simalungensis Malicky & Chantaramongkol, 1994^{i c g}
- Lepidostoma sommermanae Ross, 1946^{i c g b}
- Lepidostoma spicatum Denning, 1954^{i c g}
- Lepidostoma steinhauseri Flint & Bueno-Soria, 1977^{i c g}
- Lepidostoma stigma Banks, 1907^{i c g}
- Lepidostoma stylifer Flint & Wiggins, 1961^{i c g}
- Lepidostoma talamancense Flint & Bueno-Soria, 1977^{i c g}
- Lepidostoma tapanti Holzenthal & Strand, 1992^{i c g}
- Lepidostoma taurocorne Yang & Weaver, 2002^{g}
- Lepidostoma tectore (Neboiss, 1991)^{i c g}
- Lepidostoma tenellum Weaver & Huisman, 1992^{i c g}
- Lepidostoma tenerifensis Malicky, 1992^{i c g}
- Lepidostoma tibiale (Carpenter, 1933)^{i c g}
- Lepidostoma togatum (Hagen, 1861)^{i c g b}
- Lepidostoma trilobatum ^{g}
- Lepidostoma uncinatum Weaver & Huisman, 1992^{i c g}
- Lepidostoma unicolor (Banks, 1911)^{i c g}
- Lepidostoma varithi Malicky & Chantaramongkol, 1994^{i c g}
- Lepidostoma vernale (Banks, 1897)^{i c g b}
- Lepidostoma verodum Ross, 1948^{i c g}
- Lepidostoma weaveri Harris, 1986^{i c g}
- Lepidostoma wliense Weaver & Andersen, 1995^{i c g}
- Lepidostoma xolotl Holzenthal & Strand, 1992^{i c g}
- Lepidostoma xylochos (Neboiss, 1991)^{i c g}
- Lepidostoma yuwanense ^{g}
- Lepidostoma zimmermanni Malicky & Chantaramongkol, 1994^{i c g}

Data sources: i = ITIS, c = Catalogue of Life, g = GBIF, b = Bugguide.net
