= Vitae Kite =

American entomologist (1867–1940)

Vitae Arminta Kite
- Born: May 21, 1867; Newton County, Missouri
- Died: February 13, 1940 (aged 72); Hollister, Missouri
- Other names: Vitae Arminta Powers
- Occupations: Homemaker; Entomologist
- Known for: recording insects in Missouri
- Notable work: A Catalogue of Ozark butterflies, Lake Taneycomo Region, Missouri

Vitae Kite (May 21, 1867 – February 13, 1940) was an American entomologist who specialised in Lepidoptera.

== Biography ==
Kite was born Vitae Arminta Powers at Neosho, Newton County, Missouri, on May 21, 1867. Kite's parents were Eli Powers (1817–1875), a grocer, and Angeline Matilda Powers (née Wormington, later Jackson, 1835–1909). Kite's father, Eli, died in 1875 when she was seven years old, and her mother, Angeline, remarried to Robert William Jackson (1829–1912). Kite lived with her mother and stepfather for a period in Eureka Springs, Arkansas.

Kite married Robert B. Kite (1857–1943), a real estate owner, in 1883 when she was 16 years old. The couple had four children and remained married until Vitae Kite died on February 13, 1940.

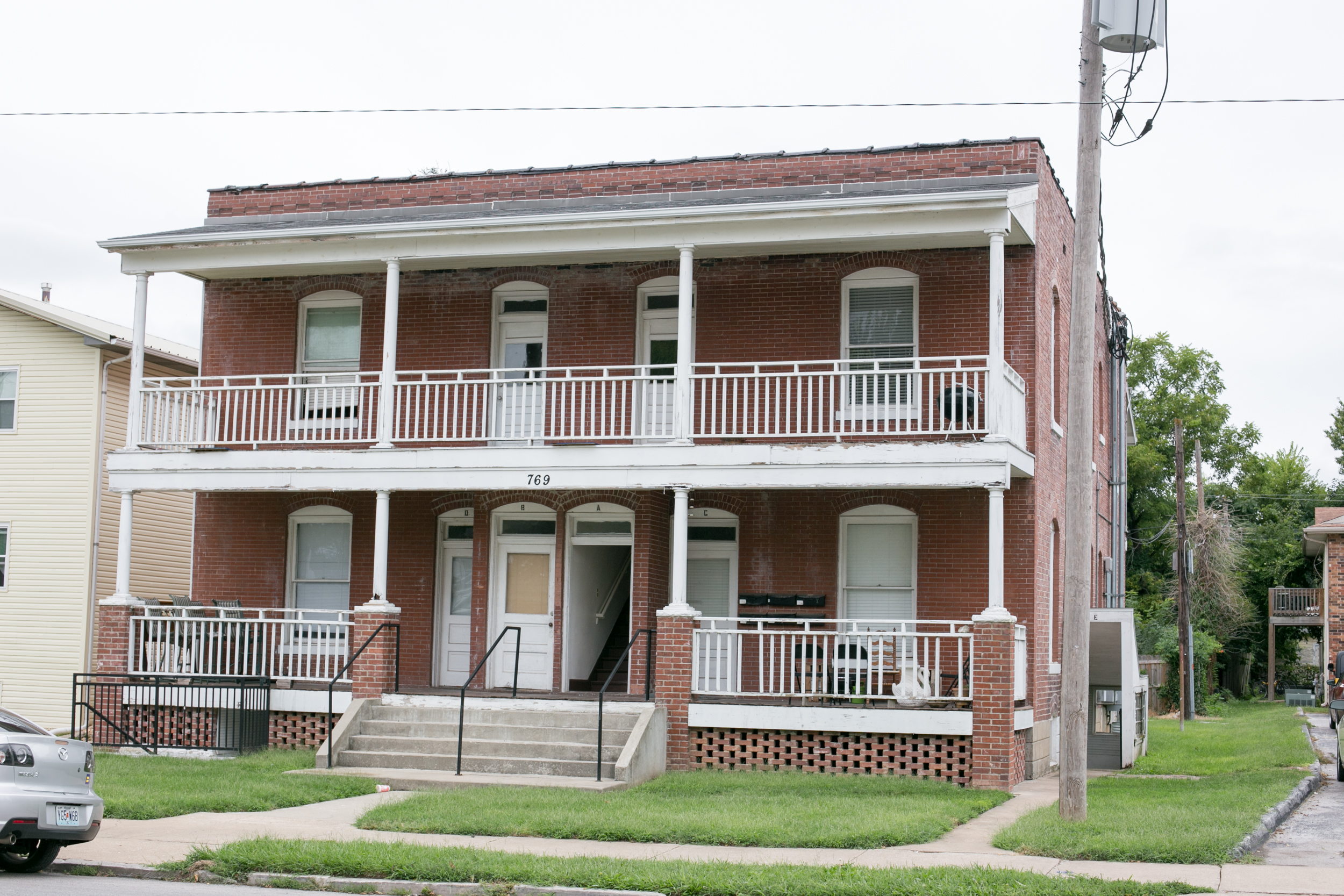
The Historic Robert and Vitae Kite Apartment Building, at 769–771 South Ave., Springfield, Missouri, in September 2014

In 1906 the Kites constructed a brick-built apartment building now known as the Historic Robert and Vitae Kite Apartment Building in Springfield, Missouri, which became their home until 1921. In 2004 the Kite Building was added to the U.S. National Register of Historic Places.

== Entomology and other natural history work ==
Kite began entomological work later in her life: She was known for recording Lepidoptera occurrence data in her home state, Missouri. Kite published "A Catalogue of Ozark butterflies, Lake Taneycomo Region, Missouri" in the February 1934 Issue of Entomological News. Fifteen years later, in 1949, although some species were still subject to confirmation, Kite's list was then the only published list for butterflies from Southern Missouri.

Kite was posthumously credited with contributing Trichoptera data to Herbert Holdsworth Ross (1908–1978) of the Illinois Natural History Survey, which included Kite collecting the Type material for the species Neotrichia kitae which was named in her honour by Ross in 1941. Kite also collected the Holotype material of Oecetis nocturna at Hollister in 1938, a species which was described by Ross in 1966.

Kite contributed an ornithological observation to the Journal Bird Lore in 1925, regarding a fearless tufted titmouse (Baeolophus bicolor) which had landed on her head and gathered her hair as nesting material.

After her death, Kite's personal collection of around 10,000 butterflies containing local and exotic specimens was donated to the School of the Ozarks.
