= Agnidra tanyospinosa =

Scientific classification
- Domain: Eukaryota
- Kingdom: Animalia
- Phylum: Arthropoda
- Class: Insecta
- Order: Lepidoptera
- Family: Drepanidae
- Genus: Agnidra
- Species: A. tanyospinosa

Binomial name
- Agnidra tanyospinosa Chu & Wang, 1988

Species of hook-tip moth

Agnidra tanyospinosa is a moth in the family Drepanidae. It was described by Hong-Fu Chu and Lin-Yao Wang in 1988. It is found in Guangdong, China.

The length of the forewings is about 17 mm. Adults are similar to Agnidra corticata, but have whitish patches on the cells of the wings.
