= Amiocentrus aspilus =

Scientific classification
- Kingdom: Animalia
- Phylum: Arthropoda
- Clade: Pancrustacea
- Class: Insecta
- Order: Trichoptera
- Family: Brachycentridae
- Genus: Amiocentrus
- Species: A. aspilus

Binomial name
- Amiocentrus aspilus (Ross, 1938)

Species of caddisfly

Amiocentrus aspilus is a species of humpless casemaker caddisfly in the family Brachycentridae. It is found in North America.
