= Agnidra ataxia =

Scientific classification
- Domain: Eukaryota
- Kingdom: Animalia
- Phylum: Arthropoda
- Class: Insecta
- Order: Lepidoptera
- Family: Drepanidae
- Genus: Agnidra
- Species: A. ataxia

Binomial name
- Agnidra ataxia Chu & Wang, 1988

Species of hook-tip moth

Agnidra ataxia is a moth in the family Drepanidae. It was described by Hong-Fu Chu and Lin-Yao Wang in 1988. It is found in Yunnan, China.

The length of the forewings is about 15 mm. Adults are similar to Agnidra fulvior, but the markings on the wings are less clear.
