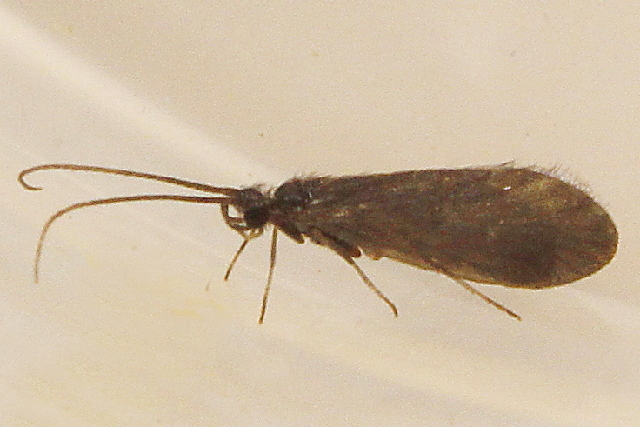

Scientific classification
- Kingdom: Animalia
- Phylum: Arthropoda
- Clade: Pancrustacea
- Class: Insecta
- Order: Trichoptera
- Family: Brachycentridae
- Genus: Micrasema
- Species: M. bactro

Binomial name
- Micrasema bactro Ross, 1938

= Micrasema bactro =

Species of caddisfly

Micrasema bactro is a species of humpless casemaker caddisfly in the family Brachycentridae. It is found in North America.
