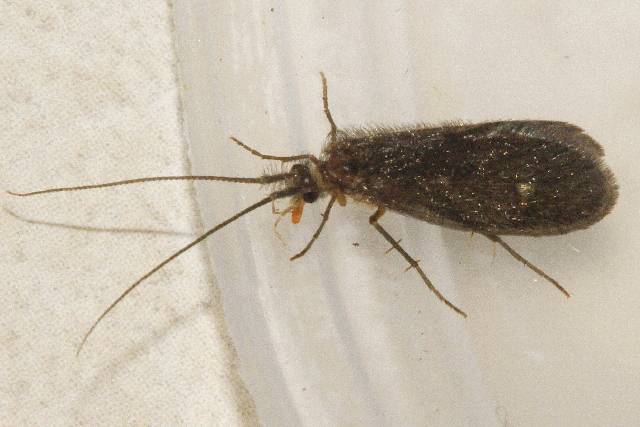

Scientific classification
- Kingdom: Animalia
- Phylum: Arthropoda
- Clade: Pancrustacea
- Class: Insecta
- Order: Trichoptera
- Family: Lepidostomatidae
- Genus: Lepidostoma
- Species: L. jewetti

Binomial name
- Lepidostoma jewetti Ross, 1946

= Lepidostoma jewetti =

Species of caddisfly

Lepidostoma jewetti is a species of bizarre caddisfly in the family Lepidostomatidae. It is found in North America.
