= Micrasema wataga =

Scientific classification
- Kingdom: Animalia
- Phylum: Arthropoda
- Clade: Pancrustacea
- Class: Insecta
- Order: Trichoptera
- Family: Brachycentridae
- Genus: Micrasema
- Species: M. wataga

Binomial name
- Micrasema wataga Ross, 1938

Species of caddisfly

Micrasema wataga is a species of humpless casemaker caddisfly in the family Brachycentridae. It is found in North America.
