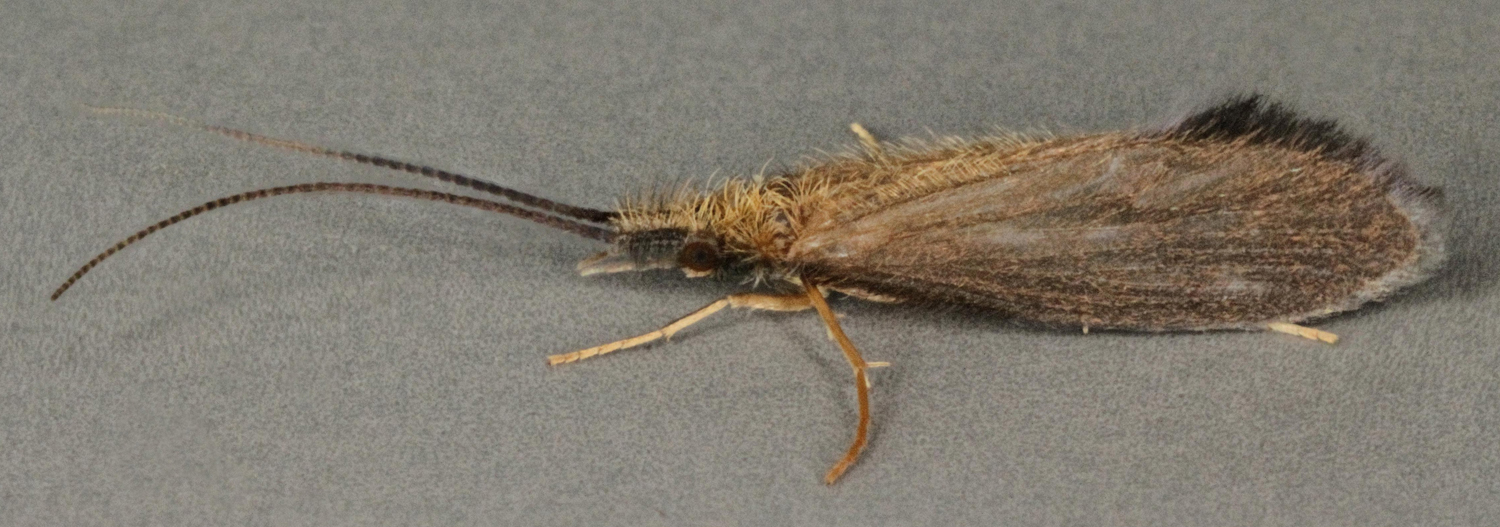
- Crunoecia irrorata

Scientific classification
- Kingdom: Animalia
- Phylum: Arthropoda
- Clade: Pancrustacea
- Class: Insecta
- Order: Trichoptera
- Family: Lepidostomatidae
- Subfamily: Theliopsychinae
- Genus: Crunoecia; McLachlan, 1876

= Crunoecia =

Genus of insects

Crunoecia is a genus of caddisflies in the family Lepidostomatidae.

The species of this genus are found in Europe.

== Species ==
The following species are recognised in the genus Crunoecia:

- Crunoecia fortuna Malicky, 2002
- Crunoecia irrorata (Curtis, 1834)
- Crunoecia kempnyi Morton, 1901
- Crunoecia monospina Botosaneanu, 1960
