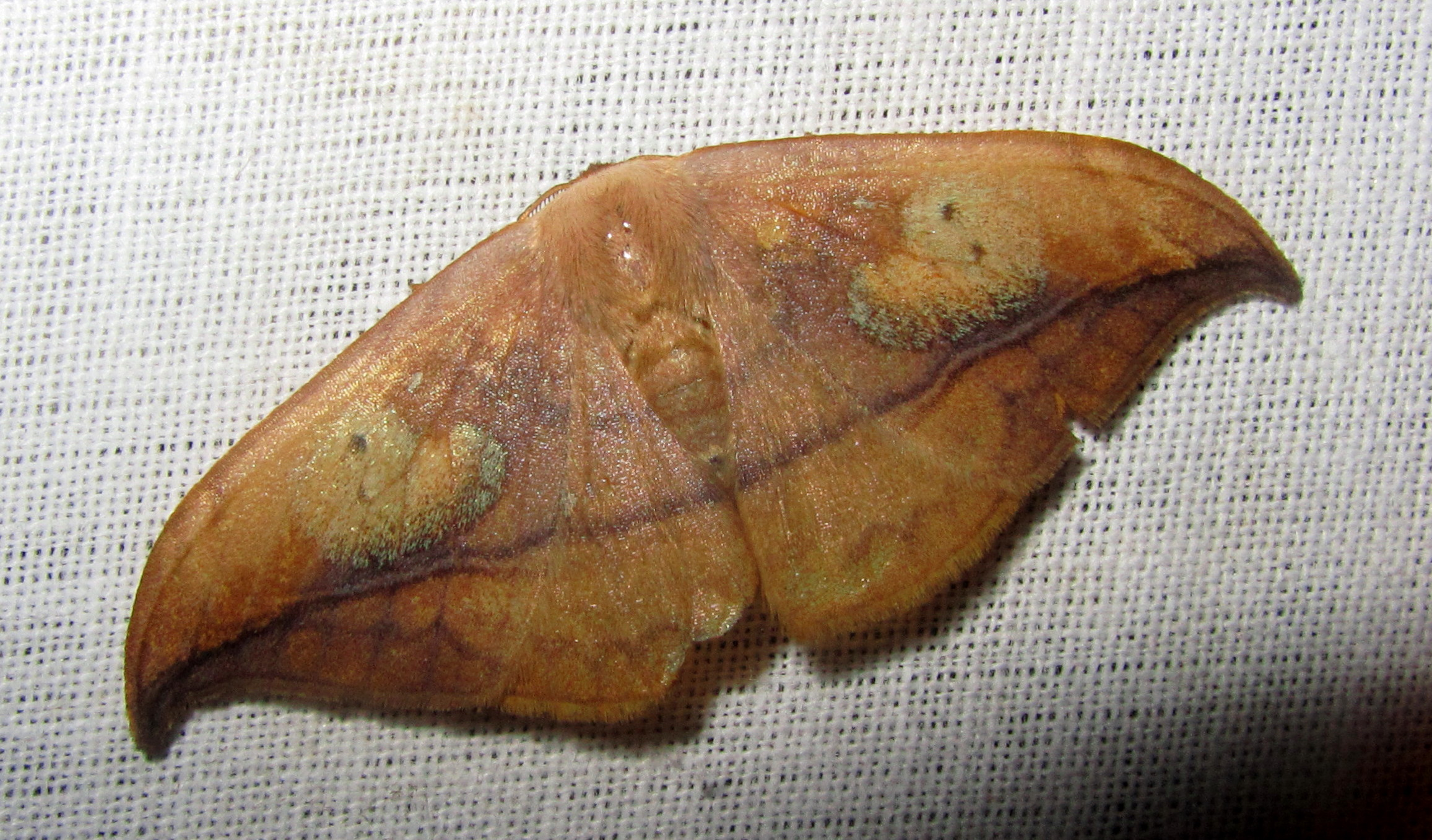

Scientific classification
- Domain: Eukaryota
- Kingdom: Animalia
- Phylum: Arthropoda
- Class: Insecta
- Order: Lepidoptera
- Family: Drepanidae
- Genus: Agnidra
- Species: A. vinacea

Binomial name
- Agnidra vinacea (Moore, 1879)

Synonyms
- Drepana vinacea Moore, 1879; Albara vinacea; Albara birmanica Bryk, 1943

= Agnidra vinacea =

Species of hook-tip moth

Agnidra vinacea is a moth in the family Drepanidae. It was described by Frederic Moore in 1879. It is found in Sikkim, north-eastern India and north-eastern Myanmar.

The wingspan is 17.5–21 mm for males and 19.5–23.5 mm for females. Adults are similar to Agnidra fuscilinea.
