= Didymana =

Scientific classification
- Kingdom: Animalia
- Phylum: Arthropoda
- Class: Insecta
- Order: Lepidoptera
- Family: Drepanidae
- Subfamily: Drepaninae
- Genus: Didymana; Bryk, 1943

Moth genus in family Drepanidae

Didymana is a genus of moths belonging to the subfamily Drepaninae.

== Species ==
- Didymana bidens Leech, 1890
- Didymana ancepsa Chu & Wang, 1987
- Didymana brunea Chu & Wang, 1987
