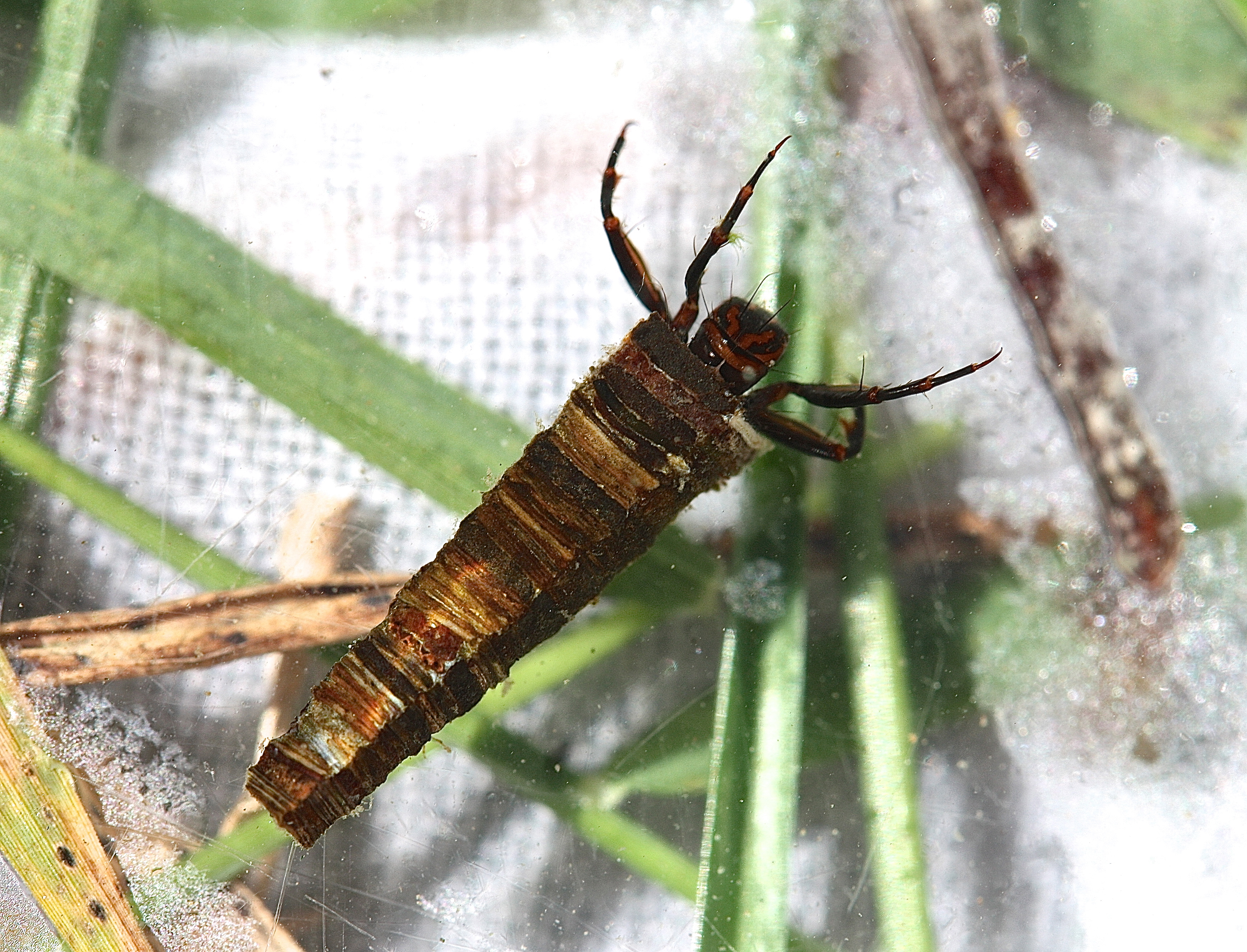

Scientific classification
- Kingdom: Animalia
- Phylum: Arthropoda
- Clade: Pancrustacea
- Class: Insecta
- Order: Trichoptera
- Family: Brachycentridae
- Genus: Brachycentrus
- Species: B. appalachia

Binomial name
- Brachycentrus appalachia Flint, 1984

= Brachycentrus appalachia =

Species of caddisfly

Brachycentrus appalachia is a species of humpless casemaker caddisfly in the family Brachycentridae. It is found in North America.
