= Brachycentrus occidentalis =

Scientific classification
- Kingdom: Animalia
- Phylum: Arthropoda
- Clade: Pancrustacea
- Class: Insecta
- Order: Trichoptera
- Family: Brachycentridae
- Genus: Brachycentrus
- Species: B. occidentalis

Binomial name
- Brachycentrus occidentalis Banks, 1911

Species of caddisfly

Brachycentrus occidentalis is a species of humpless casemaker caddisfly in the family Brachycentridae. It is found in North America.
