= Agnidra argypha =

Scientific classification
- Domain: Eukaryota
- Kingdom: Animalia
- Phylum: Arthropoda
- Class: Insecta
- Order: Lepidoptera
- Family: Drepanidae
- Genus: Agnidra
- Species: A. argypha

Binomial name
- Agnidra argypha Chu & Wang, 1988

Species of hook-tip moth

Agnidra argypha is a moth in the family Drepanidae. It was described by Hong-Fu Chu and Lin-Yao Wang in 1988. It is found in Yunnan, China.

The length of the forewings is 9–10 mm. Both wings have a silvery colour, with two oblique black lines on the forewings, as well as four or five whitish spots in the cell.
