= Amiocentrus =

Scientific classification
- Kingdom: Animalia
- Phylum: Arthropoda
- Clade: Pancrustacea
- Class: Insecta
- Order: Trichoptera
- Family: Brachycentridae
- Genus: Amiocentrus; Ross, 1938

Genus of caddisflies

Amiocentrus is a genus of humpless casemaker caddisflies in the family Brachycentridae. There are at least two described species in Amiocentrus.

== Species ==
These two species belong to the genus Amiocentrus:

- Amiocentrus aspilus (Ross, 1938)
- Amiocentrus tessellatum (Bradley, 1924)
