= Lepidostoma togatum =

Scientific classification
- Kingdom: Animalia
- Phylum: Arthropoda
- Clade: Pancrustacea
- Class: Insecta
- Order: Trichoptera
- Family: Lepidostomatidae
- Genus: Lepidostoma
- Species: L. togatum

Binomial name
- Lepidostoma togatum (Hagen, 1861)

Synonyms
- Lepidostoma canadense (Banks, 1899); Lepidostoma pallidum (Banks, 1897); Mormomyia togatum Hagen, 1861; Pristosilo canadensis Banks, 1899; Silo pallidus Banks, 1897

Species of caddisfly

Lepidostoma togatum is a species of bizarre caddisfly in the family Lepidostomatidae. It is found in North America.
