= Lepidostoma vernale =

Scientific classification
- Kingdom: Animalia
- Phylum: Arthropoda
- Clade: Pancrustacea
- Class: Insecta
- Order: Trichoptera
- Family: Lepidostomatidae
- Genus: Lepidostoma
- Species: L. vernale

Binomial name
- Lepidostoma vernale (Banks, 1897)

Synonyms
- Mormomyia vernalis Banks, 1897

Species of caddisfly

Lepidostoma vernale is a species of bizarre caddisfly in the family Lepidostomatidae. It is found in North America.
