= Micrasema rusticum =

Scientific classification
- Kingdom: Animalia
- Phylum: Arthropoda
- Clade: Pancrustacea
- Class: Insecta
- Order: Trichoptera
- Family: Brachycentridae
- Genus: Micrasema
- Species: M. rusticum

Binomial name
- Micrasema rusticum (Hagen, 1868)

Synonyms
- Amiocentrus falcatum (Banks, 1914); Dasystoma rusticum Hagen, 1868

Species of caddisfly

Micrasema rusticum is a species of humpless casemaker caddisfly in the family Brachycentridae. It is found in North America.
