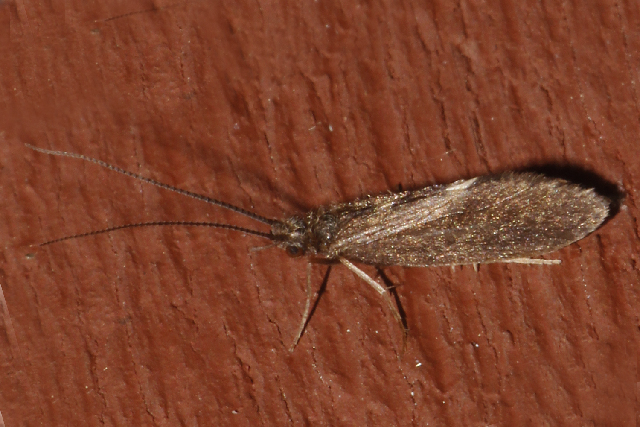

Scientific classification
- Kingdom: Animalia
- Phylum: Arthropoda
- Clade: Pancrustacea
- Class: Insecta
- Order: Trichoptera
- Family: Lepidostomatidae
- Genus: Lepidostoma
- Species: L. cinereum

Binomial name
- Lepidostoma cinereum (Banks, 1899)

Synonyms
- Lepidostoma strophis Ross, 1938

= Lepidostoma cinereum =

Species of caddisfly

Lepidostoma cinereum is a species of bizarre caddisfly in the family Lepidostomatidae. It is found in North America.
