= Brachycentrus lateralis =

Scientific classification
- Kingdom: Animalia
- Phylum: Arthropoda
- Clade: Pancrustacea
- Class: Insecta
- Order: Trichoptera
- Family: Brachycentridae
- Genus: Brachycentrus
- Species: B. lateralis

Binomial name
- Brachycentrus lateralis (Say, 1823)

Synonyms
- Brachycentrus lutescens (Provancher, 1877); Phryganea lateralis Say, 1823; Sphinctogaster lutescens Provancher, 1877

Species of caddisfly

Brachycentrus lateralis is a species of humpless casemaker caddisfly in the family Brachycentridae. It is found in North America.
