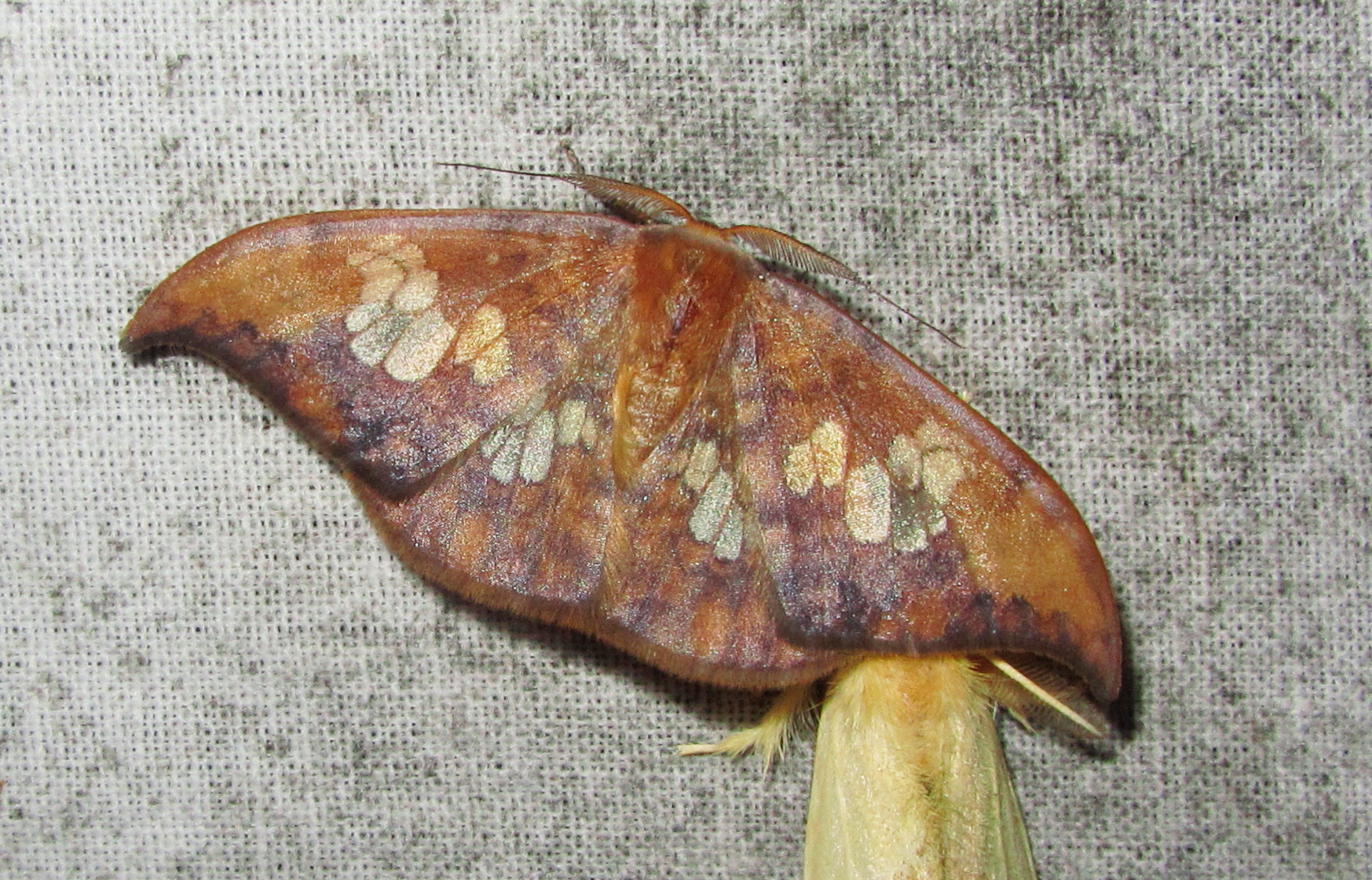
- Agnidra specularia

Scientific classification
- Domain: Eukaryota
- Kingdom: Animalia
- Phylum: Arthropoda
- Class: Insecta
- Order: Lepidoptera
- Family: Drepanidae
- Tribe: Drepanini
- Genus: Agnidra; Moore, [1868]

Synonyms
- Zanclalbara Inoue, 1962

= Agnidra =

Moth genus in family Drepanidae

Agnidra is a genus of moths belonging to the subfamily Drepaninae.

== Species ==
- Agnidra alextoba Buchsbaum, 2000
- Agnidra argypha Chu & Wang, 1988
- Agnidra ataxia Chu & Wang, 1988
- Agnidra corticata Warren, 1922
- Agnidra discispilaria Moore, 1867
- Agnidra fenestra Leech, 1898
- Agnidra fulvior Watson, 1968
- Agnidra furva Watson, 1968
- Agnidra fuscilinea Watson, 1961
- Agnidra hoenei Watson, 1968
- Agnidra scabiosa Butler, 1877
- Agnidra specularia Walker, 1860
- Agnidra tanyospinosa Chu & Wang, 1988
- Agnidra tigrina Chu & Wang, 1988
- Agnidra vinacea Moore, 1879
