= Brachycentrus americanus =

Scientific classification
- Kingdom: Animalia
- Phylum: Arthropoda
- Clade: Pancrustacea
- Class: Insecta
- Order: Trichoptera
- Family: Brachycentridae
- Genus: Brachycentrus
- Species: B. americanus

Binomial name
- Brachycentrus americanus (Banks, 1899)

Synonyms
- Oligoplectrum amercanum Banks, 1899

Species of caddisfly

Brachycentrus americanus is a species of humpless casemaker caddisfly in the family Brachycentridae. It is found in North America. It is most prolific in the West and Midwest of North America in July and August.
