= Agnidra scabiosa =

Scientific classification
- Kingdom: Animalia
- Phylum: Arthropoda
- Clade: Pancrustacea
- Class: Insecta
- Order: Lepidoptera
- Family: Drepanidae
- Genus: Agnidra
- Species: A. scabiosa

Binomial name
- Agnidra scabiosa (Butler, 1877)

Synonyms
- Drepana scabiosa Butler, 1877; Albara scabiosa; Zanclalbara scabiosa; Albara scabiosa fixseni Bryk, 1949

Species of hook-tip moth

Agnidra scabiosa is a moth in the family Drepanidae. It was described by Arthur Gardiner Butler in 1877. It is found in south-eastern Russia, Korea, Japan and China.

The wingspan is 14-17.5 mm for males and 17.5–20 mm for females. Adults are similar to Agnidra fuscilinea, but have a distinctive colour pattern of the wings.

The larvae feed on Quercus and Castanea species.

== Subspecies ==
- Agnidra scabiosa scabiosa (Japan, south-eastern Russia)
- Agnidra scabiosa fixseni (Bryk, 1949) (Korea, China: Manchuria, Zhejing, Hunan, Hubei, Jiangsu)
