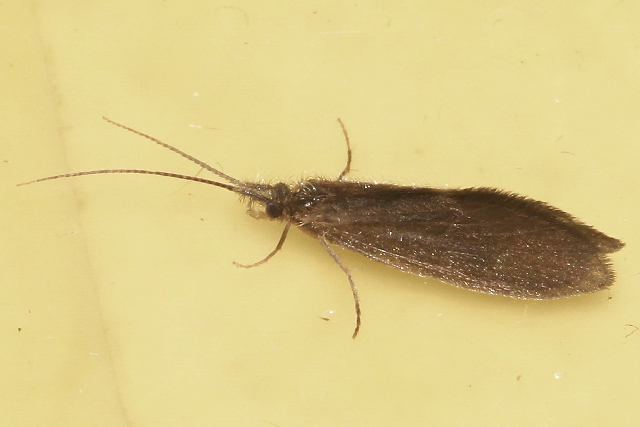

Scientific classification
- Kingdom: Animalia
- Phylum: Arthropoda
- Clade: Pancrustacea
- Class: Insecta
- Order: Trichoptera
- Family: Lepidostomatidae
- Genus: Lepidostoma
- Species: L. cascadense

Binomial name
- Lepidostoma cascadense (Milne, 1936)

Synonyms
- Jenortha cascadensis Milne, 1936; Lepidostoma mira Denning, 1954

= Lepidostoma cascadense =

Species of caddisfly

Lepidostoma cascadense is a species of bizarre caddisfly in the family Lepidostomatidae. It is found in North America.
