= Didymana brunea =

Scientific classification
- Kingdom: Animalia
- Phylum: Arthropoda
- Class: Insecta
- Order: Lepidoptera
- Family: Drepanidae
- Genus: Didymana
- Species: D. brunea

Binomial name
- Didymana brunea Chu & Wang, 1987

Species of hook-tip moth

Didymana brunea is a moth in the family Drepanidae. It was described by Hong-Fu Chu and Lin-Yao Wang in 1987. It is found in China.
