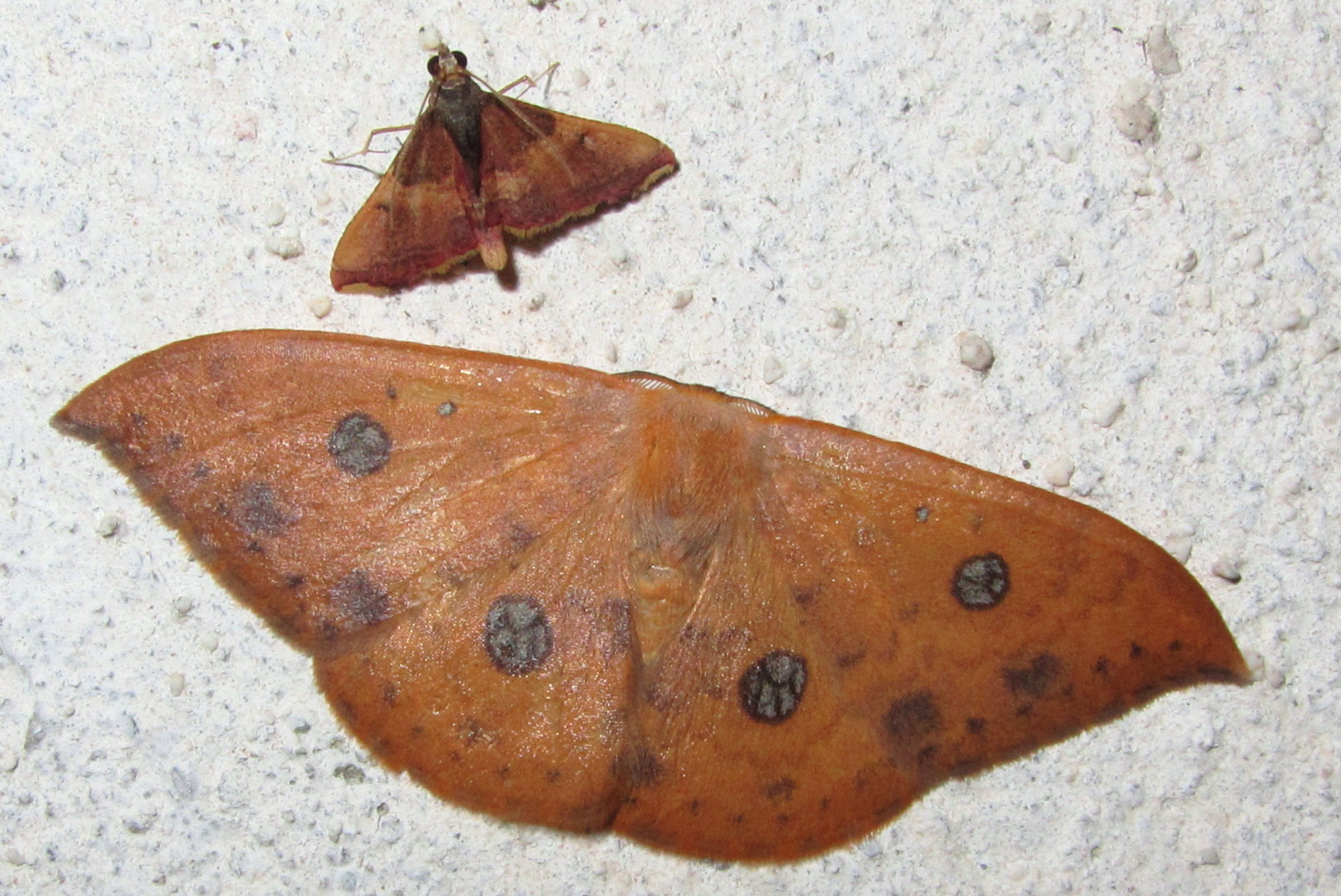

Scientific classification
- Kingdom: Animalia
- Phylum: Arthropoda
- Clade: Pancrustacea
- Class: Insecta
- Order: Lepidoptera
- Family: Drepanidae
- Genus: Agnidra
- Species: A. discispilaria

Binomial name
- Agnidra discispilaria Moore, 1867

Synonyms
- Albara discispilaria; Drepana discispilaria; Agnidra usta Butler, 1886; Albara magnidiscata Warren, 1922; Albara discispilaria macularis Bryk, 1943

= Agnidra discispilaria =

Species of hook-tip moth

Agnidra discispilaria is a moth in the family Drepanidae. It was described by Frederic Moore in 1867. It is found in north-eastern India, Sikkim and Thailand.

The wingspan is 19–23 mm for males and 21.5-22.5 mm for females. The wings are dull pale sienna reddish, crossed by numerous ill-defined irregular greyish-brown lines. The external border and angle of the forewings is clouded with the same colour. All wings have a dark rounded slate-grey spot at the inferior angle of the discoidal cell. There are some greenish-white scales in each of these spots.
