= Adicrophleps =

Scientific classification
- Kingdom: Animalia
- Phylum: Arthropoda
- Clade: Pancrustacea
- Class: Insecta
- Order: Trichoptera
- Family: Brachycentridae
- Genus: Adicrophleps; Flint, 1965
- Species: A. hitchcocki

Binomial name
- Adicrophleps hitchcocki Flint, 1965

Genus of insects

Adicrophleps is a genus of humpless casemaker caddisflies in the family Brachycentridae. There is one described species in Adicrophleps, A. hitchcocki.
