= Agnidra furva =

Scientific classification
- Domain: Eukaryota
- Kingdom: Animalia
- Phylum: Arthropoda
- Class: Insecta
- Order: Lepidoptera
- Family: Drepanidae
- Genus: Agnidra
- Species: A. furva

Binomial name
- Agnidra furva Watson, 1968

Species of hook-tip moth

Agnidra furva is a moth in the family Drepanidae. It was described by Watson in 1968. It is found in China (Yunnan).
