= Theliopsychinae =

Scientific classification
- Domain: Eukaryota
- Kingdom: Animalia
- Phylum: Arthropoda
- Class: Insecta
- Order: Trichoptera
- Family: Lepidostomatidae
- Subfamily: Theliopsychinae; Weaver, 1993

Genera
- Crunoecia McLachlan, 1876; Martynomyia Fischer, 1970; Theliopsyche Banks, 1911; Zephyropsyche Weaver, 1993

Subfamily of insects

Theliopsychinae is a subfamily of caddisflies belonging to the family Lepidostomatidae.
