= Agnidra fenestra =

Scientific classification
- Domain: Eukaryota
- Kingdom: Animalia
- Phylum: Arthropoda
- Class: Insecta
- Order: Lepidoptera
- Family: Drepanidae
- Genus: Agnidra
- Species: A. fenestra

Binomial name
- Agnidra fenestra (Leech, 1898)

Synonyms
- Drepana fenestra Leech, 1898

Species of hook-tip moth

Agnidra fenestra is a moth in the family Drepanidae. It was described by John Henry Leech in 1898. It is found in north-eastern Myanmar and the Chinese provinces of Sichuan, Yunnan and Shaanxi.
