= Agnidra hoenei =

Scientific classification
- Domain: Eukaryota
- Kingdom: Animalia
- Phylum: Arthropoda
- Class: Insecta
- Order: Lepidoptera
- Family: Drepanidae
- Genus: Agnidra
- Species: A. hoenei

Binomial name
- Agnidra hoenei Watson, 1968

Species of hook-tip moth

Agnidra hoenei is a moth in the family Drepanidae. It was described by Watson in 1968. It is found in China (Yunnan).
