= Didymana bidens =

Scientific classification
- Kingdom: Animalia
- Phylum: Arthropoda
- Class: Insecta
- Order: Lepidoptera
- Family: Drepanidae
- Genus: Didymana
- Species: D. bidens

Binomial name
- Didymana bidens (Leech, 1890)

Synonyms
- Drepana bidens Leech, 1890; Didymana renei Bryk, 1943

Species of hook-tip moth

Didymana bidens is a moth in the family Drepanidae. It was described by John Henry Leech in 1890. It is found in the Chinese provinces of Hubei, Sichuan, Yunnan, Shaanxi and Fujian and in north-eastern Myanmar.

The wingspan is about 30 mm. The forewings are purplish black, the outer margin bordered with tawny, interrupted by a line and cloud of the ground colour and preceded by a broad whitish band. The hindwings are similar to the forewings, but paler and without the submarginal band.
