= Agnidra alextoba =

Scientific classification
- Kingdom: Animalia
- Phylum: Arthropoda
- Class: Insecta
- Order: Lepidoptera
- Family: Drepanidae
- Genus: Agnidra
- Species: A. alextoba

Binomial name
- Agnidra alextoba Buchsbaum, 2000

Species of hook-tip moth

Agnidra alextoba is a moth in the family Drepanidae. It was described by Ulf Buchsbaum in 2000. It is found on Sumatra.

The wingspan is 32–39 mm for males and 36–42 mm for females. The ground colour is yellowish brown.
