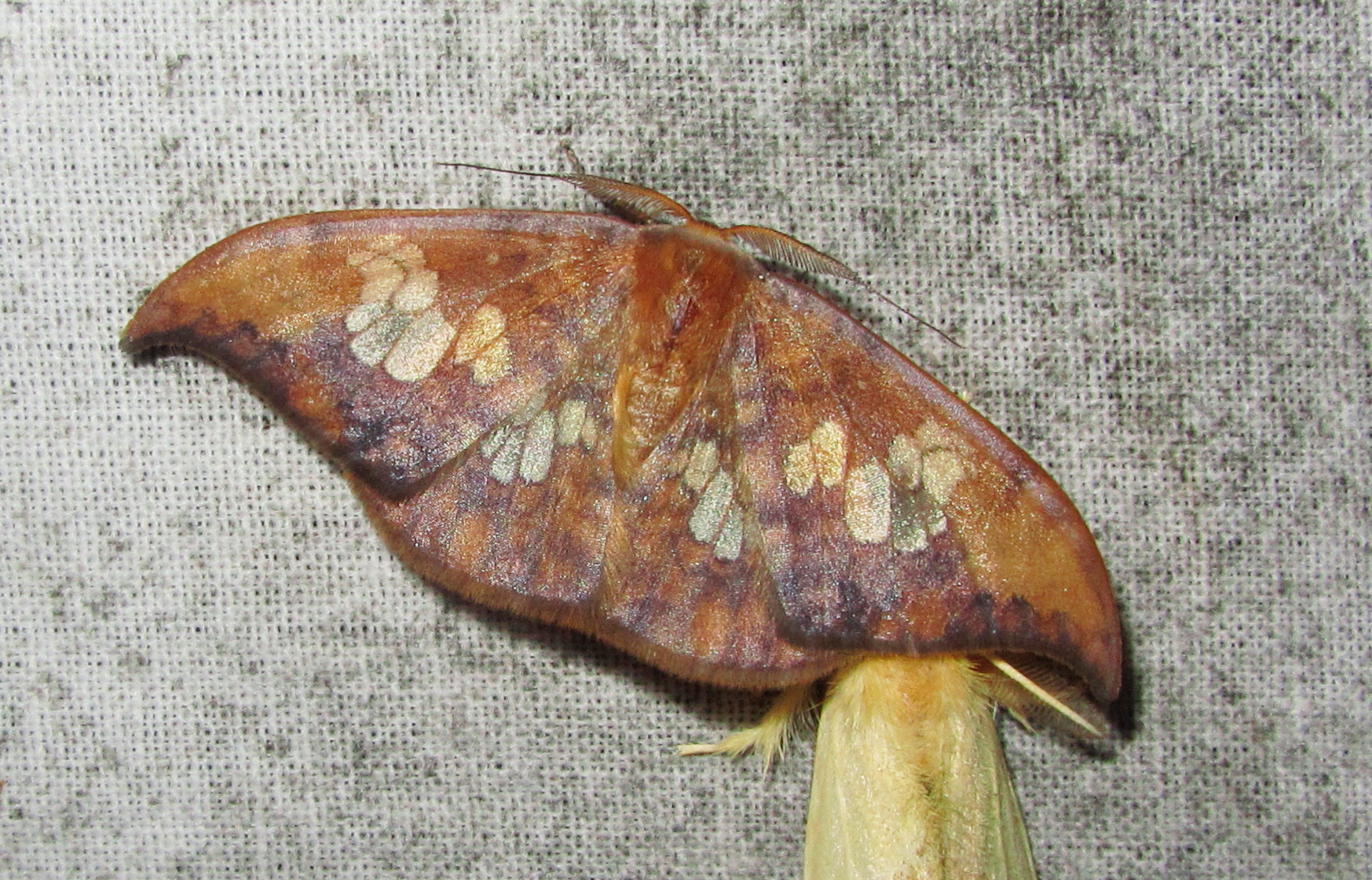

Scientific classification
- Kingdom: Animalia
- Phylum: Arthropoda
- Class: Insecta
- Order: Lepidoptera
- Family: Drepanidae
- Genus: Agnidra
- Species: A. specularia

Binomial name
- Agnidra specularia (Walker, 1860)

Synonyms
- Fascellina specularia Walker, 1860; Drepana specularia; Albara specularia; Albara ochracina Bryk, 1943

= Agnidra specularia =

Species of hook-tip moth

Agnidra specularia is a moth in the family Drepanidae. It was described by Francis Walker in 1860. It is found in Sri Lanka, north-eastern India (Darjeeling, Assam, Sikkim), Bhutan, Vietnam and Xizang, China.

The wingspan is 19-22.5 mm for males and 24-25.5 mm for females.

== Subspecies ==
- Agnidra specularia specularia
- Agnidra specularia xizanga H.F. Chu & L.Y. Wang, 1988 (China: Xizang)
