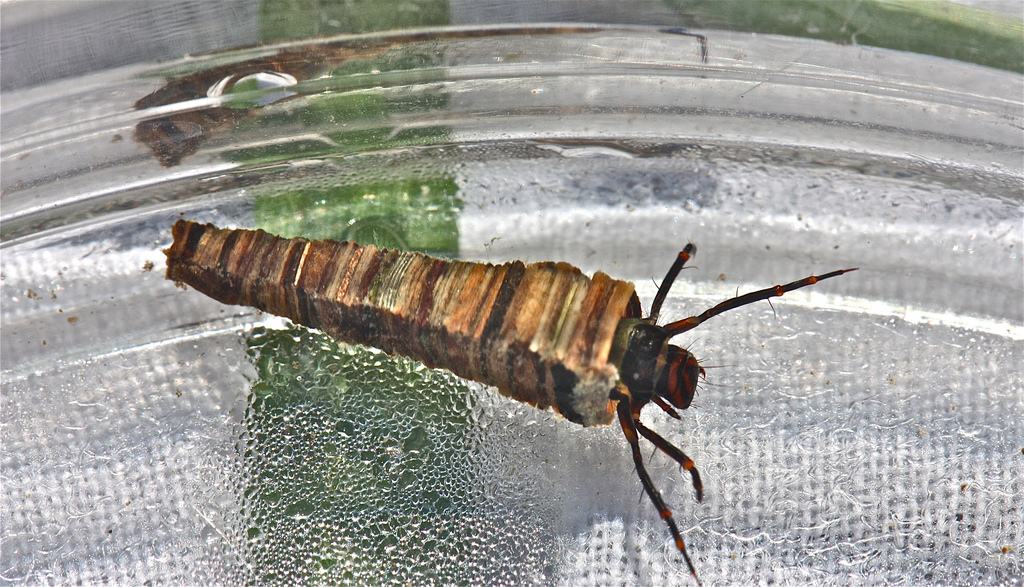

Scientific classification
- Kingdom: Animalia
- Phylum: Arthropoda
- Clade: Pancrustacea
- Class: Insecta
- Order: Trichoptera
- Family: Brachycentridae
- Genus: Brachycentrus; Curtis, 1834

Subgenera
- Brachycentrus (Brachycentrus) Curtis, 1834; Brachycentrus (Oligoplectrodes) Martynov, 1909; Brachycentrus (Oligoplectrum) McLachlan, 1868; Brachycentrus (Sphinctogaster) Provancher, 1877; Brachycentrus (Sychnothrix) Flint, 1984

Synonyms
- Dasystoma Rambur, 1842; Hydronautia Kolenati, 1848; Oligoplectrum McLachlan, 1868; Pogonostoma Rambur, 1842; Sphinctogaster Provancher, 1877

= Brachycentrus =

Genus of caddisflies

Brachycentrus is a genus of humpless casemaker caddisflies in the family Brachycentridae. There are at least 30 described species in Brachycentrus.

== Species ==
These 30 species belong to the genus Brachycentrus:

- Brachycentrus adoxus McLachlan, 1880
- Brachycentrus americanus (Banks, 1899)
- Brachycentrus appalachia Flint, 1984
- Brachycentrus bilobatus Martynov, 1935
- Brachycentrus carpathicus Dziedzielewicz, 1895
- Brachycentrus chelatus Ross, 1947
- Brachycentrus cinerea Walker, 1852
- Brachycentrus echo (Ross, 1947)
- Brachycentrus etowahensis Wallace, 1971
- Brachycentrus fuliginosus Walker, 1852
- Brachycentrus incanus Hagen, 1861
- Brachycentrus japonica (Iwata, 1927)
- Brachycentrus kozlovi Martynov, 1909
- Brachycentrus kuwayamai Wiggins, Tani & Tanida, 1985
- Brachycentrus lateralis (Say, 1823)
- Brachycentrus maculatum (Fourcroy, 1785)
- Brachycentrus montanus Klapalek, 1892
- Brachycentrus nigrosoma (Banks, 1905)
- Brachycentrus numerosus (Say, 1823)
- Brachycentrus occidentalis Banks, 1911
- Brachycentrus punctatus Forsslund, 1935
- Brachycentrus schnitnikovi Martynov, 1924
- Brachycentrus signata (Fabricius, 1781)
- Brachycentrus solomoni Flint, 1984
- Brachycentrus spinae Ross, 1948
- Brachycentrus subnubilis Curtis, 1834
- Brachycentrus subnubilus Curtis, 1834
- Brachycentrus tazingolensis Mey, 1980
- Brachycentrus ugamicus Grigorenko & Ivanov, 1990
- † Hydronautia labialis (Hagen, 1856)
