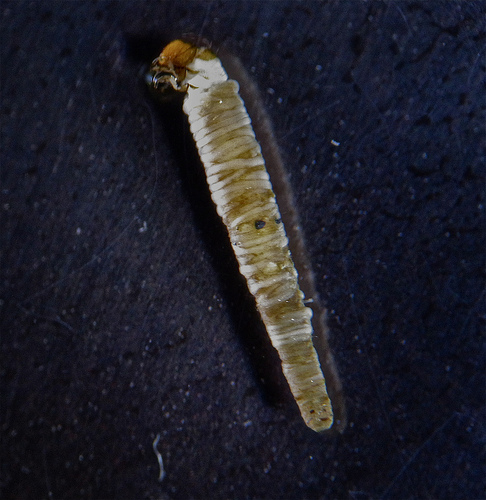

Scientific classification
- Kingdom: Animalia
- Phylum: Arthropoda
- Clade: Pancrustacea
- Class: Insecta
- Order: Trichoptera
- Family: Brachycentridae
- Genus: Micrasema; McLachlan, 1876

= Micrasema =

Genus of caddisflies

Micrasema is a genus of humpless casemaker caddisflies in the family Brachycentridae. There are more than 70 described species in Micrasema.

== Species ==
These 73 species belong to the genus Micrasema:

- Micrasema abbreviatum Pongracz, 1923
- Micrasema abhavyam Schmid, 1992
- Micrasema adhacharam Schmid, 1992
- Micrasema adhiram Schmid, 1992
- Micrasema aigisthos Malicky, 1997
- Micrasema alexanderi Denning, 1948
- Micrasema anatolicum Botosaneanu, 1974
- Micrasema apratitam Schmid, 1992
- Micrasema arizonicum Ling, 1938
- Micrasema asajjanam Schmid, 1992
- Micrasema asuro Malicky & Chantaramongkol, 1992
- Micrasema avadhiritam Schmid, 1992
- Micrasema bactro Ross, 1938
- Micrasema baitinum Mosely, 1938
- Micrasema bennetti Ross, 1947
- Micrasema bifoliatum Martynov, 1925
- Micrasema borneense Banks, 1931
- Micrasema bricco Malicky & Chantaramongkol, 1992
- Micrasema burksi Ross & Unzicker, 1965
- Micrasema canusa Botosaneanu, 1990
- Micrasema cenerentola Schmid, 1952
- Micrasema charonis Banks, 1914
- Micrasema consimile Mey, 1997
- Micrasema dabhram Schmid, 1992
- Micrasema difficile Mosely, 1934
- Micrasema dimicki (Milne, 1936)
- Micrasema diteris Ross, 1947
- Micrasema etra Denning, 1948
- Micrasema extremum Botosaneanu, 1990
- Micrasema fortiso Malicky & Chantaramongkol, 1992
- Micrasema gabusi Schmid, 1952
- Micrasema gelidum McLachlan, 1876
- Micrasema genjiroense Kobayashi, 1971
- Micrasema gentile McLachlan, 1880
- Micrasema hakonense Kobayashi, 1969
- Micrasema hanasense Tsuda, 1942
- Micrasema helveio Malicky & Chantaramongkol, 1992
- Micrasema jihmam Schmid, 1992
- Micrasema karunam Schmid, 1992
- Micrasema kripanam Schmid, 1992
- Micrasema kurilicum Botosaneanu, 1990
- Micrasema longulum McLachlan, 1876
- Micrasema mencilis Sipahiler, 1995
- Micrasema microcephalum (Pictet, 1834)
- Micrasema minimum McLachlan, 1876
- Micrasema moestum (Hagen, 1868)
- Micrasema morosum (McLachlan, 1868)
- Micrasema naevum (Hagen, 1868)
- Micrasema nepalicum Botosaneanu, 1976
- Micrasema nigrum (Brauer, 1857)
- Micrasema onisca Ross, 1947
- Micrasema oregonum Denning, 1983
- Micrasema ozarkanum Ross & Unzicker, 1965
- Micrasema philomele Malicky, 2000
- Micrasema primoricum Botosaneanu, 1990
- Micrasema prokne Malicky, 2000
- Micrasema punjaubi Mosely, 1938
- Micrasema quadrilobum Martynov, 1933
- Micrasema rickeri Ross & Unzicker, 1965
- Micrasema rusticum (Hagen, 1868)
- Micrasema salardum Schmid, 1952
- Micrasema scissum McLachlan, 1884
- Micrasema scotti Ross, 1947
- Micrasema sericeum Klapálek, 1902
- Micrasema servatum (Navas, 1918)
- Micrasema setiferum (Pictet, 1834)
- Micrasema sprulesi Ross, 1941
- Micrasema tereus Malicky, 2000
- Micrasema togatum (Hagen, 1864)
- Micrasema turbo Malicky & Chantaramongkol, 1992
- Micrasema uenoi Martynov, 1933
- Micrasema vestitum Navas, 1918
- Micrasema wataga Ross, 1938
