= Robert B. and Vitae A. Kite Apartment Building =

- U.S. National Register of Historic Places
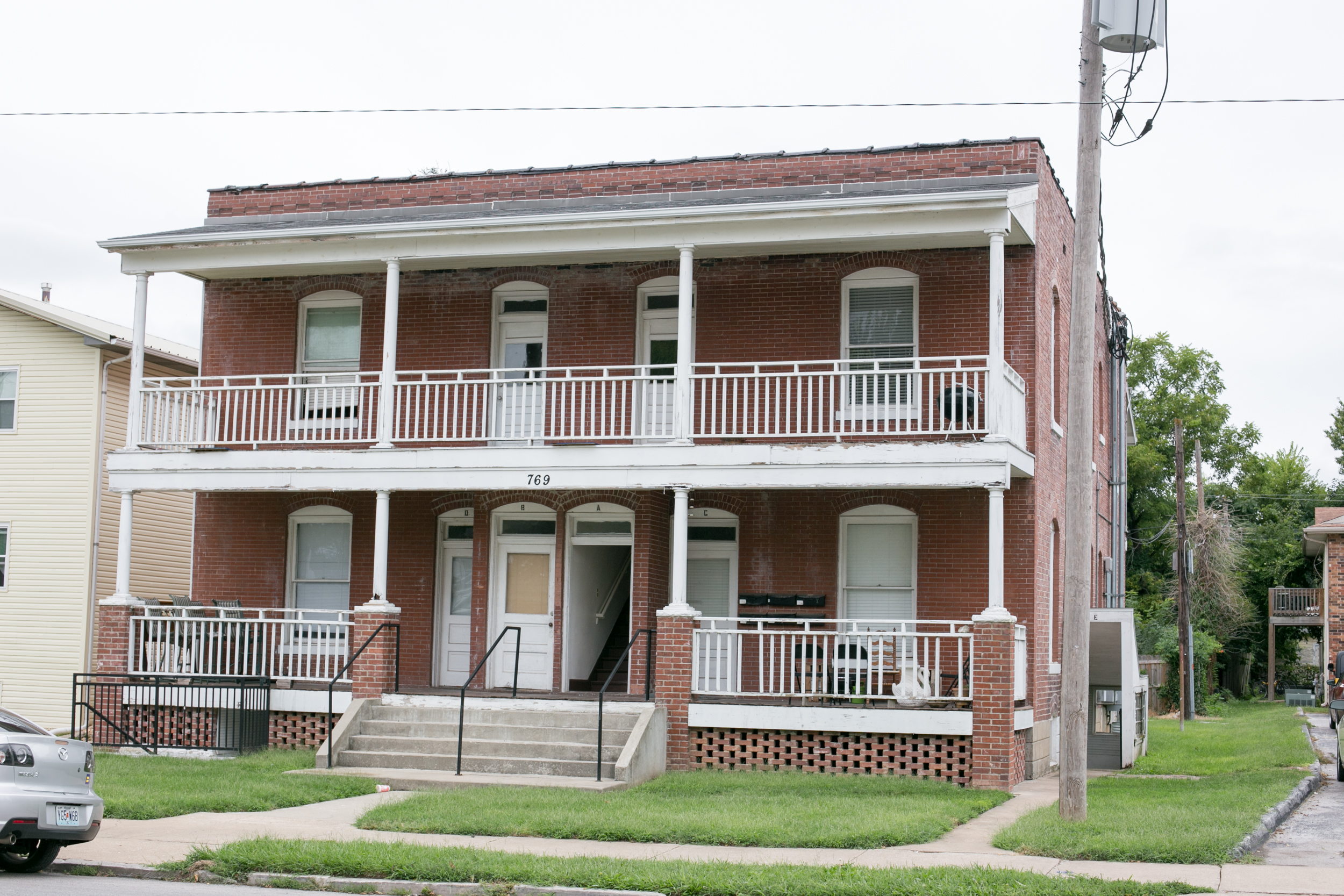
- 769–771 South Ave., September 2014

- Location within Missouri Location within the United States
- Location: Robert B. and Vitae A. Kite Apartment Building, Springfield, Missouri
- Coordinates: 37°12′9″N 93°17′34″W
- Area: less than one acre
- Built: c. 1906
- Architectural style: Porched Square Apartment
- NRHP reference No.: 03001504
- Added to NRHP: January 28, 2004

Robert B. and Vitae A. Kite Apartment Building is a historic apartment building located at Springfield, Greene County, Missouri. It was built about 1906, and is a small-scale two-story brick apartment building, with a symmetrical square plan. It houses four apartment units on the first and second floors in a two-over-two configuration. It features a two-story stacked wood porch characteristic of the Porched Square Apartment.

It was listed on the National Register of Historic Places in 2004.
