= Agnidra fulvior =

Scientific classification
- Domain: Eukaryota
- Kingdom: Animalia
- Phylum: Arthropoda
- Class: Insecta
- Order: Lepidoptera
- Family: Drepanidae
- Genus: Agnidra
- Species: A. fulvior

Binomial name
- Agnidra fulvior Watson, 1968

Species of hook-tip moth

Agnidra fulvior is a moth in the family Drepanidae. It was described by Watson in 1968. It is found in China (Yunnan).
