= Agnidra corticata =

Scientific classification
- Domain: Eukaryota
- Kingdom: Animalia
- Phylum: Arthropoda
- Class: Insecta
- Order: Lepidoptera
- Family: Drepanidae
- Genus: Agnidra
- Species: A. corticata

Binomial name
- Agnidra corticata (Warren, 1922)

Synonyms
- Drepana corticata Warren, 1922

Species of hook-tip moth

Agnidra corticata is a moth in the family Drepanidae. It was described by Warren in 1922. It is found in north-eastern India and China (Sichuan).

== Subspecies ==
- Agnidra corticata corticata (north-eastern India)
- Agnidra corticata francki Watson, 1968 (China: Sichuan)
