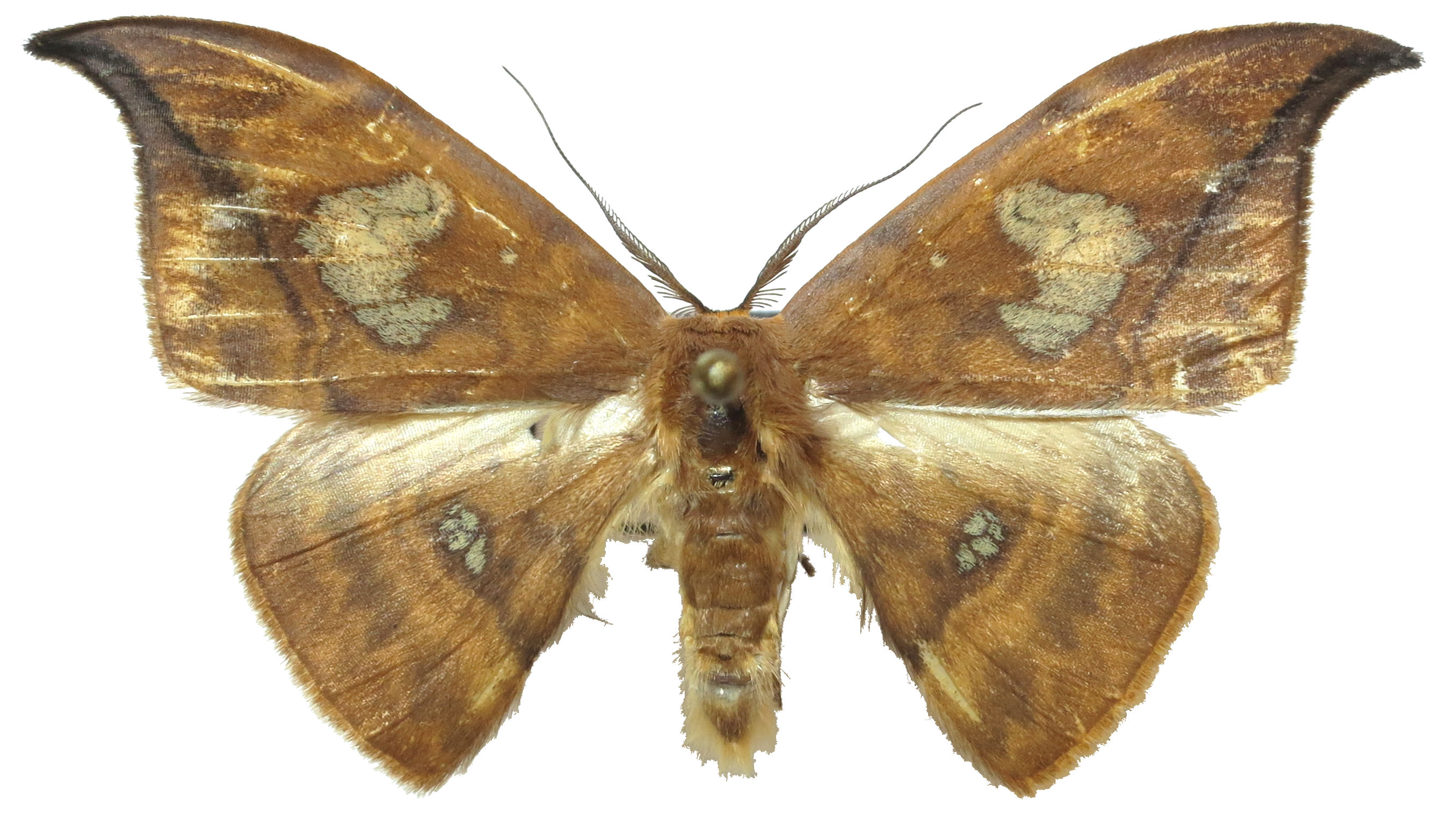
- Agnidra fuscilinea - Brinchang, Malaysia

Scientific classification
- Kingdom: Animalia
- Phylum: Arthropoda
- Class: Insecta
- Order: Lepidoptera
- Family: Drepanidae
- Genus: Agnidra
- Species: A. fuscilinea

Binomial name
- Agnidra fuscilinea (Watson, 1961)

Synonyms
- Albara fuscilinea Watson, 1961

= Agnidra fuscilinea =

Species of hook-tip moth

Agnidra fuscilinea is a moth in the family Drepanidae. It was described by Watson in 1961.

== Distribution ==
It is found on Peninsular Malaysia, Sumatra and Borneo.
