= Hong-Fu Chu =

Chinese entomologist

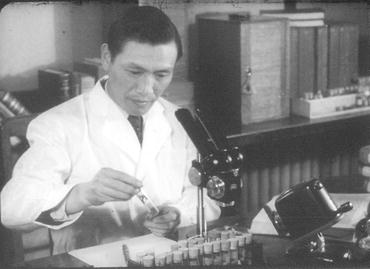
Hong-Fu Chu in 1950

Hong-Fu Chu (or Hong-Fu Zhu) (Chinese: 朱弘复; 13 January 1910 – 24 January 2002) was a Chinese entomologist known for his pioneering work in establishing entomology in China. He was a specialist on insect immatures and was among the pioneers in the use of chaetotaxy in the classification of lepidopteran larvae.

Chu was born in 1910 in Nantong, Jiangsu province where he went to school. He received a BS degree from Tsinghua University in 1935 and took an interest in zoology and entomology. He went to the University of Illinois in 1941 to study entomology under W.P. Hayes and V.E. Shelford. He received a MS in 1942 and a PhD in 1945. Chu's book How to the Know the Immature Insect (1949) was a well-known entomology text for many years in the United States of America. After working for a year in the Illinois Natural History Survey on the taxonomy of sawflies with H.H. Ross, and a year at the Wesleyan University, he returned to China. In 1950 he was invited by the Chinese Academy of Science to establish an institute of entomology in Beijing. He invited other entomologists like Chongle Liu, Banghua Cai, Jinren Lu, Junde Qin, and Shijun Ma to work at the institute. He began to organize the publishing of Fauna Sinica and a series on the economic insects of China. He helped train students in phylogenetic systematics and wrote a textbook on animal systematics.
