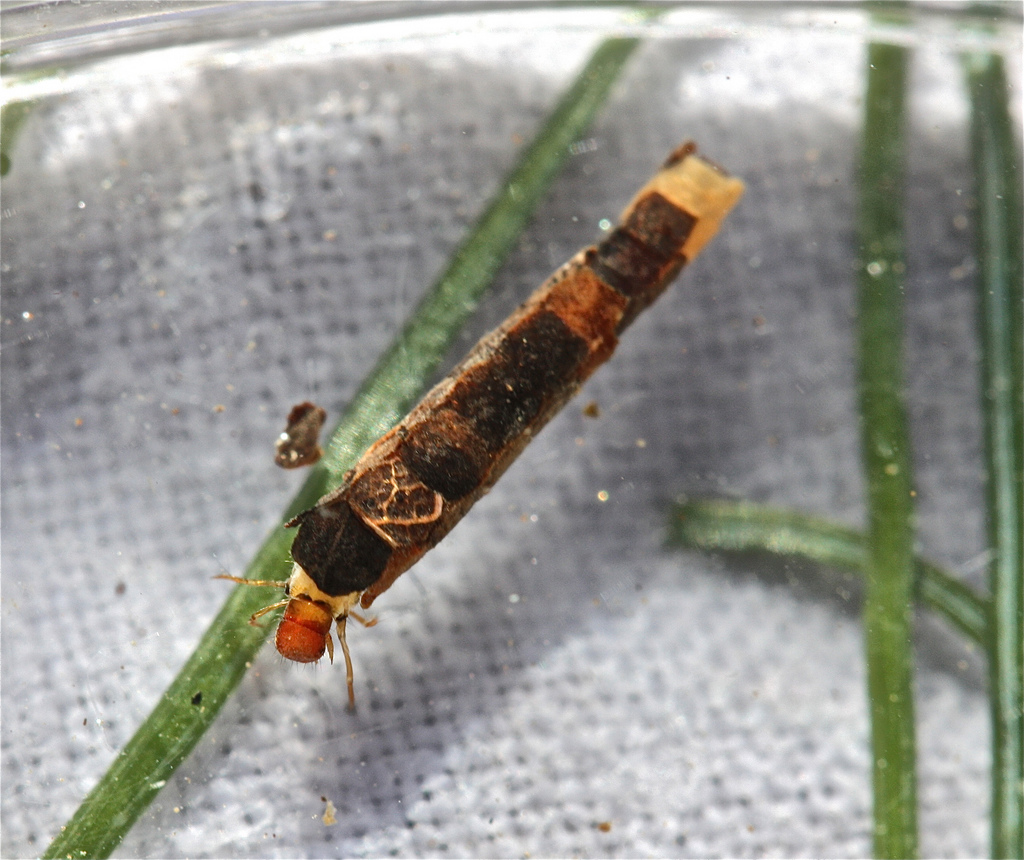

Scientific classification
- Kingdom: Animalia
- Phylum: Arthropoda
- Clade: Pancrustacea
- Class: Insecta
- Order: Trichoptera
- Family: Lepidostomatidae
- Genus: Lepidostoma; Rambur, 1842

Subgenera
- Lepidostoma (Lepidostoma) Rambur, 1842; Lepidostoma (Mormomyia) Banks, 1907; Lepidostoma (Neodinarthrum) Weaver, 1988; Lepidostoma (Nosopus) McLachlan, 1871

Diversity
- at least 150 species

Synonyms
- Alepomyia Banks, 1908; Alepomyiodes Sibley, 1926; Arcadopsyche Banks, 1930; Atomyia Banks, 1905; Jenortha Milne, 1936; Mormomyia Banks, 1907; Neuropsyche Carpenter, 1933; Nosopus McLachlan, 1871; Notiopsyche Banks, 1905; Olemira Banks, 1897; Oligopsyche Carpenter, 1933; Phanopsyche Banks, 1911; Pristosilo Banks, 1899

= Lepidostoma =

Genus of caddisflies

Lepidostoma is a genus of bizarre caddisflies in the family Lepidostomatidae. There are more than 150 described species in Lepidostoma.

== See also ==
- List of Lepidostoma species
