= Herbert Holdsworth Ross =

British-Canadian systematic entomologist

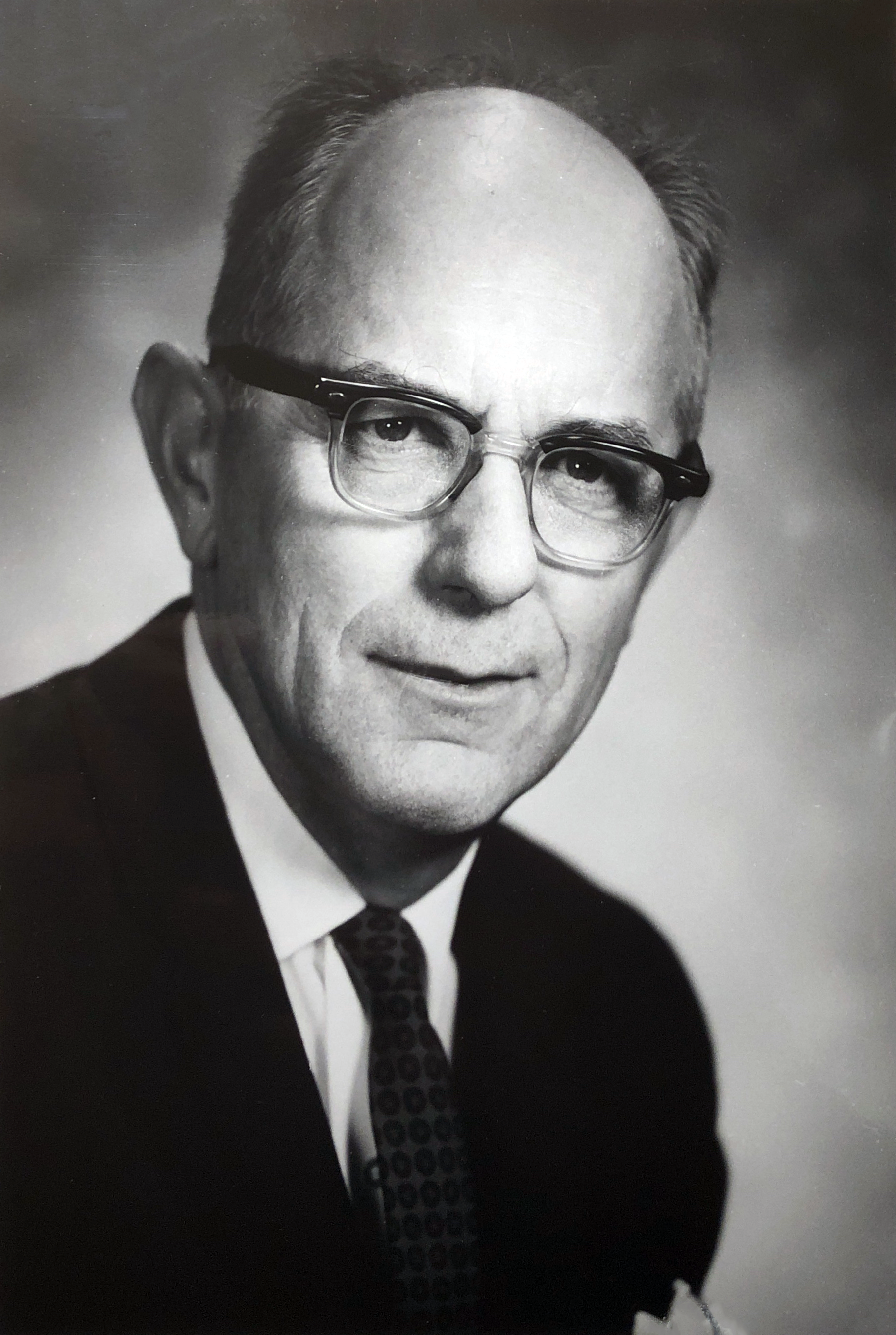
Herbert Ross in 1967

Herbert Holdsworth Ross (3 March 1908 – 2 November 1978) was a British-Canadian systematic entomologist. He was the author of an influential textbook of entomology first published in 1949. He worked on many insect groups but was widely recognized for his work on the Trichoptera.

Ross was born to Jonathan and Jessie Holdsworth in Leeds. The family moved to Vancouver where Ross was educated. He graduated from the University of British Columbia in 1927 and then studied at the University of Illinois, Urbana-Champaign. receiving an MS in 1929 and a PhD in 1933. He worked as a systematic entomologist with the Illinois Natural History Survey and served as a professor of entomology at the University from 1947 to 1969.

He married Jean Alexander in 1933 and she collaborated in many of his researches.
