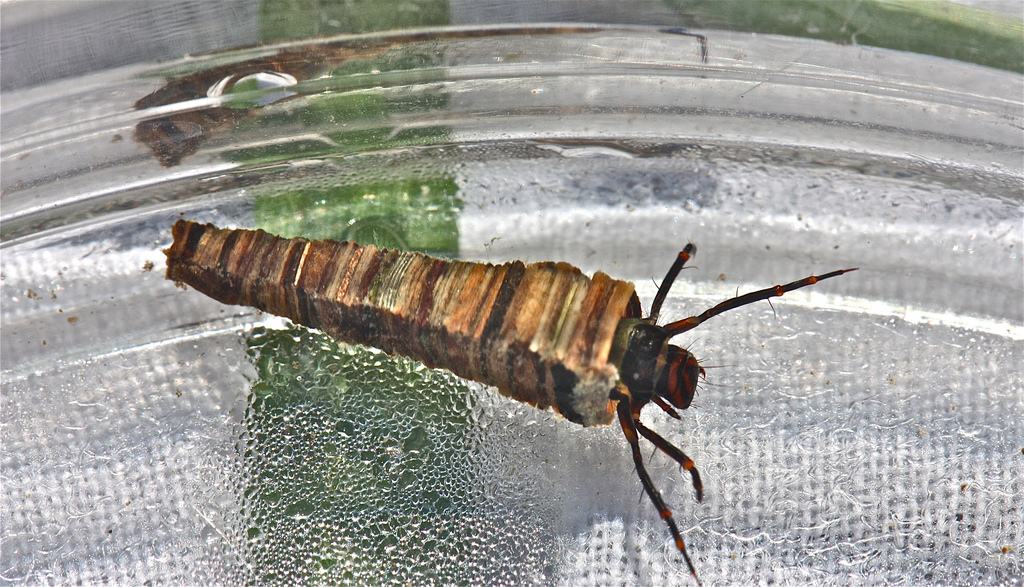
- Brachycentrus sp. larva in case

Scientific classification
- Kingdom: Animalia
- Phylum: Arthropoda
- Clade: Pancrustacea
- Class: Insecta
- Order: Trichoptera
- Superfamily: Phryganeoidea
- Family: Brachycentridae; Ulmer, 1903

= Brachycentridae =

Family of caddisflies

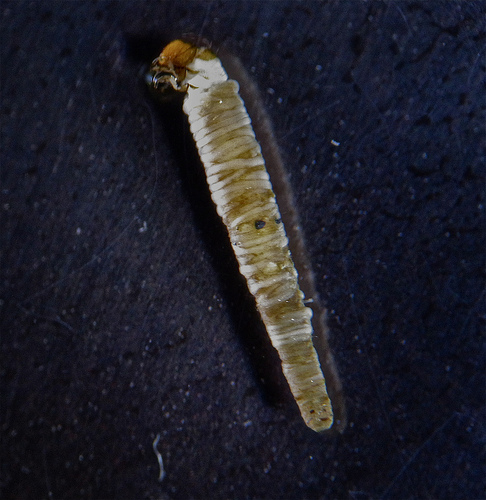
Micrasema

Brachycentridae is a family of humpless casemaker caddisflies in the order Trichoptera. It is found in North America, Europe, and Asia. Georg Ulmer first described it in Germany in 1903 as a subfamily of Sericostomatidae. The type genus for Brachycentridae is Brachycentrus J. Curtis, 1834.

== Distribution ==
The family Brachycentridae contains at least 100 species in about 8 genera. The genera Adicrophelps and Amiocentrus are found near the Arctic Circle. Species of the genera Doliocentrus and Eorbachycentrus are found in southeastern Siberia and Japan and western North America respectively.

== Larvae ==
Most species' larvae make cases using plant or rock material. Several others make it out of silk. A few species' larvae in Brachycentrus form cases in the water with hairs sticking out to absorb food from the water.

== Genera ==
These eight genera belong to the family Brachycentridae:

- Adicrophleps Flint, 1965^{i c g b}
- Amiocentrus Ross, 1938^{i c g b}
- Baissoplectrum Ivanov, 2006^{g}
- Brachycentrus Curtis, 1834^{i c g b}
- Dolichocentrus Martynov, 1935^{i c g}
- Eobrachycentrus Wiggins, 1965^{i c g}
- Hummeliella Forsslund, 1936^{i c g}
- Micrasema McLachlan, 1876^{i c g b}

Data sources: i = ITIS, c = Catalogue of Life, g = GBIF, b = Bugguide.net
