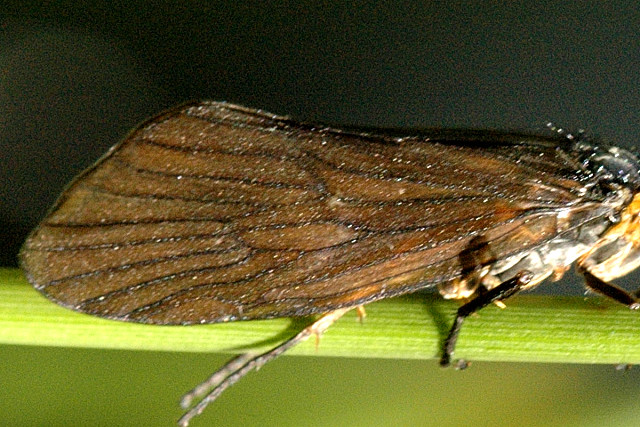
- Wing detail

Scientific classification
- Kingdom: Animalia
- Phylum: Arthropoda
- Clade: Pancrustacea
- Class: Insecta
- Order: Trichoptera
- Suborder: Integripalpia
- Superfamily: Limnephiloidea
- Family: Lepidostomatidae; Ulmer, 1903

Subfamilies
- Lepidostomatinae; Theliopsychinae

= Lepidostomatidae =

Family of insects

Lepidostomatidae is a family in the order Trichoptera. It is widely dispersed around the world. Larvae shapes vary. Larvae are normally found near bodies of water. It was first discovered by Georg Ulmer in 1903.

== Distribution ==
It is normally found in the Northern Hemisphere. Some species' range extends south to Panama and New Guinea.

== Larvae ==
Larvae cases are mostly square shaped or circular. Larvae cases are normally found near rivers or stream beds, although some are found near lake beds.
