= List of Rhyacophila species =

This is a list of 647 species in the genus Rhyacophila, green sedges.

== Rhyacophila species ==
- Rhyacophila abchasica Martynov, 1934
- Rhyacophila aberrans Martynov, 1913
- Rhyacophila accola Flint, 1972
- Rhyacophila acraliodonta Sun in Yang, Sun & Tian, 1995
- Rhyacophila acutiloba Morse & Ross, 1971
- Rhyacophila adjuncta McLachlan, 1884
- Rhyacophila ainola Malicky, 1989
- Rhyacophila aithra Malicky, 1997
- Rhyacophila alabama Harris, 1991
- Rhyacophila albardana McLachlan, 1879
- Rhyacophila alberta Banks, 1918
- Rhyacophila alexanderi Denning, 1950
- Rhyacophila alpina Vaillant, 1968
- Rhyacophila alticola Kimmins, 1953
- Rhyacophila altoincisiva Hwang, 1957
- Rhyacophila amabilis Denning, 1965
- Rhyacophila amasarica Mey, 1994
- Rhyacophila amblyodonta Sun & Yang, 1999
- Rhyacophila amicis Ross, 1956
- Rhyacophila anakbatukau Malicky, 1995
- Rhyacophila anakbuah Malicky, 1995
- Rhyacophila anakdjeram Malicky, 1995
- Rhyacophila anaksungai Malicky, 1995
- Rhyacophila anaktiongkok Malicky, 1995
- Rhyacophila anatina Morton, 1900
- Rhyacophila ancestralis Martynov, 1935
- Rhyacophila angden Schmid, 1970
- Rhyacophila angelieri Decamps, 1965
- Rhyacophila angelita Banks, 1911
- Rhyacophila angulata Martynov, 1910
- Rhyacophila annulicornis Kimmins, 1953
- Rhyacophila antiope Malicky, 1997
- Rhyacophila aphrodite Malicky, 1975
- Rhyacophila apicalis Kimmins, 1953
- Rhyacophila appalachia Morse & Ross, 1971
- Rhyacophila appennina McLachlan, 1898
- Rhyacophila aquitanica McLachlan, 1879
- Rhyacophila arcangelina Navás, 1932
- Rhyacophila arcella Denning, 1975
- Rhyacophila ardala Denning, 1965
- Rhyacophila arefini Lukyanchenko, 1993
- Rhyacophila argentipunctella Kimmins, 1955
- Rhyacophila arhaviensis Sipahiler, 1986
- Rhyacophila armeniaca Guerin-Meneville, 1843
- Rhyacophila arnaudi Denning, 1948
- Rhyacophila articulata Morton, 1900
- Rhyacophila arties Sipahiler, 2000
- Rhyacophila asahiensis Kobayashi, 1976
- Rhyacophila assimilis Kimmins, 1953
- Rhyacophila atomaria Navás, 1936
- Rhyacophila atrata Banks, 1911
- Rhyacophila aurata Brauer, 1857
- Rhyacophila aureomaculata Schmid, 1970
- Rhyacophila aureostigma Schmid, 1970
- Rhyacophila autumnalis Nimmo, 1977
- Rhyacophila avicularis Kimmins, 1953
- Rhyacophila azumaensis Kobayashi, 1973
- Rhyacophila bacurianica Lepneva, 1961
- Rhyacophila baibarana Matsumura, 1931
- Rhyacophila bakurianica Lepneva, 1961
- Rhyacophila balangshana Malicky, 1995
- Rhyacophila balcanica Radovanovic, 1953
- Rhyacophila balosa Denning, 1989
- Rhyacophila banksi Ross, 1944
- Rhyacophila banra Olah, 1987
- Rhyacophila basalis Banks, 1911
- Rhyacophila belona Ross, 1948
- Rhyacophila betteni Ling, 1938
- Rhyacophila bhotia Schmid, 1970
- Rhyacophila bhuchanadhara Schmid, 1970
- Rhyacophila bicolor Kimmins, 1953
- Rhyacophila bicostata Sun & Yang, 1995
- Rhyacophila bidens Kimmins, 1953
- Rhyacophila biegelmeieri Malicky, 1984
- Rhyacophila bifida Kimmins, 1953
- Rhyacophila bifila Banks, 1914
- Rhyacophila bilobata Ulmer, 1907
- Rhyacophila bivitta Sun, 1997
- Rhyacophila blarina Ross, 1941
- Rhyacophila blenda Malicky & Chantaramongkol, 1993
- Rhyacophila bonaparti Schmid, 1947
- Rhyacophila borcka Sipahiler, 1996
- Rhyacophila bosnica Schmid, 1970
- Rhyacophila braaschi Malicky & Kumanski in Kumanski & Malicky, 1976
- Rhyacophila brechlini Mey, 1998
- Rhyacophila brevicephala Iwata, 1927
- Rhyacophila brevifurcata Kumanski, 1985
- Rhyacophila brunnea Banks, 1911
- Rhyacophila burmana Kimmins, 1953
- Rhyacophila cameroni Banks, 1931
- Rhyacophila carolae Harris, 1989
- Rhyacophila carolina Banks, 1911
- Rhyacophila carpenteri Milne, 1936
- Rhyacophila castanea Hagen, 1858
- Rhyacophila cataractae Mey, 1998
- Rhyacophila caussica Vaillant, 1967
- Rhyacophila cedrensis Schmid in Schmid, Arefina & Levanidova, 1993
- Rhyacophila celata Sun & Yang, 1999
- Rhyacophila cerita Denning, 1971
- Rhyacophila chakungpa Schmid, 1970
- Rhyacophila chamolungpa Schmid, 1970
- Rhyacophila chandleri Denning, 1956
- Rhyacophila chandragoupta Schmid, 1959
- Rhyacophila chandzo Schmid, 1970
- Rhyacophila changpa Schmid, 1970
- Rhyacophila chayulpa Schmid, 1970
- Rhyacophila chematangpa Schmid, 1970
- Rhyacophila chembo Schmid, 1970
- Rhyacophila chenmo Schmid, 1970
- Rhyacophila chilsia Denning, 1950
- Rhyacophila chimdro Schmid, 1970
- Rhyacophila chirka Schmid in Schmid, Arefina & Levanidova, 1993
- Rhyacophila chomoyuma Schmid, 1970
- Rhyacophila choprai Martynov, 1935
- Rhyacophila chordata Denning, 1989
- Rhyacophila chugalungpa Schmid, 1970
- Rhyacophila chulukpa Schmid, 1970
- Rhyacophila chumikpa Schmid, 1970
- Rhyacophila chungse Schmid, 1970
- Rhyacophila churongpa Schmid, 1970
- Rhyacophila cibinensis Botosaneanu & Marinkovic-Gospodnetic, 1967
- Rhyacophila clavalis Martynov, 1913
- Rhyacophila claviforma Sun & Yang, 1998
- Rhyacophila clemens Tsuda, 1940
- Rhyacophila coclearis Hsu & Chen, 1996
- Rhyacophila colonus Schmid, 1970
- Rhyacophila coloradensis Banks, 1904
- Rhyacophila complanata Tian & Li, 1986
- Rhyacophila confinium Botosaneanu, 1957
- Rhyacophila confissa Botosaneanu, 1970
- Rhyacophila contorta Sun & Yang, 1995
- Rhyacophila coreana Tsuda, 1940
- Rhyacophila cornuta Kimmins, 1953
- Rhyacophila crassa Schmid, 1970
- Rhyacophila crispa Sun & Yang, 1998
- Rhyacophila cruciata Forsslund, 1935
- Rhyacophila cuneata Sun & Yang, 1999
- Rhyacophila cupressorum Martynov, 1913
- Rhyacophila curtior Schmid, 1970
- Rhyacophila curvata Morton, 1900
- Rhyacophila dactyloidis Sun & Yang, 1995
- Rhyacophila dafla Schmid, 1970
- Rhyacophila dakshi Schmid, 1970
- Rhyacophila darbyi Fields, 1981
- Rhyacophila davao Ross, 1950
- Rhyacophila delphinensis Vaillant, 1968
- Rhyacophila denticulifera Kumanski, 1985
- Rhyacophila depressa Martynov, 1910
- Rhyacophila dgaldanpa Schmid, 1970
- Rhyacophila diakoftensis Malicky in Cakin & Malicky, 1983
- Rhyacophila diffidens Tsuda, 1940
- Rhyacophila dikkaravasini Schmid, 1970
- Rhyacophila dilatata Martynov, 1935
- Rhyacophila dirangpa Schmid, 1970
- Rhyacophila discoidalis Kimmins, 1953
- Rhyacophila divaricata Kimmins, 1953
- Rhyacophila doehleri Botosaneanu, 1957
- Rhyacophila dolingpa Schmid, 1970
- Rhyacophila dolokana Malicky, 1978
- Rhyacophila donaldi Nimmo, 1977
- Rhyacophila dongkyapa Schmid, 1970
- Rhyacophila dongre Schmid, 1970
- Rhyacophila donoana Malicky, 1978
- Rhyacophila dorje Schmid, 1970
- Rhyacophila dorsalis (Curtis, 1834)
- Rhyacophila drokpa Schmid, 1970
- Rhyacophila drosampa Schmid, 1970
- Rhyacophila drotangpa Schmid, 1970
- Rhyacophila dumogana Neboiss & Botosaneanu, 1988
- Rhyacophila eatoni McLachlan, 1879
- Rhyacophila ebria Denning, 1949
- Rhyacophila ecosa Ross, 1941
- Rhyacophila egijnica Schmid, 1968
- Rhyacophila elongata Kimmins, 1953
- Rhyacophila esorima Mey, 1996
- Rhyacophila euryphylla Sun & Yang, 1999
- Rhyacophila evoluta McLachlan, 1879
- Rhyacophila excavata Martynov, 1909
- Rhyacophila exilis Sun & Yang, 1999
- Rhyacophila extensa Martynov, 1928
- Rhyacophila fagarashiensis Botosaneanu, 1964
- Rhyacophila falcifera Schmid, 1970
- Rhyacophila falita Ross, 1956
- Rhyacophila fansipana Mey, 1998
- Rhyacophila fasciata Hagen, 1859
- Rhyacophila fenderi Ross, 1948
- Rhyacophila fenestra Ross, 1938
- Rhyacophila fischeri Botosaneanu, 1957
- Rhyacophila flava Klapalek, 1898
- Rhyacophila flaviventris Kimmins, 1953
- Rhyacophila fletcheri (Kimmins, 1952)
- Rhyacophila flinti Schmid, 1970
- Rhyacophila foliacea Moretti, 1981
- Rhyacophila fonticola Giudicelli & Dakki, 1984
- Rhyacophila forcipulata Martynov, 1926
- Rhyacophila formosa Banks, 1911
- Rhyacophila formosae Iwata, 1928
- Rhyacophila formosana Ulmer, 1927
- Rhyacophila fragariae Malicky, 1976
- Rhyacophila furca Hwang & Tian, 1982
- Rhyacophila furcifera Klapalek, 1904
- Rhyacophila fuscula (Walker, 1852)
- Rhyacophila gelukpa Schmid, 1970
- Rhyacophila gemona Ross, 1938
- Rhyacophila germana Navas, 1923
- Rhyacophila glaberrima Ulmer, 1907
- Rhyacophila glaciera Denning, 1965
- Rhyacophila glareosa McLachlan, 1867
- Rhyacophila gorgitensis Sipahiler, 1997
- Rhyacophila grahami Banks, 1940
- Rhyacophila grandis Banks, 1911
- Rhyacophila gudrunae Malicky, 1972
- Rhyacophila gyaldzen Schmid, 1970
- Rhyacophila gyamo Schmid, 1970
- Rhyacophila gyaspa Schmid, 1970
- Rhyacophila gyelbu Schmid, 1970
- Rhyacophila haddocki Denning, 1968
- Rhyacophila hamifera Kimmins, 1953
- Rhyacophila hamosa Sun in Yang, Sun & Tian, 1995
- Rhyacophila hangnia Olah, 1987
- Rhyacophila haplostephana Sun & Yang, 1998
- Rhyacophila harmstoni Ross, 1944
- Rhyacophila hayachiensis Kobayashi, 1976
- Rhyacophila hayakawai Kobayashi, 1969
- Rhyacophila hingstoni Martynov, 1930
- Rhyacophila hippocrepica Sun & Yang, 1995
- Rhyacophila hirticornis McLachlan, 1879
- Rhyacophila hoabinha Olah, 1987
- Rhyacophila hoangliensis Mey, 1998
- Rhyacophila hobsoni Martynov, 1930
- Rhyacophila hokkaidensis Iwata, 1927
- Rhyacophila hyalinata Banks, 1905
- Rhyacophila hydaspica Schmid, 1959
- Rhyacophila imitabilis Arefina in Schmid, Arefina, & Levanidova, 1993
- Rhyacophila immaculata Mey, 1996
- Rhyacophila impar Martynov, 1914
- Rhyacophila implicata Arefina in Schmid, Arefina, & Levanidova, 1993
- Rhyacophila inaequalis Denning & Schmid, 1971
- Rhyacophila inconspicua Morton, 1900
- Rhyacophila incudis Mey, 1996
- Rhyacophila inculta Ross & Spencer, 1952
- Rhyacophila insularis Schmid, 1970
- Rhyacophila intermedia McLachlan, 1868
- Rhyacophila invaria (Walker, 1852)
- Rhyacophila iranda Ross, 1938
- Rhyacophila ishihanaensis Kobayashi, 1984
- Rhyacophila isolata Banks, 1934
- Rhyacophila isparta Sipahiler, 1996
- Rhyacophila italica Moretti, 1981
- Rhyacophila itoi Tsuda & Kawai, 1967
- Rhyacophila janosi Olah, 1987
- Rhyacophila javana Ulmer, 1951
- Rhyacophila jayadurga Schmid, 1970
- Rhyacophila jenniferae Peck in Peck & Smith, 1978
- Rhyacophila jewetti Denning, 1954
- Rhyacophila jigme Schmid, 1970
- Rhyacophila jirisana Kobayashi, 1989
- Rhyacophila joani Sipahiler, 2000
- Rhyacophila joosti Mey, 1979
- Rhyacophila kadampa Schmid, 1970
- Rhyacophila kadaphes Schmid, 1959
- Rhyacophila kadphises Schmid, 1959
- Rhyacophila kagyupa Schmid, 1970
- Rhyacophila kaltatica Levanidova & Schmid, 1977
- Rhyacophila kando Schmid, 1970
- Rhyacophila kangjongpa Schmid, 1970
- Rhyacophila kanichka Schmid, 1959
- Rhyacophila kardakoffi Navás, 1926
- Rhyacophila karila Denning, 1948
- Rhyacophila karpa Schmid, 1970
- Rhyacophila kashongpa Schmid, 1970
- Rhyacophila kawachenpa Schmid, 1970
- Rhyacophila kawamurae Tsuda, 1940
- Rhyacophila kawaraboensis Kobayashi, 1976
- Rhyacophila kedara Schmid, 1970
- Rhyacophila kelnerae Schmid, 1971
- Rhyacophila kernada Ross, 1950
- Rhyacophila khamakhya Schmid, 1970
- Rhyacophila khasiorum Schmid, 1970
- Rhyacophila khimbarpa Schmid, 1970
- Rhyacophila khiympa Schmid, 1970
- Rhyacophila kiamichi Ross, 1944
- Rhyacophila kimminsi Ross, 1956
- Rhyacophila kimminsiana Botosaneanu, 1958
- Rhyacophila kincaidi Schmid, 1970
- Rhyacophila kisoensis Tsuda, 1940
- Rhyacophila kiyosumiensis Kuranishi, 1990
- Rhyacophila kiyrongpa Schmid, 1970
- Rhyacophila kohnoae Ross, 1956
- Rhyacophila kolymensis Arefina in Schmid, Arefina, & Levanidova, 1993
- Rhyacophila kondratieffi Parker, 1986
- Rhyacophila kownackiana Szczesny, 1970
- Rhyacophila krauskasseggae Malicky, 1978
- Rhyacophila kubra Schmid, 1970
- Rhyacophila kumanskii Spuris, 1988
- Rhyacophila kumgangsanica Kumanski, 1990
- Rhyacophila kunma Schmid, 1970
- Rhyacophila kuramana Tsuda, 1942
- Rhyacophila kusang Schmid, 1970
- Rhyacophila kuwayamai Schmid, 1970
- Rhyacophila kyadongpa Schmid, 1970
- Rhyacophila kyimdongpa Schmid, 1970
- Rhyacophila kyungpa Schmid, 1970
- Rhyacophila labeculata Kimmins, 1953
- Rhyacophila laevis Pictet, 1834
- Rhyacophila lambakanta Schmid, 1970
- Rhyacophila langdarma Schmid, 1970
- Rhyacophila laptsapa Schmid, 1970
- Rhyacophila lata Martynov, 1918
- Rhyacophila latitergum Davis, 1950
- Rhyacophila laufferi Navas, 1918
- Rhyacophila ledra Ross, 1939
- Rhyacophila lenae Martynov, 1910
- Rhyacophila lepcha Schmid, 1970
- Rhyacophila lepnevae Levanidova, 1977
- Rhyacophila lezeyi Navas, 1933
- Rhyacophila lhabu Schmid, 1970
- Rhyacophila lhadzongpa Schmid, 1970
- Rhyacophila lhakpa Schmid, 1970
- Rhyacophila lhopa Schmid, 1970
- Rhyacophila lieftincki Ulmer, 1951
- Rhyacophila ligifera Kimmins, 1953
- Rhyacophila liliputana Banks, 1939
- Rhyacophila lineata Denning, 1956
- Rhyacophila lobifera Betten, 1934
- Rhyacophila lobsang Schmid, 1970
- Rhyacophila longicuspis Sun in Yang, Sun & Tian, 1995
- Rhyacophila longistyla Sun & Yang, 1995
- Rhyacophila lonpo Schmid, 1970
- Rhyacophila loxias Schmid, 1970
- Rhyacophila lurella Denning, 1975
- Rhyacophila lusitanica McLachlan, 1884
- Rhyacophila macrorrhiza Sun & Yang, 1995
- Rhyacophila madalensis Hsu & Chen, 1996
- Rhyacophila magnahamata Hsu & Chen, 1996
- Rhyacophila mahunkai Olah, 1987
- Rhyacophila mainensis Banks, 1911
- Rhyacophila maitripa Schmid, 1970
- Rhyacophila makiensis Kobayashi, 1987
- Rhyacophila malayana Banks, 1931
- Rhyacophila malkini Ross, 1947
- Rhyacophila manicata Kimmins, 1953
- Rhyacophila manipuri Schmid, 1970
- Rhyacophila manistee Ross, 1938
- Rhyacophila manlungpa Schmid, 1970
- Rhyacophila manna Malicky & Chantaramongkol, 1993
- Rhyacophila manuleata Martynov, 1934
- Rhyacophila marcida Banks, 1947
- Rhyacophila maritima Levanidova, 1977
- Rhyacophila marpa Schmid, 1970
- Rhyacophila martynovi Mosely, 1930
- Rhyacophila mayaensis Kobayashi, 1973
- Rhyacophila mayestril Malicky, 1992
- Rhyacophila melli Ulmer, 1926
- Rhyacophila melpomene Malicky, 1976
- Rhyacophila merangirana Malicky, 1978
- Rhyacophila meridionalis Pictet, 1865
- Rhyacophila meyeri McLachlan, 1879
- Rhyacophila milarepa Schmid, 1970
- Rhyacophila milnei Ross, 1950
- Rhyacophila mimiclaviforma Sun & Yang, 1998
- Rhyacophila minor Banks, 1924
- Rhyacophila minoyamaensis Kobayashi, 1973
- Rhyacophila minuta Banks, 1939
- Rhyacophila mirabilis Levanidova & Schmid, 1977
- Rhyacophila mishmica Kimmins, 1953
- Rhyacophila mjohjangsanica Botosaneanu, 1970
- Rhyacophila mocsaryi Klapalek, 1898
- Rhyacophila mongolica Levanidova in Schmid, Arefina & Levanidova, 1993
- Rhyacophila monstrosa Levanidova & Schmid, 1977
- Rhyacophila montana Carpenter, 1933
- Rhyacophila monyulpa Schmid, 1970
- Rhyacophila morettina Botosaneanu, 1980
- Rhyacophila mortoni Kimmins, 1953
- Rhyacophila mosana Denning, 1965
- Rhyacophila motakanta Schmid, 1970
- Rhyacophila motasi Botosaneanu, 1957
- Rhyacophila mroczkowskii Botosaneanu, 1970
- Rhyacophila muktepa Schmid, 1970
- Rhyacophila multispinomera Sun & Yang, 1998
- Rhyacophila munda McLachlan, 1862
- Rhyacophila murhu Malicky & Chantaramongkol, 1989
- Rhyacophila mycta Ross, 1941
- Rhyacophila nabochepa Schmid, 1970
- Rhyacophila naga Schmid, 1970
- Rhyacophila nagaokaensis Kobayashi, 1976
- Rhyacophila nagongpa Schmid, 1970
- Rhyacophila nakagawai Kobayashi, 1969
- Rhyacophila nakpo Schmid, 1970
- Rhyacophila namgyal Schmid, 1970
- Rhyacophila nana Levanidova in Schmid, Arefina & Levanidova, 1993
- Rhyacophila nanpingensis Sun & Yang, 1998
- Rhyacophila narayani Schmid, 1970
- Rhyacophila narvae Navás, 1926
- Rhyacophila naviculata Morton, 1900
- Rhyacophila negrosana Mey, 1998
- Rhyacophila neograndis Denning, 1948
- Rhyacophila nephroida Sun & Yang, 1998
- Rhyacophila netongpa Schmid, 1970
- Rhyacophila nevada Schmid, 1952
- Rhyacophila nevadensis Banks, 1924
- Rhyacophila newelli Denning, 1968
- Rhyacophila ngawang Schmid, 1970
- Rhyacophila ngorpa Schmid, 1970
- Rhyacophila ngulpa Schmid, 1970
- Rhyacophila nigra Martynov, 1930
- Rhyacophila nigrita Banks, 1907
- Rhyacophila nigrocephala Iwata, 1927
- Rhyacophila nigrorosea Schmid, 1959
- Rhyacophila niizakiensis Kobayashi, 1976
- Rhyacophila nipponica Navas, 1933
- Rhyacophila niwae Iwata, 1927
- Rhyacophila noeibia Malicky & Chantaramongkol, 1993
- Rhyacophila norbu Schmid, 1970
- Rhyacophila norcuta Ross, 1938
- Rhyacophila nubila Zetterstedt, 1840
- Rhyacophila nyamangpa Schmid, 1970
- Rhyacophila nyelungpa Schmid, 1970
- Rhyacophila nyerongpa Schmid, 1970
- Rhyacophila nyerpa Schmid, 1970
- Rhyacophila nyukmadongpa Schmid, 1970
- Rhyacophila obelix Malicky, 1979
- Rhyacophila obliterata McLachlan, 1863
- Rhyacophila obscura Martynov, 1927
- Rhyacophila obtusa Klapalek, 1894
- Rhyacophila occidentalis McLachlan, 1879
- Rhyacophila okuihana Mey, 1996
- Rhyacophila ophrys Ross, 1948
- Rhyacophila oreia Ross, 1947
- Rhyacophila oreta Ross, 1941
- Rhyacophila orghidani Botosaneanu, 1952
- Rhyacophila orientalis Kimmins, 1953
- Rhyacophila orobica Moretti, 1991
- Rhyacophila orthacantha Emoto, 1979
- Rhyacophila osellai Malicky, 1981
- Rhyacophila otica Etnier & Way, 1973
- Rhyacophila pacata Tsuda, 1940
- Rhyacophila pacifica Banks, 1895
- Rhyacophila pallida Mosely, 1930
- Rhyacophila palmeni McLachlan, 1879
- Rhyacophila parantra Ross, 1948
- Rhyacophila paratecta Mey, 1996
- Rhyacophila parilis Mey, 1998
- Rhyacophila parva Kimmins, 1953
- Rhyacophila pascoei McLachlan, 1879
- Rhyacophila paurava Schmid, 1959
- Rhyacophila pellisa Ross, 1938
- Rhyacophila pemba Schmid, 1970
- Rhyacophila pendayica Malicky, 1975
- Rhyacophila pepingensis Ulmer, 1932
- Rhyacophila perda Ross, 1938
- Rhyacophila perdita Banks, 1938
- Rhyacophila peripenis Sun & Yang, 1998
- Rhyacophila perplana Ross & Spencer, 1952
- Rhyacophila petersorum Schmid & Denning, 1971
- Rhyacophila philopotamoides McLachlan, 1879
- Rhyacophila pichaca Denning, 1956
- Rhyacophila pieli Navas, 1933
- Rhyacophila pirinica Kumanski, 1980
- Rhyacophila poba Schmid, 1970
- Rhyacophila polha Schmid, 1970
- Rhyacophila polonica McLachlan, 1879
- Rhyacophila pongensis Sipahiler, 2000
- Rhyacophila porntipae Malicky, 1987
- Rhyacophila potteri Denning & Schmid, 1971
- Rhyacophila praemorsa McLachlan, 1879
- Rhyacophila procliva Kimmins, 1953
- Rhyacophila producta McLachlan, 1879
- Rhyacophila pseudotristis Kumanski, 1987
- Rhyacophila pubescens Pictet, 1834
- Rhyacophila pulchra Schmid, 1952
- Rhyacophila putata Kimmins, 1953
- Rhyacophila quadrifida Sun & Yang, 1995
- Rhyacophila quana Malicky & Chantaramongkol, 1989
- Rhyacophila ramingwongi Malicky, 1987
- Rhyacophila ranga Olah, 1987
- Rhyacophila ravizzai Moretti, 1991
- Rhyacophila rayneri Ross, 1951
- Rhyacophila rectispina McLachlan, 1884
- Rhyacophila relegata Schmid, 1970
- Rhyacophila relicta McLachlan, 1879
- Rhyacophila retracta Martynov, 1914
- Rhyacophila reyesi Denning, 1989
- Rhyacophila rhombica Martynov, 1935
- Rhyacophila rickeri Ross, 1956
- Rhyacophila riedeliana Botosaneanu, 1970
- Rhyacophila rima Sun & Yang, 1995
- Rhyacophila robusta Schmid, 1970
- Rhyacophila rongpa Schmid, 1970
- Rhyacophila rotunda Banks, 1924
- Rhyacophila rougemonti McLachlan, 1880
- Rhyacophila ructicna Malicky, 1993
- Rhyacophila rupta McLachlan, 1879
- Rhyacophila sakyapa Schmid, 1970
- Rhyacophila sanglungpa Schmid, 1970
- Rhyacophila satoi Kuranishi, 1997
- Rhyacophila sauwana Malicky, 1995
- Rhyacophila schismatica Sun & Yang, 1995
- Rhyacophila schmidi Ross, 1969-70
- Rhyacophila schmidinarica Urbanic, Krusnik, & Malicky, 2000
- Rhyacophila scissa Morton, 1900
- Rhyacophila scissoides Kimmins, 1953
- Rhyacophila scotina Kimmins, 1953
- Rhyacophila senggepa Schmid, 1970
- Rhyacophila sequoia Denning, 1950
- Rhyacophila shakangpa Schmid, 1970
- Rhyacophila shekigawana Kobayashi, 1973
- Rhyacophila shenandoahensis Flint, 1958
- Rhyacophila sherchokpa Schmid, 1970
- Rhyacophila sherpa Schmid, 1970
- Rhyacophila shikotsuensis Iwata, 1927
- Rhyacophila shingripa Schmid, 1970
- Rhyacophila shiraishiensis Kobayashi, 1971
- Rhyacophila sibirica McLachlan, 1879
- Rhyacophila sicorensis Navas, 1917
- Rhyacophila sierra Denning, 1968
- Rhyacophila sikungpa Schmid, 1970
- Rhyacophila silinka Arefina, 1994
- Rhyacophila similis Martynov, 1935
- Rhyacophila simplex Nimmo, 1977
- Rhyacophila simulatrix McLachlan, 1879
- Rhyacophila sinensis Martynov, 1931
- Rhyacophila singularis Botosaneanu, 1970
- Rhyacophila sinuata Kimmins, 1953
- Rhyacophila soldani Mey, 1989
- Rhyacophila soror Provancher, 1878
- Rhyacophila spinalis Martynov, 1930
- Rhyacophila spinata Denning, 1965
- Rhyacophila spinosellata Mey, 1995
- Rhyacophila spinulata Martynov, 1913
- Rhyacophila stankovici Radovanovic, 1932
- Rhyacophila starki Smith & Weaver III, 1984
- Rhyacophila stenostyla Martynov, 1930
- Rhyacophila stigmatica (Kolenati, 1859)
- Rhyacophila styligera Kimmins, 1953
- Rhyacophila subovata Martynov, 1913
- Rhyacophila sumatrana Ulmer, 1930
- Rhyacophila sumdopa Schmid, 1970
- Rhyacophila sutchanica Schmid & Levanidova, 1986
- Rhyacophila suthepensis Malicky, 1987
- Rhyacophila szeptyckii Malicky, 1993
- Rhyacophila tachikawana Kobayashi, 1973
- Rhyacophila tamalpaisi Denning, 1975
- Rhyacophila tamdaoensis Malicky, 1995
- Rhyacophila tamdaona Olah, 1987
- Rhyacophila tantichodoki Malicky & Chantaramongkol, 1993
- Rhyacophila tarda Giudicelli, 1968
- Rhyacophila tarkiya Schmid, 1970
- Rhyacophila tashepa Schmid, 1970
- Rhyacophila tashidingpa Schmid, 1970
- Rhyacophila tecta Morton, 1900
- Rhyacophila teddyi Ross, 1939
- Rhyacophila tehama Denning, 1975
- Rhyacophila tenebrosa Mey, 1998
- Rhyacophila tengyelingpa Schmid, 1970
- Rhyacophila ternifolia Sun & Yang, 1995
- Rhyacophila terpsichore Malicky, 1976
- Rhyacophila tetracantha Sun & Yang, 1995
- Rhyacophila tetraphylla Sun & Yang, 1995
- Rhyacophila thyridata Navás, 1935
- Rhyacophila tolungpa Schmid, 1970
- Rhyacophila tonneri Mey, 1989
- Rhyacophila torva Hagen, 1861
- Rhyacophila tosagan Malicky & Chantaramongkol, 1993
- Rhyacophila tralala Schmid, 1970
- Rhyacophila transquilla Tsuda, 1940
- Rhyacophila trashipa Schmid, 1970
- Rhyacophila trescaviscensis Botosaneanu, 1960
- Rhyacophila triangularis Schmid, 1970
- Rhyacophila tricornuta Sykora & McCabe, 1996
- Rhyacophila tridentata Tian & Li, 1986
- Rhyacophila trifasciata Mosely, 1930
- Rhyacophila triloba Hwang, 1958
- Rhyacophila trinacriformis Tian & Li, 1986
- Rhyacophila tristis Pictet, 1834
- Rhyacophila trulungpa Schmid, 1970
- Rhyacophila truncata Kimmins, 1953
- Rhyacophila tsering Schmid, 1970
- Rhyacophila tshiringpa Schmid, 1970
- Rhyacophila tshogpa Schmid, 1970
- Rhyacophila tsiudmarpo Schmid, 1970
- Rhyacophila tsona Schmid, 1970
- Rhyacophila tsongkhapa Schmid, 1970
- Rhyacophila tsudai Ross, 1956
- Rhyacophila tsurakiana Malicky, 1984
- Rhyacophila tsusimaensis Kobayashi, 1985
- Rhyacophila tucula Ross, 1950
- Rhyacophila tungkorpa Schmid, 1970
- Rhyacophila tungpa Schmid, 1970
- Rhyacophila tupikana Mey, 1994
- Rhyacophila uchidai Kobayashi, 1989
- Rhyacophila ugyenpa Schmid, 1970
- Rhyacophila ulmeri Navas, 1907
- Rhyacophila uncata Kimmins, 1953
- Rhyacophila ungulata Kimmins, 1953
- Rhyacophila unimaculata Denning, 1941
- Rhyacophila unipunctata Schmid, 1970
- Rhyacophila urgl Malicky & Lounaci, 1987
- Rhyacophila vaccua Milne, 1936
- Rhyacophila vaefes Milne, 1936
- Rhyacophila vagrita Milne, 1936
- Rhyacophila vallei Moretti, 1997
- Rhyacophila valuma Milne, 1936
- Rhyacophila vandeli Despax, 1933
- Rhyacophila vao Milne, 1936
- Rhyacophila vedra Milne, 1936
- Rhyacophila velora Denning, 1954
- Rhyacophila vemna Milne, 1936
- Rhyacophila verecunda Tsuda, 1940
- Rhyacophila vernestril Mey, 1996
- Rhyacophila verrula Milne, 1936
- Rhyacophila verugia Malicky & Chantaramongkol, 1993
- Rhyacophila vetina Milne, 1936
- Rhyacophila vibox Milne, 1936
- Rhyacophila vicina Botosaneanu, 1970
- Rhyacophila viduata Navas, 1918
- Rhyacophila viquaea Milne, 1936
- Rhyacophila visor Milne, 1936
- Rhyacophila vobara Milne, 1936
- Rhyacophila vocala Milne, 1936
- Rhyacophila voccia Malicky & Chantaramongkol, 1993
- Rhyacophila vofixa Milne, 1936
- Rhyacophila vranitzensis Botosaneanu & Marinkovic-Gospodnetic, 1967
- Rhyacophila vulgaris Pictet, 1834
- Rhyacophila vuzana Milne, 1936
- Rhyacophila wangpo Schmid, 1970
- Rhyacophila wanichacheewai Malicky, 1987
- Rhyacophila willametta Ross, 1950
- Rhyacophila wolongensis Malicky, 1995
- Rhyacophila wuyanensis Sun & Yang, 1998
- Rhyacophila wuyiensis Sun & Yang, 1995
- Rhyacophila xayide Malicky & Chantaramongkol, 1989
- Rhyacophila yamanakensis Iwata, 1927
- Rhyacophila yamazakii Tsuda, 1941
- Rhyacophila yarlungpa Schmid, 1970
- Rhyacophila yigrongpa Schmid, 1970
- Rhyacophila yipung Schmid, 1970
- Rhyacophila yishepa Schmid, 1970
- Rhyacophila yonggyapa Schmid, 1970
- Rhyacophila yora Malicky, 1989
- Rhyacophila yoshinensis Tsuda & Kawai, 1967
- Rhyacophila yosiiana Tsuda, 1940
- Rhyacophila yukii Tsuda, 1942
- Rhyacophila yullha Schmid, 1970
- Rhyacophila zhiltsovae Ivanov, 1991
- Rhyacophila zhungpa Schmid, 1970
- Rhyacophila zwickorum Malicky, 1972
