= Rhyacophila amabilis =

Conservation status
- Extinct (IUCN 2.3)

Scientific classification
- Kingdom: Animalia
- Phylum: Arthropoda
- Class: Insecta
- Order: Trichoptera
- Family: Rhyacophilidae
- Genus: Rhyacophila
- Species: †R. amabilis

Binomial name
- †Rhyacophila amabilis Denning, 1965

Extinct species of caddisfly

Rhyacophila amabilis, the Castle Lake caddisfly, is an extinct species of insect in the caddisfly family Rhyacophilidae. It was endemic to the United States. It was first reported as extinct in 1986.
