= Rhyacophila acutiloba =

Scientific classification
- Kingdom: Animalia
- Phylum: Arthropoda
- Class: Insecta
- Order: Trichoptera
- Family: Rhyacophilidae
- Genus: Rhyacophila
- Species: R. acutiloba

Binomial name
- Rhyacophila acutiloba Morse & Ross, 1971

Species of caddisfly

Rhyacophila acutiloba is a species of free-living caddisfly in the family Rhyacophilidae. It is found in North America.
