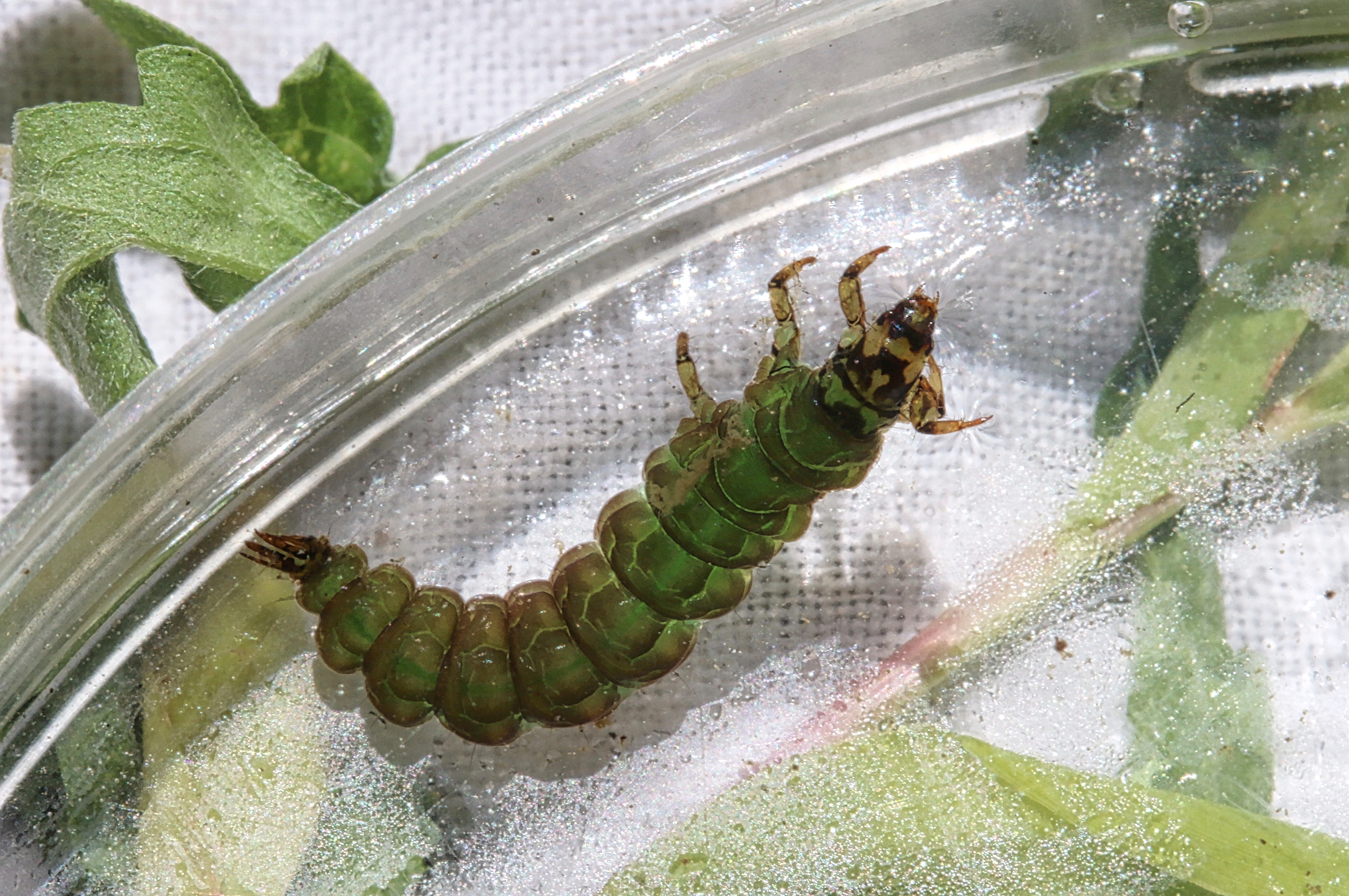
- Caddisfly larva, Rhyacophila fuscula

Scientific classification
- Kingdom: Animalia
- Phylum: Arthropoda
- Clade: Pancrustacea
- Class: Insecta
- Order: Trichoptera
- Family: Rhyacophilidae
- Genus: Rhyacophila
- Species: R. fuscula

Binomial name
- Rhyacophila fuscula (Walker, 1852)

= Rhyacophila fuscula =

Species of caddisfly

Rhyacophila fuscula is a species of free-living caddisfly in the family Rhyacophilidae. It is found in North America.
