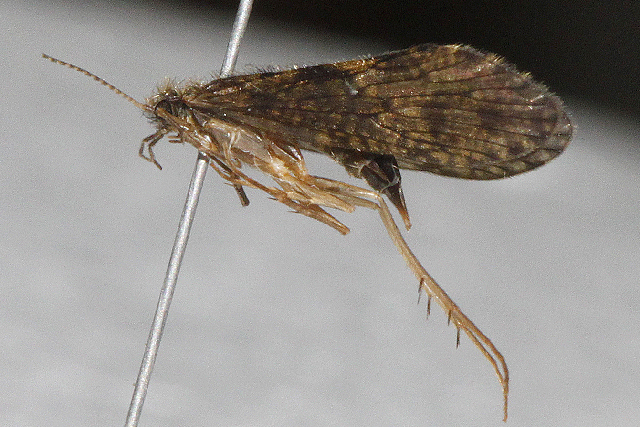

Scientific classification
- Kingdom: Animalia
- Phylum: Arthropoda
- Clade: Pancrustacea
- Class: Insecta
- Order: Trichoptera
- Family: Rhyacophilidae
- Genus: Rhyacophila
- Species: R. angelita

Binomial name
- Rhyacophila angelita Banks, 1911

= Rhyacophila angelita =

Species of caddisfly

Rhyacophila angelita is a species of free-living caddisfly in the family Rhyacophilidae. It is found in North America.
