= Himalopsyche phryganea =

Scientific classification
- Domain: Eukaryota
- Kingdom: Animalia
- Phylum: Arthropoda
- Class: Insecta
- Order: Trichoptera
- Family: Rhyacophilidae
- Genus: Himalopsyche
- Species: H. phryganea

Binomial name
- Himalopsyche phryganea (Ross, 1941)

Synonyms
- Rhyacophila phryganea Ross, 1941

Species of caddisfly

Himalopsyche phryganea is a species of free-living caddisfly in the family Rhyacophilidae. It is found in North America.
