= Rhyacophila formosa =

Scientific classification
- Kingdom: Animalia
- Phylum: Arthropoda
- Clade: Pancrustacea
- Class: Insecta
- Order: Trichoptera
- Family: Rhyacophilidae
- Genus: Rhyacophila
- Species: R. formosa

Binomial name
- Rhyacophila formosa Banks, 1911

Synonyms
- Rhyacophila vuphipes Milne, 1936

Species of caddisfly

Rhyacophila formosa is a species of free-living caddisfly in the family Rhyacophilidae. It is found in North America.
