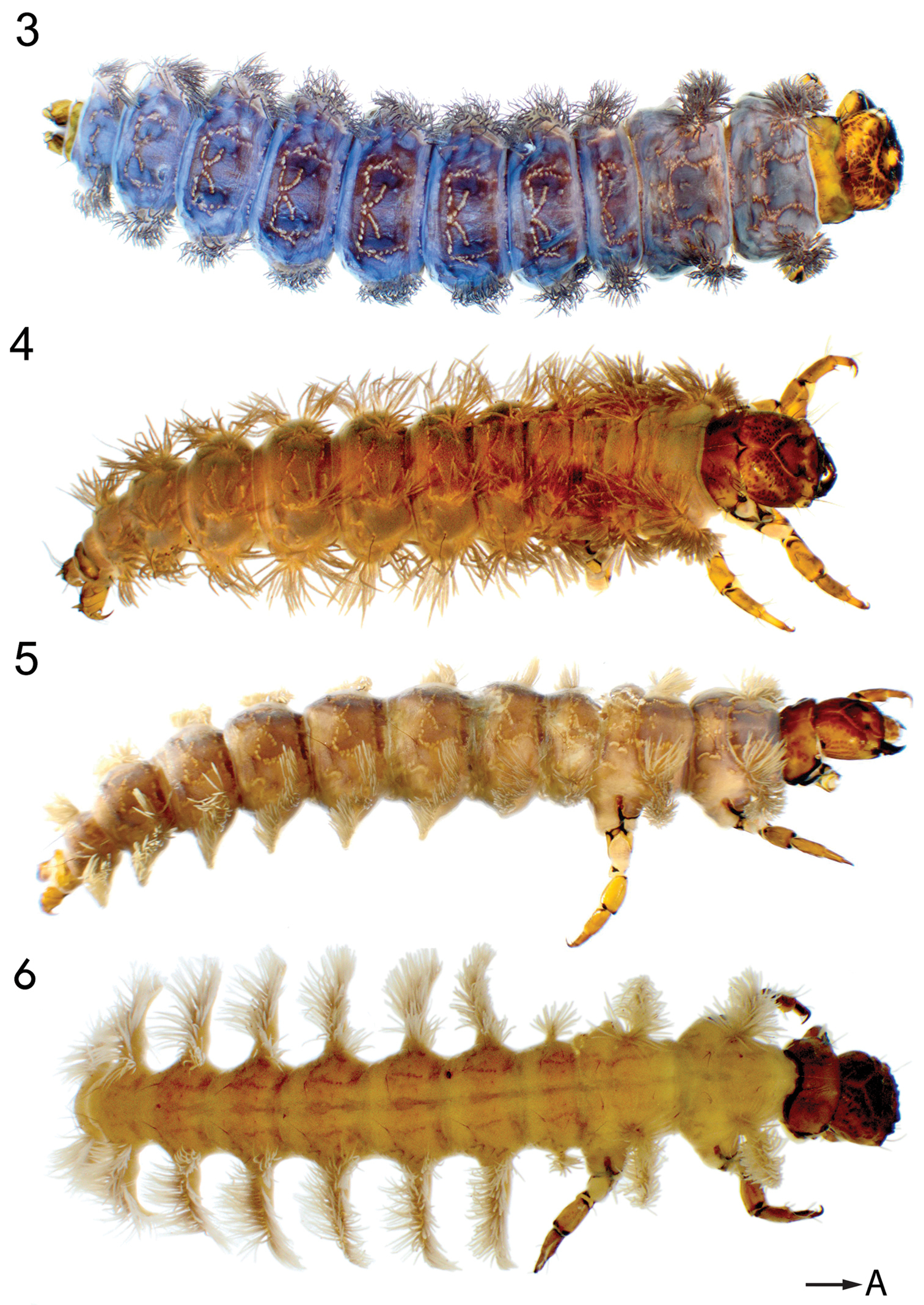
- Several Himalopsyche

Scientific classification
- Kingdom: Animalia
- Phylum: Arthropoda
- Clade: Pancrustacea
- Class: Insecta
- Order: Trichoptera
- Family: Rhyacophilidae
- Genus: Himalopsyche; Banks, 1940

= Himalopsyche =

Genus of caddisflies

Himalopsyche is a genus of free-living caddisflies in the family Rhyacophilidae. There are more than 40 described species in Himalopsyche.

== Species ==
These 46 species belong to the genus Himalopsyche:

- Himalopsyche acharai Malicky & Chantaramongkol, 1989
- Himalopsyche alticola Banks, 1940
- Himalopsyche amitabha Schmid, 1966
- Himalopsyche angnorbui Schmid, 1963
- Himalopsyche anomala Banks, 1940
- Himalopsyche auricularis (Martynov, 1914)
- Himalopsyche baibarana Matsumura, 1931
- Himalopsyche bhagirathi Schmid, 1963
- Himalopsyche biansata Kimmins, 1952
- Himalopsyche diehli Malicky, 1971
- Himalopsyche digitata (Martynov, 1935)
- Himalopsyche dolmasampa Schmid, 1963
- Himalopsyche elegantissima (Forsslund, 1935)
- Himalopsyche eos Malicky, 2000
- Himalopsyche excisa (Ulmer, 1905)
- Himalopsyche fasciolata Kimmins, 1952
- Himalopsyche gigantea (Martynov, 1914)
- Himalopsyche gregoryi (Ulmer, 1932)
- Himalopsyche gyamo Schmid, 1963
- Himalopsyche hageni Banks, 1940
- Himalopsyche hierophylax Schmid, 1966
- Himalopsyche horai (Martynov, 1936)
- Himalopsyche japonica (Morton, 1900)
- Himalopsyche kangsampa Schmid, 1966
- Himalopsyche kuldschensis (Ulmer, 1927)
- Himalopsyche lachlani Banks, 1940
- Himalopsyche lanceolata (Morton, 1900)
- Himalopsyche lepcha Schmid, 1963
- Himalopsyche lua Malicky, 1993
- Himalopsyche lungma Schmid, 1963
- Himalopsyche maculipennis (Ulmer, 1905)
- Himalopsyche maitreya Schmid, 1963
- Himalopsyche malenanda Schmid, 1963
- Himalopsyche martynovi Banks, 1940
- Himalopsyche maxima (Forsslund, 1935)
- Himalopsyche navasi Banks, 1940
- Himalopsyche paranomala Tian & Sun in Tian, Li, Yang & Sun, in Chen, editor, 1993
- Himalopsyche phedongensis Kimmins, 1952
- Himalopsyche phryganea (Ross, 1941)
- Himalopsyche placida Banks, 1947
- Himalopsyche sylvicola Mey, 1996
- Himalopsyche tibetana (Martynov, 1930)
- Himalopsyche todma Schmid, 1963
- Himalopsyche trifurcula Sun & Yang, 1994
- Himalopsyche yatrawalla Schmid, 1966
- Himalopsyche yongma Schmid, 1963
