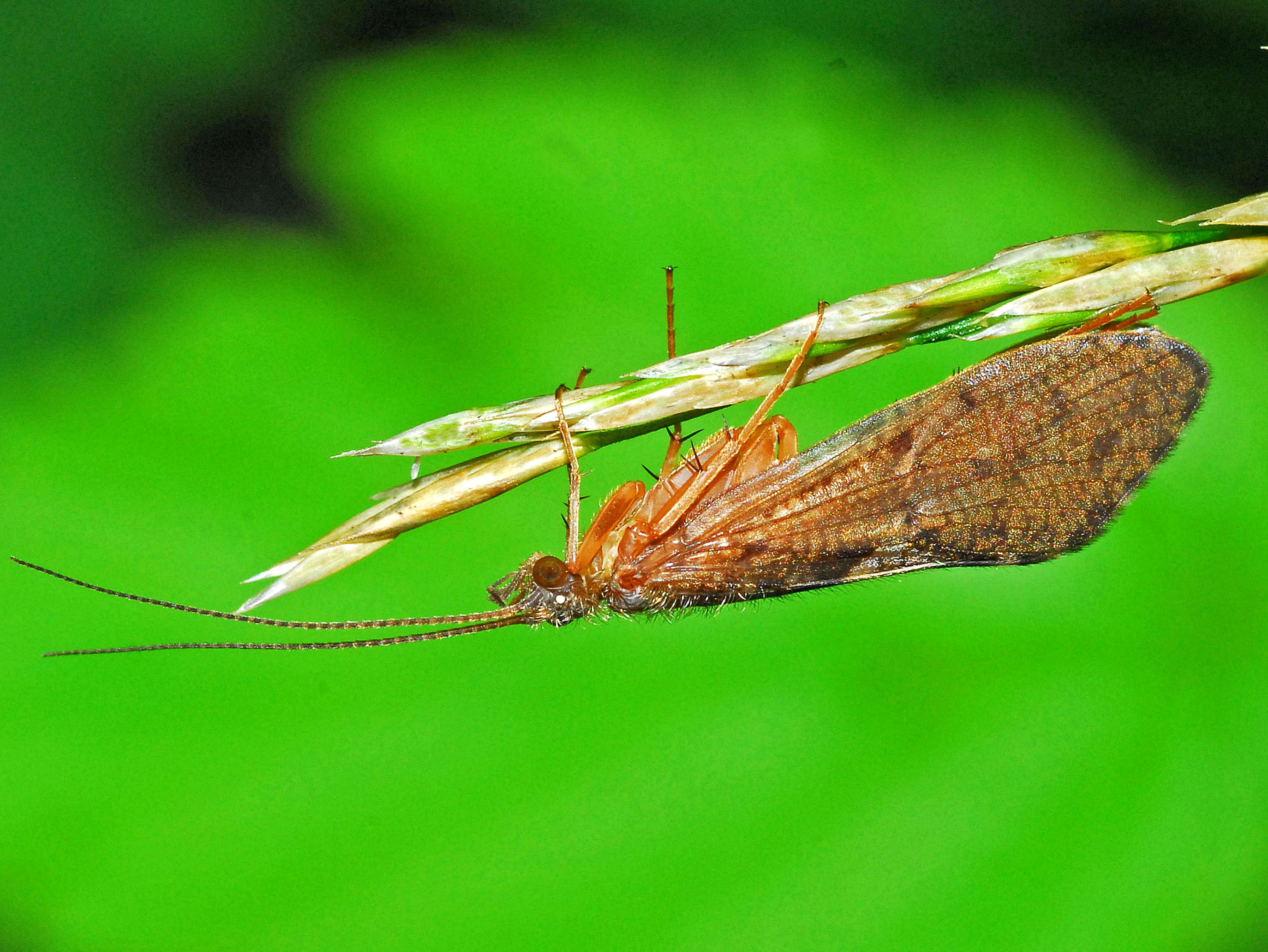
- Rhyacophila species imago

Scientific classification
- Kingdom: Animalia
- Phylum: Arthropoda
- Clade: Pancrustacea
- Class: Insecta
- Order: Trichoptera
- Family: Rhyacophilidae
- Genus: Rhyacophila; Pictet, 1834

= Rhyacophila =

Genus of caddisflies

Rhyacophila is a genus of caddisflies in the family Rhyacophilidae. There are at least 640 described species in Rhyacophila.

ITIS Taxonomic note:

- Type species: Rhyacophila vulgaris F.J. Pictet (selected by HH Ross, 1944, Bull Illinois Nat Hist Surv 23: 32).

== See also ==
- List of Rhyacophila species
