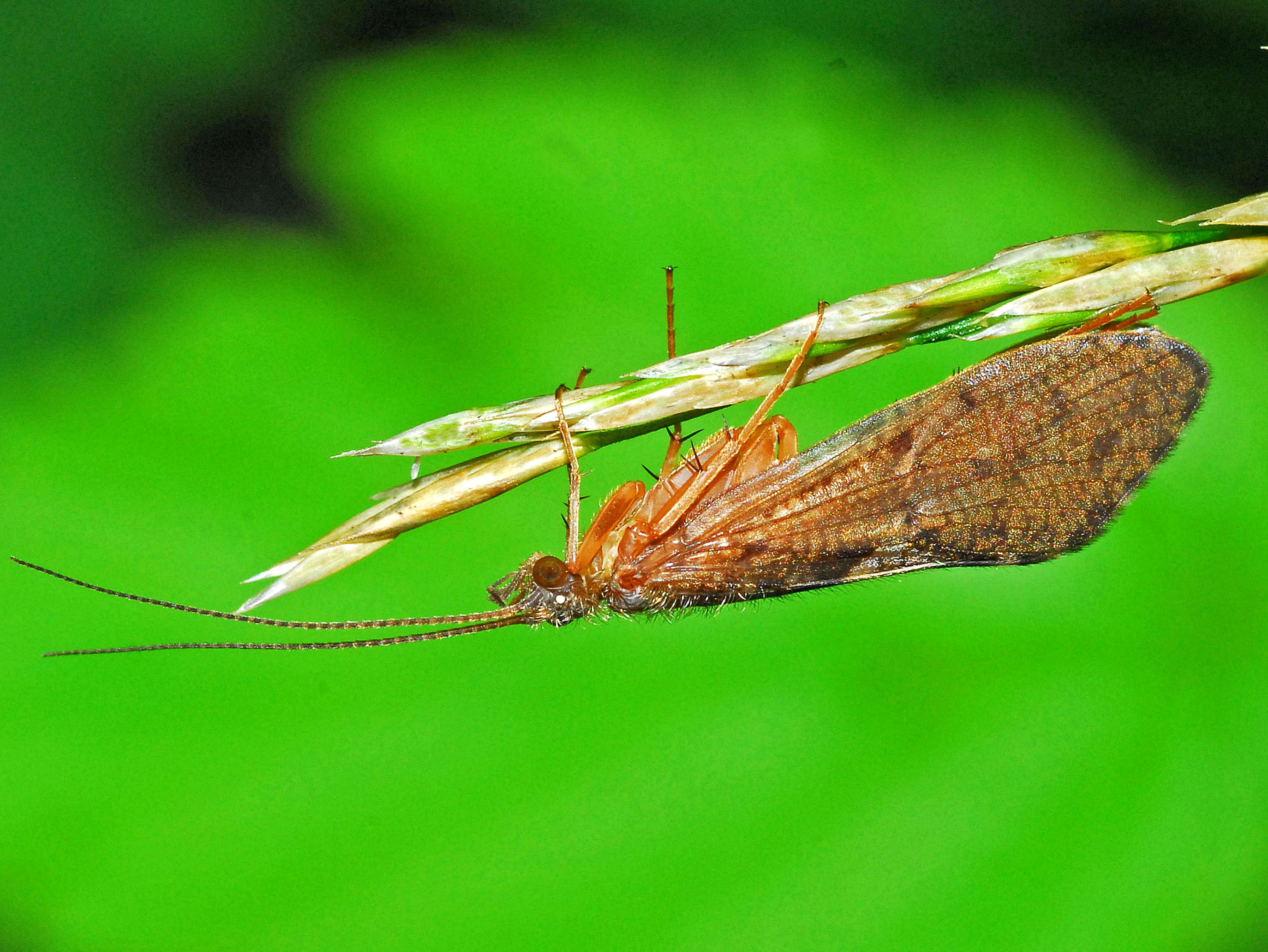
- Rhyacophila species imago

Scientific classification
- Kingdom: Animalia
- Phylum: Arthropoda
- Clade: Pancrustacea
- Class: Insecta
- Order: Trichoptera
- Superfamily: Rhyacophiloidea
- Family: Rhyacophilidae; Stephens, 1836

Genera
- Fansipangana; Himalopsyche; Philocrena; Rhyacophila

= Rhyacophilidae =

Family of caddisflies

The Rhyacophilidae are a family in the insect order of Trichoptera. Larvae of this family are free living and most species are predatory. The largest genus is Rhyacophila, with near 500 species distributed throughout the Northern Hemisphere.
