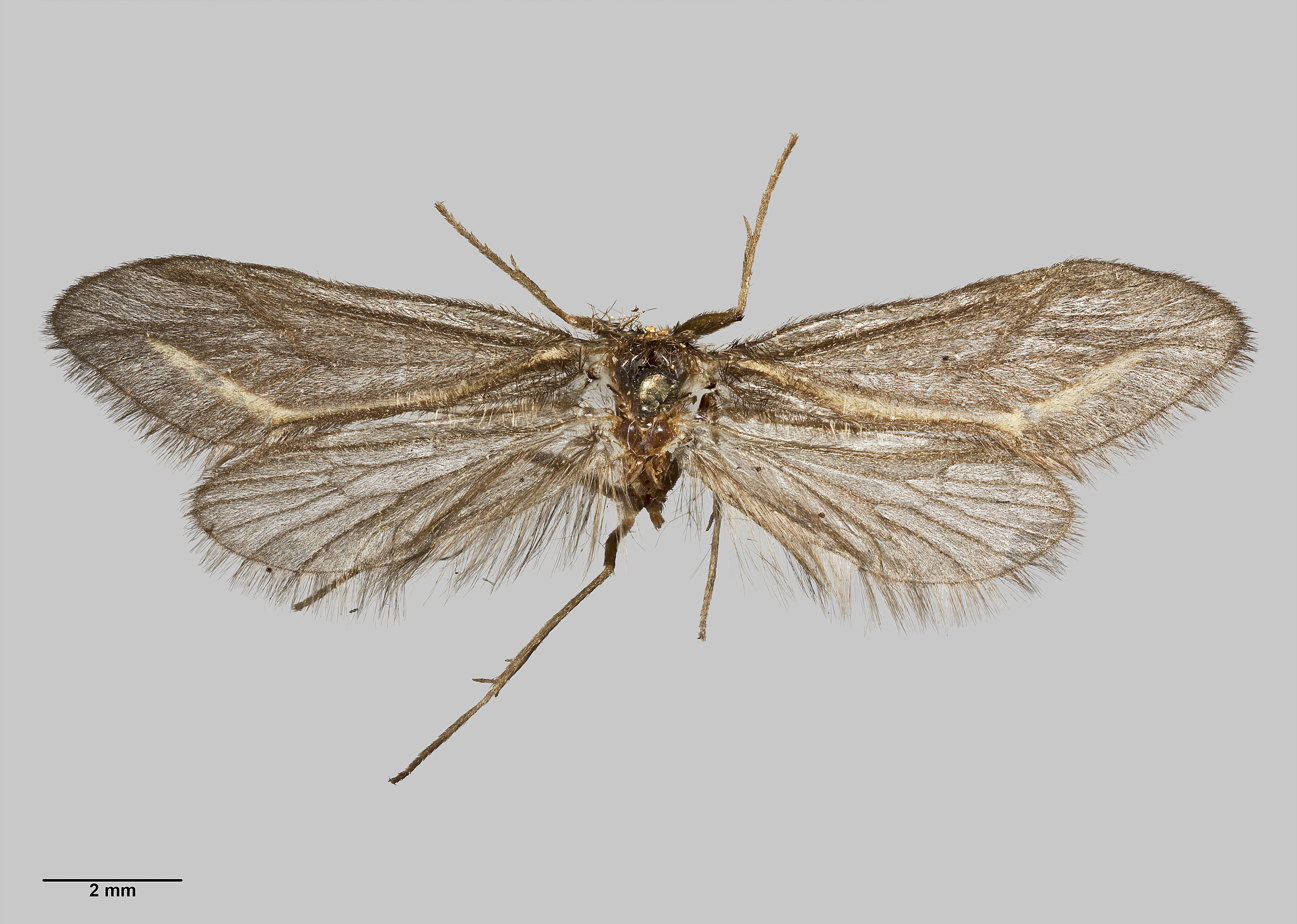
- Olinga fumosa

Scientific classification
- Kingdom: Animalia
- Phylum: Arthropoda
- Clade: Pancrustacea
- Class: Insecta
- Order: Trichoptera
- Family: Conoesucidae
- Genus: Olinga; McLachlan, 1894

Species
- See text

= Olinga (caddisfly) =

Genus of insects

Olinga is a genus of caddisflies belonging to the family Oeconesidae. The genus was described by Robert McLachlan in 1868, revising the genus name in 1894. All known species of Olinga are endemic to New Zealand.

== Taxonomy ==
Robert McLachlan originally described the genus in 1868 under the name Olinx, naming Olinx feredayi as the type species. In 1894 he revised the name of the genus as Olinga, describing this change as "necessary, and under rather peculiar circumstances" as German entomologist Arnold Förster had proposed Olynx for another genus in 1856, which other authors had been rendering as Olinx since 1858, thus leading McLachlan to erroneously conclude that his name was preoccupied. The genus was monotypic until 1958, when Keith Arthur John Wise described Olinga fumosa.

Phylogenetic analysis indicates that Olinga forms a clade with the genera Alloecentrella, Beraeoptera, Confluens, Pycnocentria and Pycnocentrodes.

== Distribution ==
The genus is found in New Zealand.

== Species ==
- Olinga christinae Ward & McKenzie, 1997
- Olinga feredayi (McLachlan, 1868)
- Olinga fumosa Wise, 1958
- Olinga jeanae McFarlane, 1966
