= Alloecentrella magnicornis =

Conservation status
- Not Threatened (NZ TCS)

Scientific classification
- Kingdom: Animalia
- Phylum: Arthropoda
- Clade: Pancrustacea
- Class: Insecta
- Order: Trichoptera
- Family: Calocidae
- Genus: Alloecentrella
- Species: A. magnicornis

Binomial name
- Alloecentrella magnicornis Wise, 1958

Species of caddisfly

Alloecentrella magnicornis is a species of caddisfly belonging to the order Trichoptera. The species was first described by Keith Arthur John Wise in 1958, and is endemic to New Zealand.

== Taxonomy ==
The holotype of the species was originally collected in the Waitākere Township area in 1934, and is housed in the Auckland War Memorial Museum. Alloecentrella magnicornis was not recognised as a distinct species until 1958. Wise created the genus Alloecentrella due to morphological differences found in Alloecentrella magnicornis not seen in other New Zealand caddisflies. The genus was monotypic until 2007.

Phylogenetic analysis indicates that Alloecentrella magnicornis forms a clade with Pycnocentrella eurensis, and is more distantly related to Pycnocentria species, Beraeoptera roria, Confluens hamiltoni, Pycnocentrodes aureolus and species of Olinga.

== Description ==
Wise's original text (the type description) reads as follows:

HEAD. Below and behind each eye an elongate wart with black hairs. A wart bearing long blackish setae behind each antenna. A wart bearing a short brush tuft of fuscous hairs in front of each antenna and between these a similar brush tuft of fuscous hairs arises. ANTENNAE. First joint slightly longer than head with moderately long fuscous and fulvous hairs. Remaining joints with ochreous hairs—not annulated. MAXILLARY PALPI five-jointed, the two short basal joints with moderately long ochreous hairs, apical joints with short ochreous pubescence. THORAX black, shining. WINGS, Hairs of both wings uniform fuscous—no pattern. ABDOMEN blackish, each tergite pale posteriorly. Length of anterior wing, 5 mm (0.20 in).

The larvae of the species has a frontoclypeus with lateral margins.

== Diet ==
Alloecentrella magnicornis feeds on liverworts and mosses.

== Distribution and habitat ==
The species is endemic to New Zealand, known to occur on the North Island. It is one of two Alloecentrella caddisflies known to occur on the North Island, alongside Alloecentrella incisus.

Alloecentrella magnicornis is often found in swift-flowing streams in the upper North Island, typically in forested areas where rock substrates allow liverworts and mosses to grow.

Adults and larvae of the species are known to be present from October to late February.
