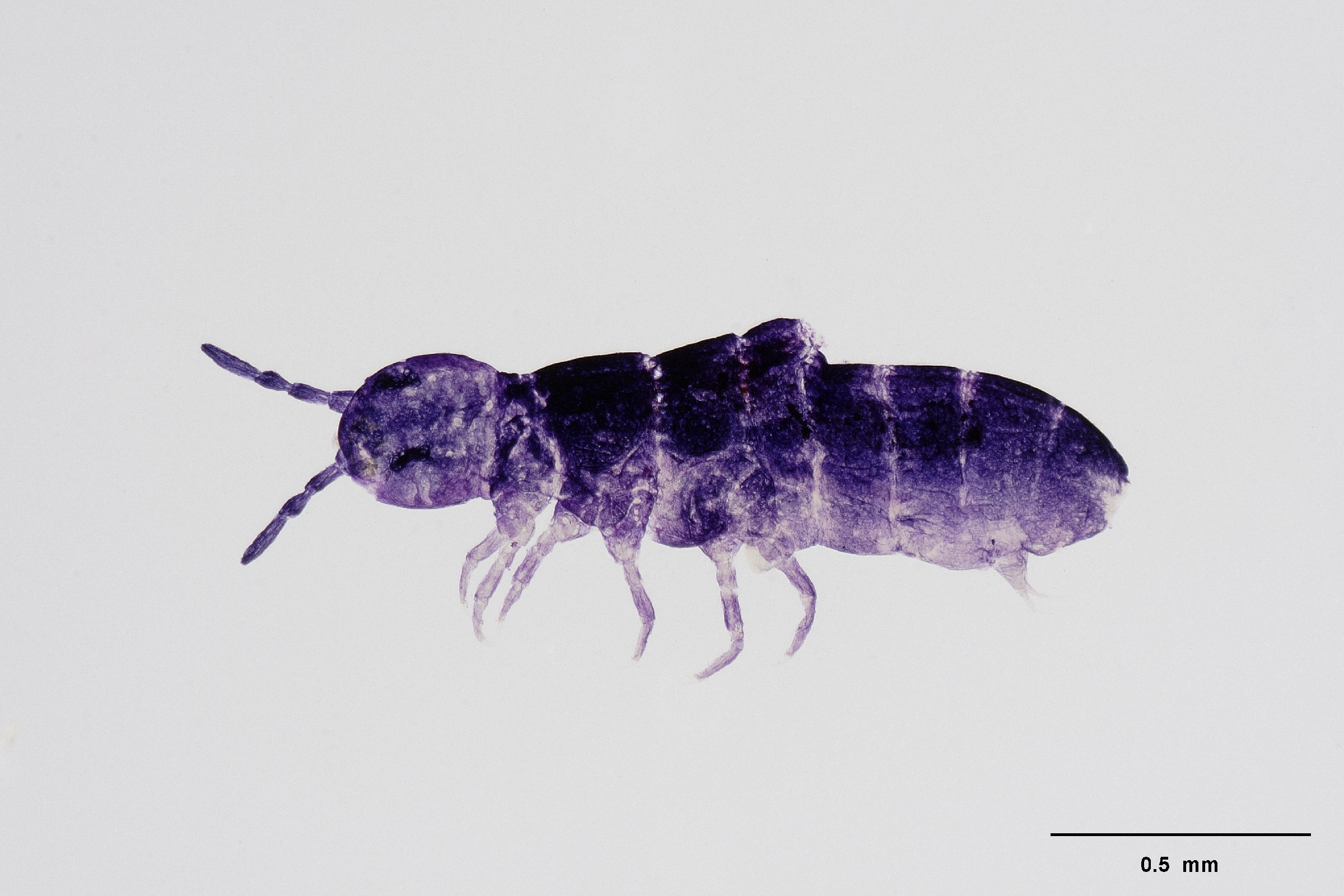
- Holotype of Cryptopygus campbellensis from the collections of Te Papa

Scientific classification
- Domain: Eukaryota
- Kingdom: Animalia
- Phylum: Arthropoda
- Class: Collembola
- Order: Entomobryomorpha
- Family: Isotomidae
- Genus: Cryptopygus
- Species: C. campbellensis

Binomial name
- Cryptopygus campbellensis Wise, 1964

= Cryptopygus campbellensis =

Species of springtail

Cryptopygus campbellensis is a species of springtail belonging to the family Isotomidae. The species was first described by Keith Arthur John Wise in 1964. The species is native to Campbell Island in the New Zealand Subantarctic Islands.

== Description ==
The species is deep blue to black in colour, with a body length of up to 1.5 mm (0.059 in). It can be differentiated from Cryptopygus antarcticus by having a rounded post-antennal organ.

== Distribution ==
The species is known to occur in the Campbell Islands. The holotype of the species was found at Rocky Bay on the south coast near Mount Dumas, under Tillaea in a penguin colony.
