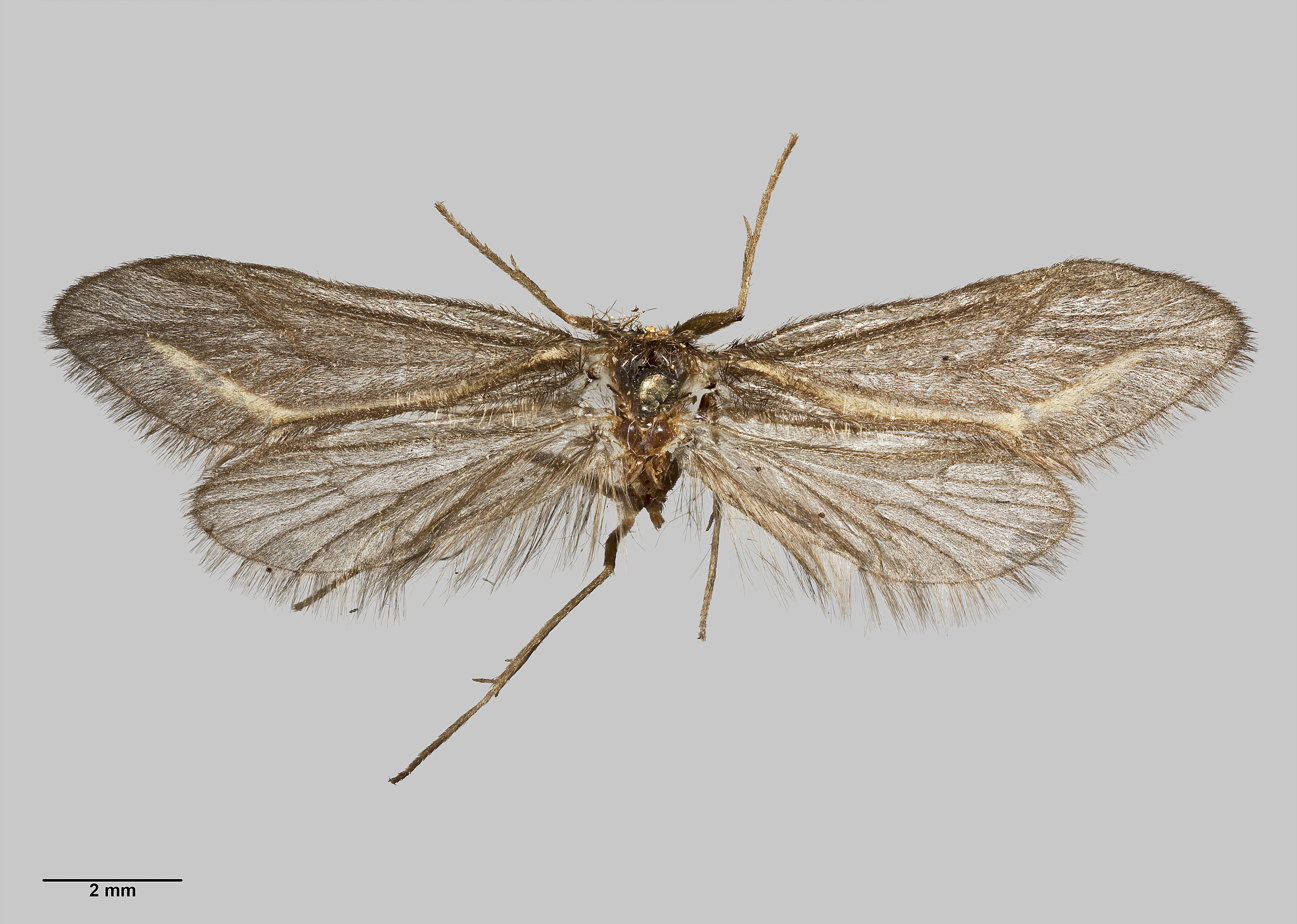
- Male holotype specimen held at Auckland War Memorial Museum

Conservation status
- Nationally Endangered (NZ TCS)

Scientific classification
- Kingdom: Animalia
- Phylum: Arthropoda
- Clade: Pancrustacea
- Class: Insecta
- Order: Trichoptera
- Family: Conoesucidae
- Genus: Olinga
- Species: O. fumosa

Binomial name
- Olinga fumosa Wise, 1958

= Olinga fumosa =

Species of caddisfly

Olinga fumosa is a species of caddisfly belonging to the family Conoesucidae. The species was first described by Keith Arthur John Wise in 1958, and is endemic to New Zealand.

== Taxonomy ==
The species was identified by Wise in 1958, based on a specimen collected from Waitati in 1917 by C. E. Clarke. No further specimens of the species were discovered until entomologist Brian H. Patrick discovered further specimens in 1992. Patrick confirmed that the species was distinct from other members of Olinga, based on behavioural differences and the apparent inability to hybridise with O. feredayi.

== Description ==
Wise's original text (the type description) reads as follows:

ANTERIOR WING fuscous; scales of longitudinal fold and sub-terminal furrow ochreous, Membranes of both anterior and posterior wings fumose. Spurs 2.2.4. Length of anterior wing, 8 mm (0.31 in). Genitalia♂. Margin of ninth segment with a pair of long dorsal processes with a wart on each side and a pencil of hairs below the wart. Dorsal portion of ninth segment produced downwards posteriorly with upper penis-cover in form of two short processes arising distally below. Penis membranous. Inferior appendages broad at the base and twisted over dorsally towards the apex, each with a long, sinuous, pointed spine arising from its extreme base. These spines pass on each side of the penis and terminate above it between the penis-cover processes. Seventh sternite with a short, broad process.

Males have a wingspan of 18.5 mm (0.73 in), with females larger at 22 mm (0.87 in).

Wise noted that the species was visually similar to O. feredayi, but could be identified by O. fumosa being smaller, darker in colour, differences in genitalia and the seventh sternite.

== Distribution and habitat ==
The species is endemic to New Zealand, found in the vicinity of Dunedin in the Otago Region and South Canterbury on the South Island of New Zealand.
