= Coccorhagidia keithi =

Scientific classification
- Domain: Eukaryota
- Kingdom: Animalia
- Phylum: Arthropoda
- Subphylum: Chelicerata
- Class: Arachnida
- Order: Trombidiformes
- Family: Rhagidiidae
- Genus: Coccorhagidia
- Species: C. keithi

Binomial name
- Coccorhagidia keithi Strandtmann, 1967

Species of mite

Coccorhagidia keithi is a species of prostig mite belonging to the family Rhagidiidae. The species was first described by Russell W. Strandtmann in 1967, and is found in Victoria Land, Antarctica.

== Taxonomy ==
The species was first described by Russell W. Strandtmann in 1967, who named the species after New Zealand entomologist Keith Arthur John Wise.

== Description ==
It is one of the largest known species of Antarctic mites.

== Distribution and habitat ==
The species is found Victoria Land, Antarctica, found in soil and under stones.
