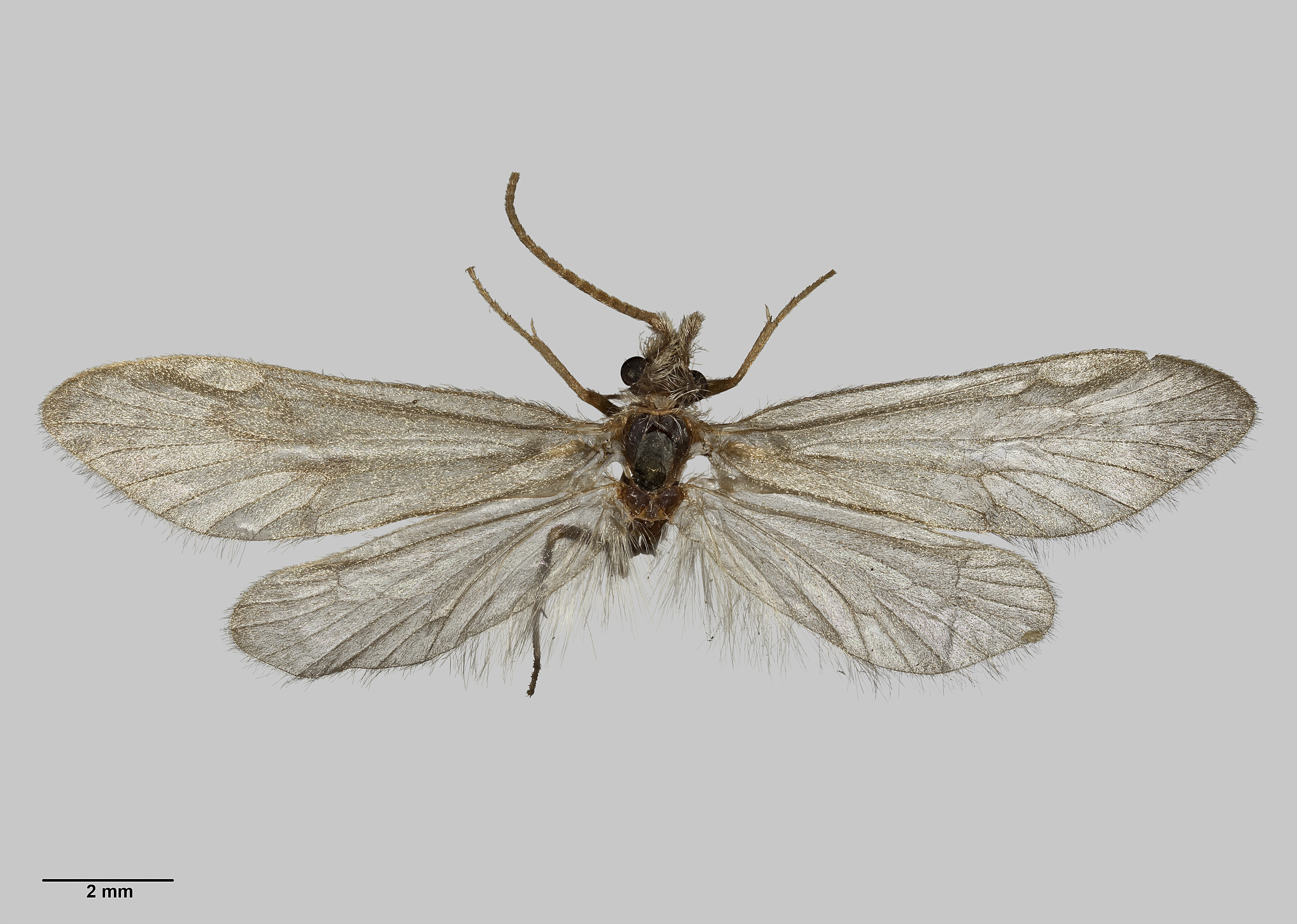
- Male holotype specimen held at Auckland War Memorial Museum

Conservation status
- Not Threatened (NZ TCS)

Scientific classification
- Kingdom: Animalia
- Phylum: Arthropoda
- Clade: Pancrustacea
- Class: Insecta
- Order: Trichoptera
- Family: Conoesucidae
- Genus: Pycnocentrodes
- Species: P. aeris

Binomial name
- Pycnocentrodes aeris Wise, 1958

= Pycnocentrodes aeris =

Species of caddisfly

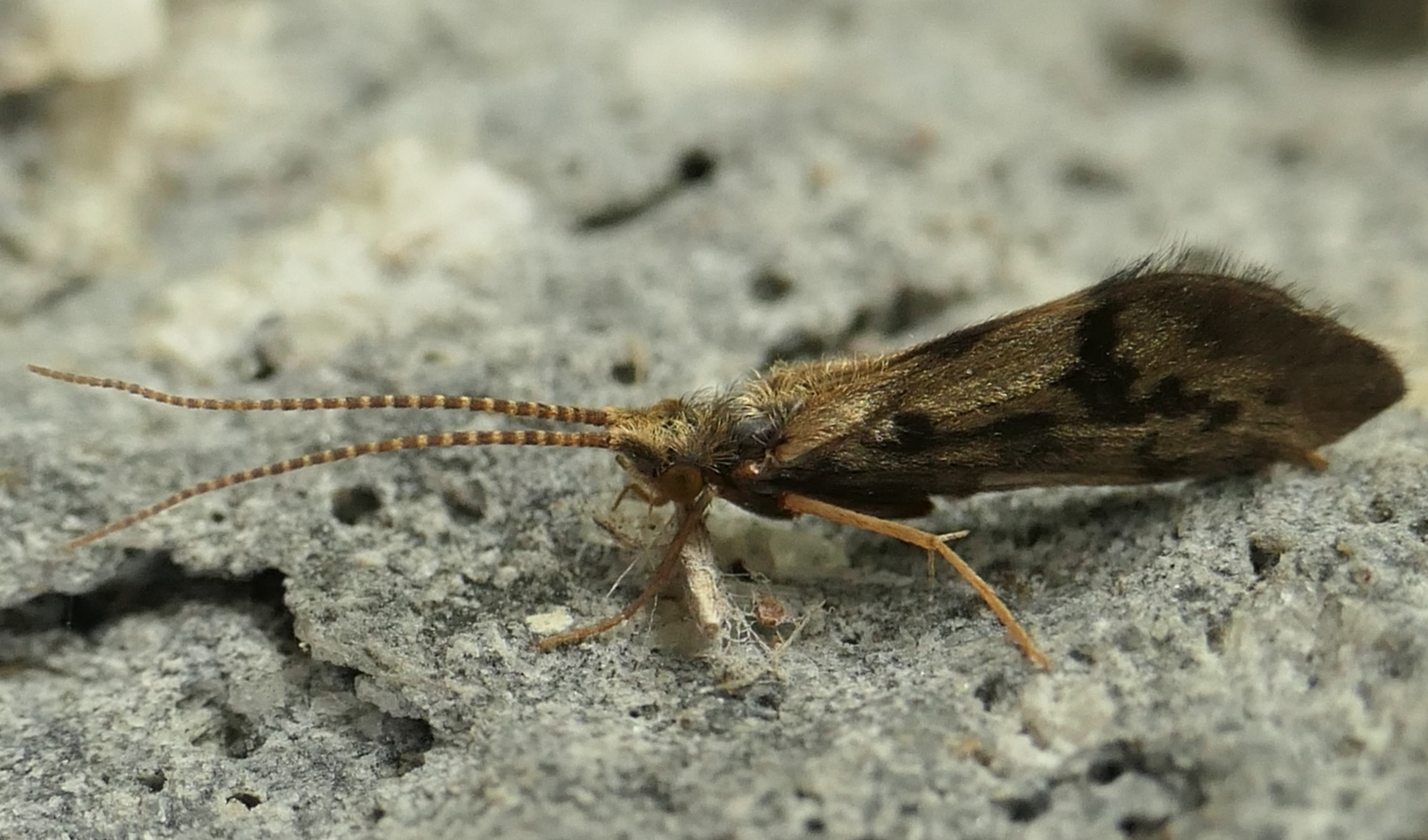
Pycnocentrodes aeris seen in suburban Christchurch

Pycnocentrodes aeris, also known as the common stony-cased caddisfly, is a species of caddisfly belonging to the family Conoesucidae. The species was first described by Keith Arthur John Wise in 1958, and is endemic to New Zealand.

== Taxonomy ==
The species was identified by Wise in 1958, based on a specimen collected from Kinloch on the northern shores of Lake Wakatipu in 1926 by C. E. Clarke.

== Description ==
Wise's original text (the type description) reads as follows:

ANTERIOR WING almost colourless, markings pale testaceous being two elongate transverse dots near base and two parallel transverse lines arising where S_{c} and R_{1} meet the costa and finishing at two-thirds where they join abruptly and continue as a single line almost to the dorsum just before the tornus. POSTERIOR WING almost colourless.

WING VENATION. Differs mainly from P. aureola (McLachlan) in the posterior wing where R_{2} and R_{3} arise separately, as in P. chiltoni

Tillyard, and from P. chiltoni in the anterior wing where apical fork 3 is fully formed, as in P. aureola. Length of anterior wing, 7–10 mm (0.28–0.39 in). Genitalia♂. Very close to P. aureola except that the spurs of the penis arise from its apex which is truncate and slightly bifid above. The spurs are moderately long, straight, and lie along each side of the penis..

Wise noted that the species could be differentiated from other Pycnocentrodes due to the colour and pattern of its anterior wings.

Specimens have an average forewing length of 8 mm (0.31 in) and hind wing length of 5.6 mm (0.22 in).

== Distribution and habitat ==
The species is endemic to New Zealand, and is the most widespread Pycnocentrodes in the country, found across both the North Island and South Island.

== Behaviour ==
P. aeris larvae form cases by binding together sand particles and silk, and occasionally repair damaged cases.
