= Confluens =

Confluens may refer to:

- Confluence of sinuses
- Confluens (caddisfly)
