= Confluens (caddisfly) =

Scientific classification
- Kingdom: Animalia
- Phylum: Arthropoda
- Clade: Pancrustacea
- Class: Insecta
- Order: Trichoptera
- Family: Conoesucidae
- Genus: Confluens; Wise, 1962

Species
- See text

Genus of insects

Confluens is a genus of caddisflies belonging to the family Oeconesidae. The genus was described by Keith Arthur John Wise in 1962, after noticing differences in two species previously placed within the genus Pycnocentrodes. Both species of Confluens are endemic to New Zealand.

== Taxonomy ==
Keith Arthur John Wise originally described the genus in 1962, naming Confluens hamiltoni as the type species. Both of the species he placed within the genus, C. hamiltoni and C. olingoides, had been identified in 1924 by Robert John Tillyard as species within the genus Pycnocentrodes.

Phylogenetic analysis indicates that Confluens forms a clade with the genera Alloecentrella, Beraeoptera, Olinga, Pycnocentria and Pycnocentrodes.

== Description ==
Wise's original text (the type description) reads as follows:

Ocelli absent; ♂ frons with a small hole on each side. Maxillary palpi, ♂, membranous, apparently two-jointed with transverse suture, as in Pycnocentrodes, but appearing as one in internal view; no brush of hairs from base. Wings, ♂ (fig. 1); anterior with a callosity at base, discoidal cell exceedingly narrow and long but abnormal apically, R_{2+3} and R_{4+5} rejoin to form a single stem from which apical forks 1 and 2 both arise, apical forks 1, 2, 3 and 5 present; posterior with R_{2+3} missing or only apical remnant present (as figured), discoidal cell open above, discoidal cross-vein and apical forks 1, 2 and 5 present. Wings, ♀, anterior as Pycnocentrodes, discoidal cell normal, apical forks 1, 2, 3 and 5 present; posterior as Pycnocentria, short discoidal cell present. Spurs 2. 2. 4.

Wise notes that the fusion of R_{2+3} and R_{4+5} is a distinguishing feature of this genus.

== Distribution ==
The genus is found in New Zealand.

== Species ==
- Confluens hamiltoni (Tillyard, 1924)
- Confluens olingoides (Tillyard, 1924)
