= Cryptopygus cisantarcticus =

Scientific classification
- Domain: Eukaryota
- Kingdom: Animalia
- Phylum: Arthropoda
- Class: Collembola
- Order: Entomobryomorpha
- Family: Isotomidae
- Genus: Cryptopygus
- Species: C. cisantarcticus

Binomial name
- Cryptopygus cisantarcticus Wise, 1967

Species of springtail

Cryptopygus cisantarcticus is a species of springtail belonging to the family Isotomidae. The species was first described by Keith Arthur John Wise in 1967. The species is native to the Cape Hallett area of Northern Victoria Land in East Antarctica and the surrounding offshore islands, including the Balleny Islands.

== Taxonomy ==
Cryptopygus cisantarcticus was identified in 1967, when Wise recognised consistent differences between Cryptopygus antarcticus found in the Cape Hallett area of Antarctica and the near-by Balleny Islands. The first known specimen was collected in 1962 by Madison E. Pryor, who identified it as Cryptopygus antarcticus. Genetic evidence suggests that Cryptopygus cisantarcticus diverged from other Antarctic species around 18-11 million years ago, possibly due to increased glaciation creating barriers between populations.

== Description ==
The species is deep blue to black in colour, with a body length of up to 1.75 mm (0.069 in). It can be distinguished from Cryptopygus antarcticus by the position and length patterns of the posterior setae.

== Distribution ==
The species is known to occur in the Cape Hallett area of Northern Victoria Land in East Antarctica and the surrounding offshore islands, including the Balleny Islands. The species is primarily found in moist algal flats, or underneath rocks in association with moss.
