= Polyplectropus impluvii =

Conservation status
- Not Threatened (NZ TCS)

Scientific classification
- Kingdom: Animalia
- Phylum: Arthropoda
- Clade: Pancrustacea
- Class: Insecta
- Order: Trichoptera
- Family: Polycentropodidae
- Genus: Polyplectropus
- Species: P. impluvii

Binomial name
- Polyplectropus impluvii Wise, 1962

Species of caddisfly

Polyplectropus impluvii is a species of caddisfly belonging to the family Polycentropodidae. The species was first described by Keith Arthur John Wise in 1962, and is endemic to New Zealand.

== Taxonomy ==
The species was identified by Wise in 1962, based on a specimen collected by Wise from a domestic water tank in Māngere, South Auckland in 1950.

== Description ==
Wise's original text (the type description) reads as follows:

A small species. Anterior wings medium brown, unicolorous except for a few faint, pale marginal spots about apex. Length of anterior wing, ♂, 7–7.5 mm (0.28–0.30 in)., ♀, 8.5–9 mm (0.33–0.35 in). Genitalia, ♂ (fig. 4). Ninth segment membranous above, not produced in a dorsal plate. Upper penis cover without inner dorsal processes. Outer process with a broad lateral portion, a long narrow spine arising above. In dorsal view spine appears to be slightly angled near base with a short setose inner projection at the angle. Penis with dorsal and ventral apical lobes truncate and with rounded lateral lobes. Inferior appendages moderately long, reduced before half way, thence slightly tapering, apex rounded. Dorsal basal area clear, almost transparent. On upper surfaces inner basal area with two quadrate plates.

== Distribution and habitat ==
The species is endemic to New Zealand.
