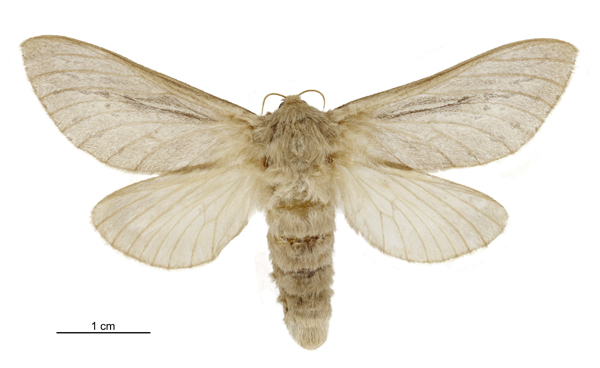
- Female specimen
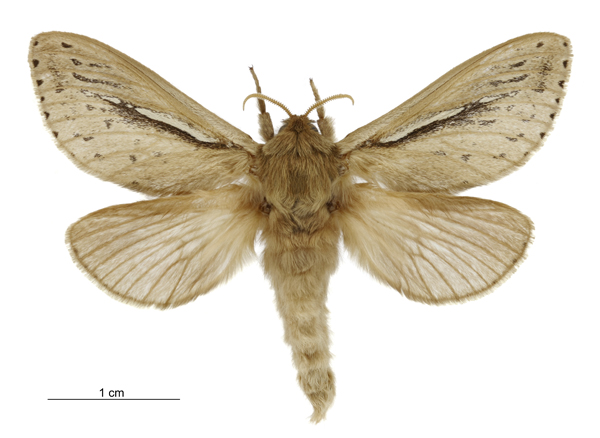
- Male specimen

Scientific classification
- Kingdom: Animalia
- Phylum: Arthropoda
- Clade: Pancrustacea
- Class: Insecta
- Order: Lepidoptera
- Family: Hepialidae
- Genus: Wiseana
- Species: W. umbraculata

Binomial name
- Wiseana umbraculata (Guenée, 1868)

Synonyms
- Pielus umbraculatus Guenée, 1868

= Wiseana umbraculata =

Species of moth

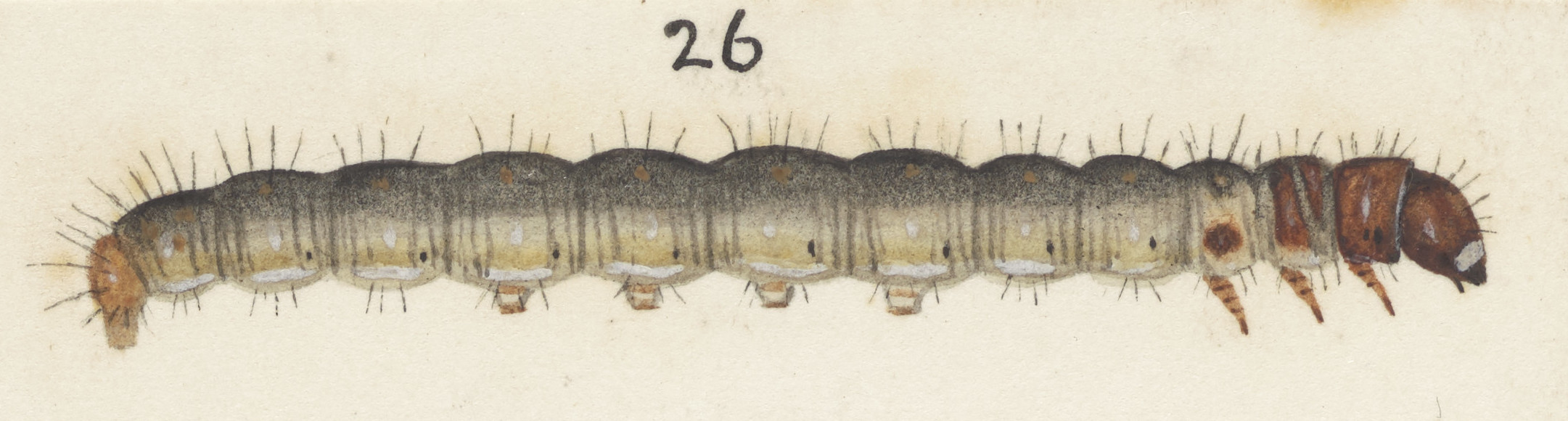
Wiseana umbraculata larva

Wiseana umbraculata, also known as the bog porina, is a species of moth belonging to the family Hepialidae. This species was regarded as being common in Whanganui in the early twentieth century.

== Description ==
The wingspan is 38–50 mm for males and 49–66 mm for females. Adults are on wing from September to April. Adult male and female bog porina can be told apart as the males are much darker in colour and have noticeable dark spots on their forewings. The females are lighter in colour with brown dots on their forewings. Caterpillars of W. umbraculata have a brown head with a dirty white and grey body. Without DNA technology, it is not possible to tell the different species of porina apart at the larval/caterpillar stage.

== Distribution ==
Bog porina occur throughout New Zealand; however, they are uncommon in the northern half of the North Island. W. umbraculata occupy habitats ranging from alpine regions to lowland plains. They are distributed from the central North Island to the bottom of the South Island. The larvae live in pasture, and can be very damaging. The preferred habitat for eggs and caterpillars is long dense pasture. They thrive in warm, moist conditions. Very hot, dry weather can decimate young porina populations, especially in short open pastures.

== Life cycle ==
Adult porina moths mate as soon as they emerge from the soil after completing the larval stage. The moths fly in spring, summer, and early autumn depending on location. The moths do not feed and only live a few days. During these few days, the female moth flies over pastures and releases around 3000 eggs. Her eggs will hatch within a few weeks. At first the newly hatched caterpillars will live above ground. They spend about 5 weeks on top of the soil feeding on plant matter and microflora. As the caterpillars grow larger, they burrow beneath the soil and construct permanent silk burrows which can reach a depth of around 30 cm. They will emerge from these burrows at night to feed. They sever grass and clover leaves at the base of the plant and drag them back to their burrow to consume. Porina caterpillars will moult seven or eight times over their lifetime. Development from egg to adult takes 12 months.

== Behaviour ==
Adults are attracted to light and have been collected via a mercury vapour light trap.

== Interactions ==
Porina are grazers, and are direct competitors with stock for food. Food plants for the larvae include species of grass. The larvae of W. umbraculata are regarded as a major pasture pest. Bog porina are prone to several diseases. Porina numbers are strongly influenced by diseases from naturally occurring pathogens in pasture. Many pathogens are dependent on porina. For pathogens to be effective, porina must be present in sufficient but not damaging numbers. In a stable environment such as tussock grasslands, porina pathogens regulate porina numbers so densities remain low. Under natural conditions, the Wiseana nucleopolyhedrosis virus can cause larval mortalities of up to ninety percent. Nucleopolyhedrosis virus causes larvae to swell with fluid and eventually die before decomposing. At the larval stage, porina will concentrate their foraging behaviours as close to the burrow entrance as possible. This results in the plants surrounding the burrow to be overgrazed and creates bare patches in the pasture.

== Further information ==
Heavy stocking and close grazing in the summer can reduce the survival of eggs and larvae. There are a few grasses which are not palatable to porina. Such as particular ryegrasses, cocksfoot and tall fescue. Having these grasses present in pasture will decrease the number of porina resulting in less pasture damage.
