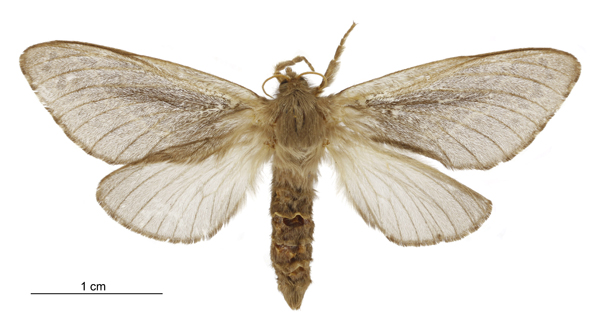
- Female specimen
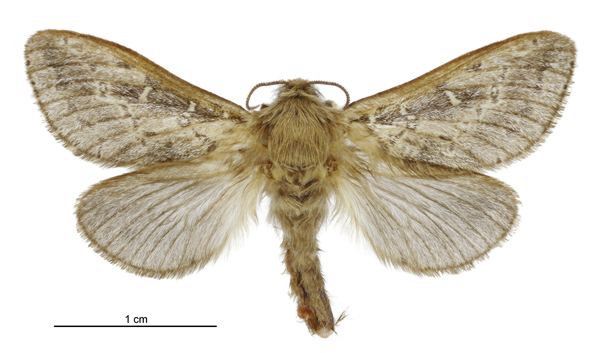
- Male specimen

Scientific classification
- Kingdom: Animalia
- Phylum: Arthropoda
- Clade: Pancrustacea
- Class: Insecta
- Order: Lepidoptera
- Family: Hepialidae
- Genus: Wiseana
- Species: W. fuliginea

Binomial name
- Wiseana fuliginea (Butler, 1879)

Synonyms
- Porina fuliginea Butler, 1879

= Wiseana fuliginea =

Species of moth

Wiseana fuliginea is a species of moth belonging to the family Hepialidae. It was first described by Arthur Gardiner Butler in 1879 and is endemic to New Zealand. In 2025 this species was classified as "data deficient" under the New Zealand Threat Classification System.

== Description ==
The wingspan is 27–38 mm for males and 33–47 mm for females. The colour of the forewings varies from pale to dark brown.

== Conservation status ==
In 2025 this species was classified by the New Zealand Department of Conservation as "data deficient" under the New Zealand Threat Classification System. This species is data poor as a result of the difficulty in identifying the species.
