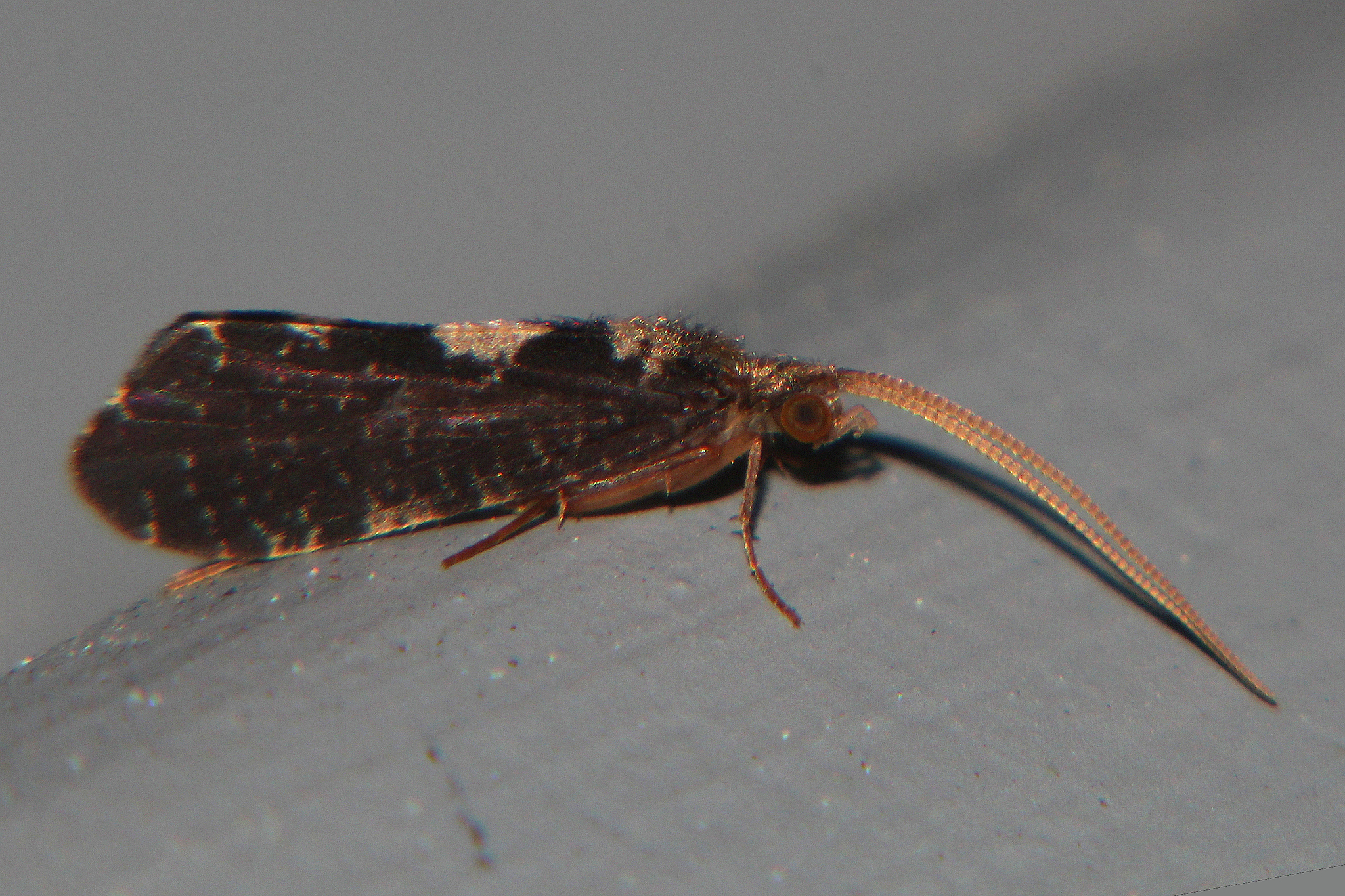
- Unknown species of Polyplectropus seen in Auckland, New Zealand

Scientific classification
- Kingdom: Animalia
- Phylum: Arthropoda
- Clade: Pancrustacea
- Class: Insecta
- Order: Trichoptera
- Family: Polycentropodidae
- Genus: Polyplectropus; Ulmer, 1905

Species
- See text

= Polyplectropus =

Genus of insects

Polyplectropus is a genus of caddisflies belonging to the family Polycentropodidae.

== Taxonomy ==
The genus was first identified in 1905 by German entomologist Georg Ulmer, who named P. flavicornis the type species. In 2010, the genus Eodipseudopsis Marlier, 1959 was synonymised with Polyplectropus.

== Distribution ==
The genus has a cosmopolitan distribution.

== Species ==
- Polyplectropus aberrus Johanson & Ward, 2009
- Polyplectropus acuminatus Li & Morse, 1997
- Polyplectropus acutus Li & Morse, 1997
- Polyplectropus admin Malicky & Chantaramongkol, 1993
- Polyplectropus africanus Marlier, 1943
- Polyplectropus ahas Malicky & Chantaramongkol, 1993
- Polyplectropus aiolos Malicky & Chantaramongkol, 1997
- Polyplectropus akrisios Malicky, 1997
- Polyplectropus alienus Bueno-Soria, 1990
- Polyplectropus alkyone Malicky & Chantaramongkol, 1997
- Polyplectropus alleni (Yamamoto, 1967)
- Polyplectropus alpheios Malicky, 1997
- Polyplectropus altera McFarlane, 1981
- Polyplectropus amarawathi Schmid, 1958
- Polyplectropus amphion Malicky, 1997
- Polyplectropus anakempat Malicky, 1995
- Polyplectropus anakgugur Malicky, 1995
- Polyplectropus anakjari Malicky, 1995
- Polyplectropus anakpungut Malicky, 1995
- Polyplectropus analis Banks, 1931
- Polyplectropus anchorus Vilarino, Albane & Calor, Adolfo R., 2015
- Polyplectropus angustus Johanson & Ward, 2009
- Polyplectropus annulicornis Ulmer, 1905
- Polyplectropus antinoos Malicky, 1998
- Polyplectropus aoupiniensis Johanson & Ward, 2009
- Polyplectropus arni Malicky & Chantaramongkol, 1993
- Polyplectropus assimulans Mey, 1998
- Polyplectropus aurifusca McFarlane, 1956
- Polyplectropus auriplicatus Vilarino & Calor, 2015
- Polyplectropus bamboosa Cartwright & Dostine, 2022
- Polyplectropus banksianus Flint, 1971
- Polyplectropus baring Malicky, 1993
- Polyplectropus basimaculatus Mey, 1998
- Polyplectropus bay Malicky, 1995
- Polyplectropus beccus SW Hamilton & RW Holzenthal, 2005
- Polyplectropus berryensis Cartwright & Dostine, 2022
- Polyplectropus beutelspacheri Bueno-Soria, 1990
- Polyplectropus boas Malicky, 1993
- Polyplectropus brachyscolus Flint, 1971
- Polyplectropus bradleyi Kimmins, 1957
- Polyplectropus bravoae Bueno-Soria, 1990
- Polyplectropus bredini Flint, 1968
- Polyplectropus buchwaldi (Ulmer, 1911)
- Polyplectropus caledonia Johanson & Ward, 2009
- Polyplectropus canastra Rocha, Dumas & Nessimian, 2016
- Polyplectropus cardinis Mey, 1990
- Polyplectropus carolae Bueno-Soria, 1990
- Polyplectropus chapmani Kumanski, 1979
- Polyplectropus charlesi (Ross, 1941)
- Polyplectropus chin Malicky, 1995
- Polyplectropus christinae Johanson & Ward, 2009
- Polyplectropus clavus Johanson & Ward, 2009
- Polyplectropus convexus Zhong, Yang & Morse 2006
- Polyplectropus costalis (Banks, 1913)
- Polyplectropus crocallis Mey, 1998
- Polyplectropus cubitalis Zhong, Yang & Morse, 2010
- Polyplectropus curvatus Li & Morse, 1997
- Polyplectropus curvispinus Johanson & Ward, 2009
- Polyplectropus cuspidatus Neboiss, 1989
- Polyplectropus dairi Malicky, 1993
- Polyplectropus deimos Malicky, 2000
- Polyplectropus deltoides (Yamamoto, 1967)
- Polyplectropus denticulus Bueno-Soria, 1990
- Polyplectropus dhinkari Malicky, 1979
- Polyplectropus diastictis Mey, 1998
- Polyplectropus didactylus Neboiss, 1989
- Polyplectropus directus Mey, 1990
- Polyplectropus dorsospinus Johanson & Ward, 2009
- Polyplectropus dubitatus Flint, 1983
- Polyplectropus elmadam Malicky, 1993
- Polyplectropus elongatus (Yamamoto, 1966)
- Polyplectropus epitychmus Neboiss, 1989
- Polyplectropus eubolus Mey, 1998
- Polyplectropus evocatus Mey, 1998
- Polyplectropus exallus Neboiss, 1989
- Polyplectropus exilis Chamorro-Lacayo & Holzenthal, 2004
- Polyplectropus fijianus Banks, 1936
- Polyplectropus flavicornis Ulmer, 1905
- Polyplectropus fuscatus Flint, 1983
- Polyplectropus gedehensis Ulmer, 1951
- Polyplectropus grandis Banks, 1937
- Polyplectropus greenwoodi Mosely, 1941
- Polyplectropus hamatiformis Mey, 1990
- Polyplectropus hamatus Bueno-Soria, 1990
- Polyplectropus hamulus Flint, 1972
- Polyplectropus herrerai Bueno-Soria & Hamilton, 1990
- Polyplectropus himachalica Pandher & Parey, 2018
- Polyplectropus hovmoelleri Johanson & Ward, 2009
- Polyplectropus impluvii Wise, 1962
- Polyplectropus inaequalis Ulmer, 1927
- Polyplectropus inarmatus Flint, 1971
- Polyplectropus inusitatus Hsu & Chen, 1996
- Polyplectropus involutus Li & Morse, 1997
- Polyplectropus irroratus Banks, 1931
- Polyplectropus jalan Oláh & Johanson 2010
- Polyplectropus jannai Malicky, 1993
- Polyplectropus javanicus Ulmer, 1905
- Polyplectropus jonam Malicky, 1993
- Polyplectropus joram Malicky, 1993
- Polyplectropus jorim Malicky, 1993
- Polyplectropus josaphat Malicky, 1993
- Polyplectropus jotham Malicky, 1993
- Polyplectropus kailashchandrai Pandher & Parey, 2018
- Polyplectropus karsholti Malicky, 1994
- Polyplectropus kingsolveri Bueno-Soria, 1990
- Polyplectropus koueus Johanson & Ward, 2009
- Polyplectropus kristyantoi Malicky, 1998
- Polyplectropus lacusalbinae Kimmins, 1953
- Polyplectropus laminatus (Yamamoto, 1966)
- Polyplectropus maiyarap Malicky & Chantaramongkol, 1993
- Polyplectropus manasse Malicky & Chantaramongkol, 1993
- Polyplectropus manni Banks, 1936
- Polyplectropus matadapaya Schmid, 1958
- Polyplectropus mathisi Bueno-Soria, 1990
- Polyplectropus matthatha Malicky & Chantaramongkol, 1993
- Polyplectropus melchi Malicky, 1993
- Polyplectropus melea Malicky, 1993
- Polyplectropus menna Malicky & Chantaramongkol, 1993
- Polyplectropus mignonae Bueno-Soria, 1990
- Polyplectropus millei Johanson & Ward, 2009
- Polyplectropus mindamelea Mey, 1998
- Polyplectropus misolja Bueno-Soria, 1990
- Polyplectropus monticola Ulmer, 1930
- Polyplectropus musiriel Malicky & Mey, 2020
- Polyplectropus nahor Malicky & Chantaramongkol, 1993
- Polyplectropus nam Malicky, 1995
- Polyplectropus nangajna Malicky & Chantaramongkol, 1993
- Polyplectropus nanjingensis Li & Morse, 1997
- Polyplectropus narifer Flint, 1974
- Polyplectropus nathalae Johanson & Ward, 2009
- Polyplectropus nayaritensis Bueno-Soria, 1990
- Polyplectropus nocturnus Arefina, 1996
- Polyplectropus nodyg Johanson & Ward, 2009
- Polyplectropus nubigenus (Hagen, 1859)
- Polyplectropus oaxaquensis Bueno-Soria, 1990
- Polyplectropus obed Malicky, 1993
- Polyplectropus orientalis (McLachlan, 1866)
- Polyplectropus panamensis Bueno-Soria, 1990
- Polyplectropus papei Johanson & Ward, 2009
- Polyplectropus parakrama Schmid, 1958
- Polyplectropus paysandu Angrisano, 1994
- Polyplectropus pernodensis Johanson & Ward, 2009
- Polyplectropus perspersus Mey, 1998
- Polyplectropus philippinensis Ulmer, 1930
- Polyplectropus phrixos Malicky & Changthong, 2006
- Polyplectropus piroguensis Johanson & Ward, 2009
- Polyplectropus prapat Malicky, 1993
- Polyplectropus profaupar RW Holzenthal & GL de Almeida, 2003
- Polyplectropus protensus Ulmer, 1908
- Polyplectropus proukaewi Malicky & Seetapan, 2020
- Polyplectropus puerilis (McLachlan, 1868)
- Polyplectropus pugiunculatus Botosaneanu, 1993
- Polyplectropus puhia McFarlane, 1956
- Polyplectropus ranauensis Ulmer, 1951
- Polyplectropus recurvatus (Yamamoto, 1966)
- Polyplectropus rehabeam Malicky, 1993
- Polyplectropus robacki (Yamamoto, 1966)
- Polyplectropus rondoniensis Chamorro & Holzenthal, 2010
- Polyplectropus sabael Malicky & Mey, 2020
- Polyplectropus sainii Pandher & Parey, 2018
- Polyplectropus san Malicky, 1995
- Polyplectropus santiago (Ross, 1947)
- Polyplectropus simei Malicky, 1993
- Polyplectropus sitahoan Malicky, 1993
- Polyplectropus sourya Schmid, 1960
- Polyplectropus spiculifer Flint, 1971
- Polyplectropus squalus Bueno-Soria, 1990
- Polyplectropus subteres Zhong, Yang & Morse, 2010
- Polyplectropus tachiaensis Hsu & Chen, 1996
- Polyplectropus taleban Malicky & Chantaramongkol, 1993
- Polyplectropus tam Malicky, 1995
- Polyplectropus taoensis Johanson & Ward, 2009
- Polyplectropus tenerus Johanson & Ward, 2009
- Polyplectropus tepequemensis Neto, Pes & Hamada, 2017
- Polyplectropus tharah Malicky & Chantaramongkol, 1993
- Polyplectropus thilus (Denning, 1962)
- Polyplectropus tianmushanensis Zhong, Yang & Morse, 2010
- Polyplectropus torrenticola Kimmins, 1955
- Polyplectropus tragularius Chamorro-Lacayo & Holzenthal, 2010
- Polyplectropus triangulatus Johanson & Ward, 2009
- Polyplectropus tridentatus Zhong & Morse, 2010
- Polyplectropus trilobatus Flint, 1981
- Polyplectropus ulmeri Banks, 1937
- Polyplectropus ulmeriana Flint, 1983
- Polyplectropus umbonatus Neboiss, 1989
- Polyplectropus unicolor Banks, 1931
- Polyplectropus vanuatu Oláh & Johanson, 2010
- Polyplectropus viklundi Johanson & Ward, 2009
- Polyplectropus waitakerensis Wise, 1962
- Polyplectropus yndog Johanson & Ward, 2009
- Polyplectropus zaragozai Bueno-Soria, 1990
