= Cryptopygus agreni =

Scientific classification
- Domain: Eukaryota
- Kingdom: Animalia
- Phylum: Arthropoda
- Class: Collembola
- Order: Entomobryomorpha
- Family: Isotomidae
- Genus: Cryptopygus
- Species: C. agreni

Binomial name
- Cryptopygus agreni (Börner, 1903)

Synonyms
- Isotoma agreni Bomer, 1903; Isotoma (Isotomina) agreni Börner, 1903

Species of springtail

Cryptopygus agreni is a species of springtail in the genus Cryptopygus. It is sometime considered a synonym for Hemisotoma pontica (Stach, 1947)
