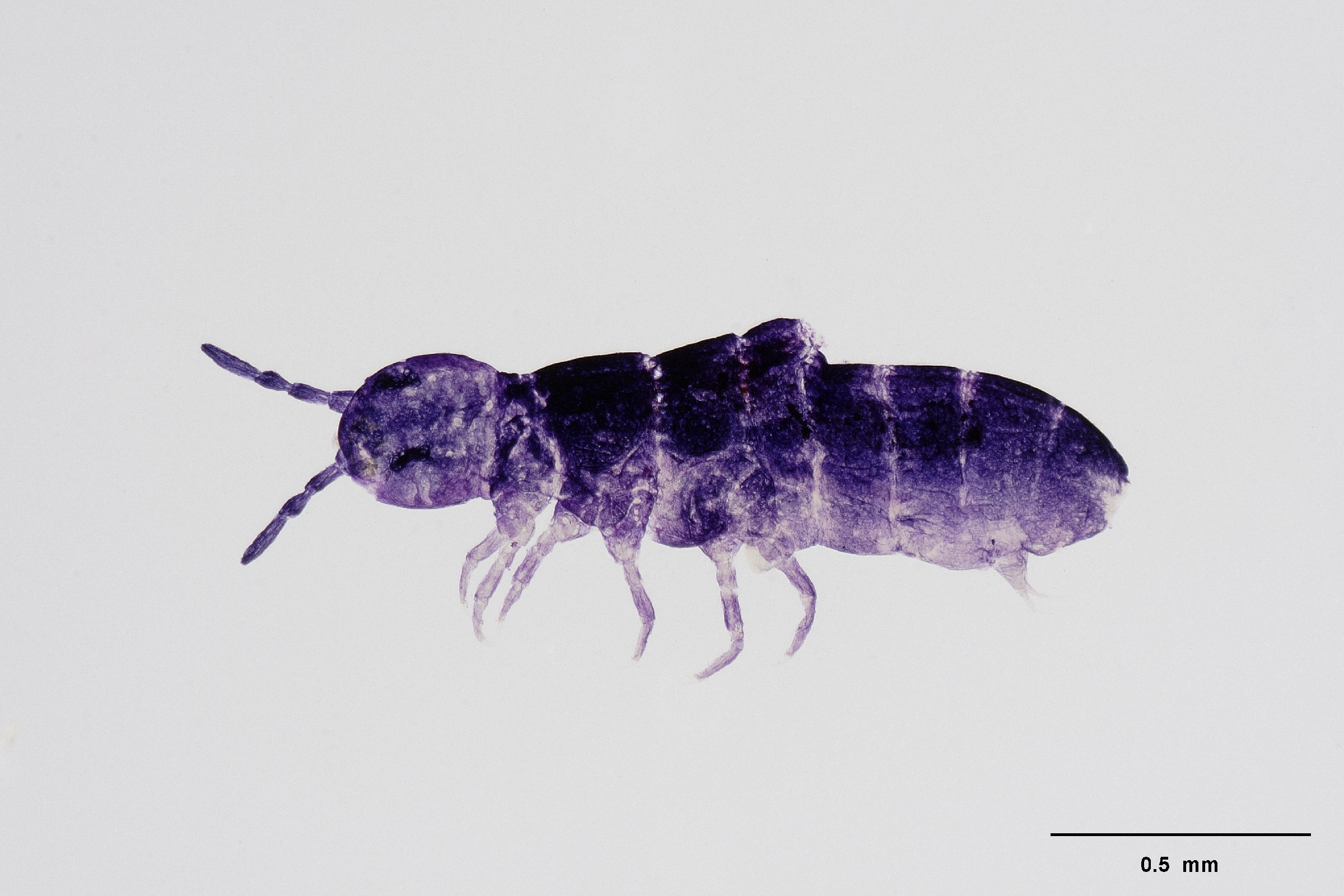
- Cryptopygus campbellensis

Scientific classification
- Kingdom: Animalia
- Phylum: Arthropoda
- Class: Collembola
- Order: Entomobryomorpha
- Family: Isotomidae
- Subfamily: Anurophorinae
- Genus: Cryptopygus; Willem, 1901

Species
- See text

Synonyms
- Neocryptopygus (Salmon, 1965); Proisotomina (Salmon, 1948)

= Cryptopygus =

Genus of springtails

Cryptopygus is a genus of springtails. Cryptopygus belongs to the Isotomidae family.

== Species ==
- Cryptopygus agreni (Börner, 1903)
- Cryptopygus albaredai Selga 1962
- Cryptopygus albus Yosii 1939
- Cryptopygus ambus Christiansen and Bellinger, 1980
- Cryptopygus andinus DÌaz & Najt 1995
- Cryptopygus annobonensis Selga 1962
- Cryptopygus anomala Linnaniemi 1912
- Cryptopygus antarcticus Willem, 1901
- Cryptopygus aquae (Bacon, 1914)
- Cryptopygus araucanus Massoud & Rapoport 1968
- Cryptopygus arcticus Christiansen and Bellinger, 1980
- Cryptopygus axayacatl Palacios & Thibaud, 2001
- Cryptopygus badasa Greenslade 1995
- Cryptopygus beijiangensis Hao & Huang 1995
- Cryptopygus benhami Christiansen and Bellinger, 1980
- Cryptopygus binoculatus Deharveng 1981
- Cryptopygus bipunctatus (Axelson, 1903)
- Cryptopygus bituberculatus (Wahlgren, 1906)
- Cryptopygus caecus Wahlgren 1906
- Cryptopygus campbellensis Wise 1964
- Cryptopygus cardusi Selga 1962
- Cryptopygus caussaneli Thibaud 1996
- Cryptopygus cinctus Wahlgren 1906
- Cryptopygus cisantarcticus Wise 1967
- Cryptopygus coeruleogriseus (Hammer, 1938)
- Cryptopygus constrictus (Folsom, 1937)
- Cryptopygus debilis (Cassagnau, 1959)
- Cryptopygus decemoculatus (Salmon, 1949)
- Cryptopygus delamarei Poinsot 1970
- Cryptopygus dubius Deharveng 1981
- Cryptopygus elegans (Cardoso, 1973)
- Cryptopygus elegans (Rapoport & Izarra, 1962)
- Cryptopygus exilis (Gisin, 1960)
- Cryptopygus hirsutus (Denis, 1931)
- Cryptopygus indecisus Massoud & Rapoport 1968
- Cryptopygus indicus Brown 1932
- Cryptopygus insignis Massoud & Rapoport 1968
- Cryptopygus interruptus Schött 1927
- Cryptopygus kahuziensis Martynova 1978
- Cryptopygus lamellatus (Salmon, 1941)
- Cryptopygus lapponicus (Brown, 1931)
- Cryptopygus lawrencei Deharveng 1981
- Cryptopygus loftyensis (Womersley 1934)
- Cryptopygus mauretanica Handschin 1925
- Cryptopygus maximus Deharveng 1981
- Cryptopygus minimus Salmon, 1941
- Cryptopygus nanjiensis Shao, Zhang, Ke, Yue & Yin, 2000
- Cryptopygus novaezealandiae (Salmon, 1943)
- Cryptopygus novazealandia (Salmon, 1941)
- Cryptopygus oeensis (Caroli, 1914)
- Cryptopygus parallelus (Wahlgren, 1901)
- Cryptopygus parasiticus (Salmon, 1943)
- Cryptopygus patagonicus Izarra 1972
- Cryptopygus pentatomus (Börner, 1906)
- Cryptopygus perisi Selga 1960
- Cryptopygus pilosus (Womersley, 1934)
- Cryptopygus ponticus (Stach, 1947)
- Cryptopygus pseudominuta Schött 1927
- Cryptopygus quadrioculatus (Rapoport, 1963)
- Cryptopygus quadrioculatus Martynova 1967
- Cryptopygus quadrioculatus Yoshii 1995
- Cryptopygus quinqueoculatus Izarra 1970
- Cryptopygus reagens Enderlein 1909
- Cryptopygus riebi Barra 1997
- Cryptopygus scapelliferus (Gisin, 1955)
- Cryptopygus separatus (Denis, 1931)
- Cryptopygus sphagneticola (Linnaniemi, 1912)
- Cryptopygus subalpinus (Salmon, 1944)
- Cryptopygus subantarcticus Wise 1970
- Cryptopygus sverdrupi Lawrence 1978
- Cryptopygus tasmaniensis Womersley 1942
- Cryptopygus terranovus (Wise, 1967)
- Cryptopygus thermophilus (Axelson 1900)
- Cryptopygus tingus
- Cryptopygus travei Deharveng 1981
- Cryptopygus tricuspis Enderlein 1909
- Cryptopygus tridentatus Handschin 1929
- Cryptopygus triglenus Ellis 1976
- Cryptopygus trioculatus Izarra 1972
- Cryptopygus vtorovi Martynova 1978
- Cryptopygus yosiii Izarra, 1965
- Cryptopygus zenderi (Winter, 1967)
