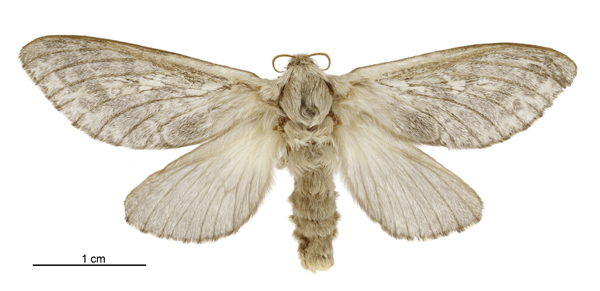
- Female specimen
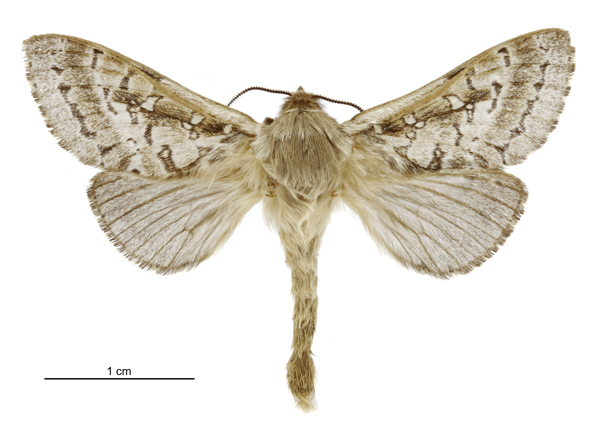
- Male specimen

Scientific classification
- Kingdom: Animalia
- Phylum: Arthropoda
- Clade: Pancrustacea
- Class: Insecta
- Order: Lepidoptera
- Family: Hepialidae
- Genus: Wiseana
- Species: W. mimica

Binomial name
- Wiseana mimica (Philpott, 1923)

Synonyms
- Porina mimica Philpott, 1923

= Wiseana mimica =

Species of moth

Wiseana mimica is a species of moth belonging to the family Hepialidae. It was described by Alfred Philpott in 1923, and is endemic to New Zealand. In 2025 this species was classified as "data deficient" under the New Zealand Threat Classification System.

== Description ==
The wingspan is 29–40 mm for males and 41–48 mm for females. The colour of the forewings varies, but is usually dark brown. Adults are on wing from September to February.

== Behaviour ==
They are attracted to light and have been collected via a mercury vapour light trap.

== Conservation status ==
In 2025 this species was classified by the New Zealand Department of Conservation as "data deficient" under the New Zealand Threat Classification System. This species is data poor as a result of the difficulty in identifying the species.
