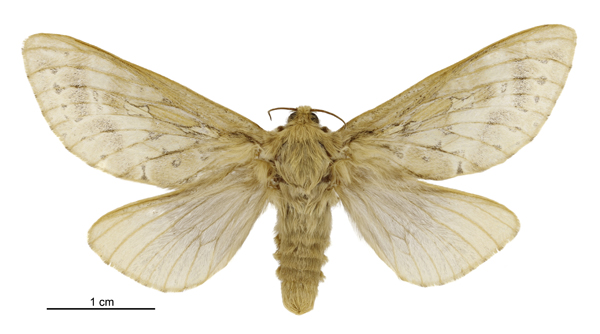
- Female specimen
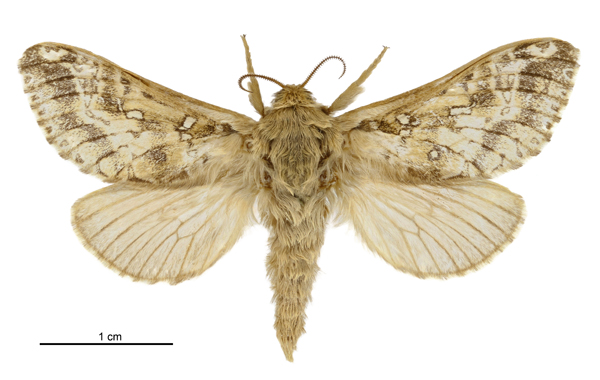
- Male specimen

Scientific classification
- Kingdom: Animalia
- Phylum: Arthropoda
- Clade: Pancrustacea
- Class: Insecta
- Order: Lepidoptera
- Family: Hepialidae
- Genus: Wiseana
- Species: W. jocosa

Binomial name
- Wiseana jocosa (Meyrick, 1912)

Synonyms
- Porina jocosa Meyrick, 1912

= Wiseana jocosa =

Species of moth

Wiseana jocosa is a species of moth belonging to the family Hepialidae. It was described by Edward Meyrick in 1912 and is endemic to New Zealand. In 2025 this species was classified as "data deficient" under the New Zealand Threat Classification System.

== Description ==
The wingspan is 34–38 mm for males and 44–55 mm for females. The colour of the forewings is usually dark brown. Adults are on wing from October to January.

== Behaviour ==
They are attracted to light and have been collected via a mercury vapour light trap.

== Conservation status ==
In 2025 this species was classified by the New Zealand Department of Conservation as "data deficient" under the New Zealand Threat Classification System. This species is data poor as a result of the difficulty in identifying the species.
