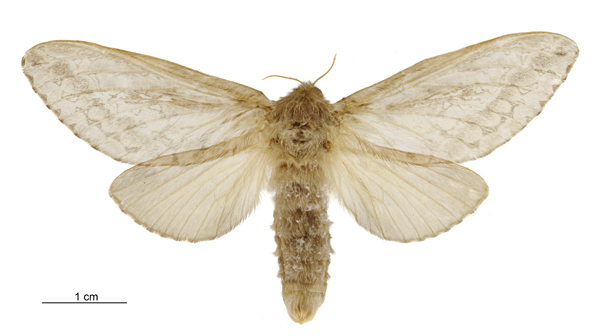
- Female specimen
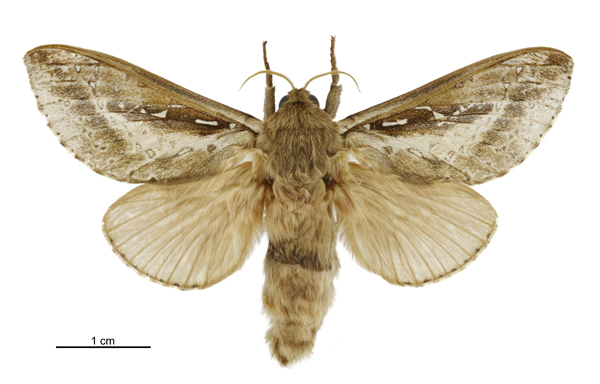
- Male specimen

Scientific classification
- Kingdom: Animalia
- Phylum: Arthropoda
- Class: Insecta
- Order: Lepidoptera
- Family: Hepialidae
- Genus: Wiseana
- Species: W. signata

Binomial name
- Wiseana signata (Walker, 1856)

Synonyms
- Elhamma signata Walker, 1856; Porina novaezealandiae Walker, 1856

= Wiseana signata =

Species of moth

Wiseana signata is a species of moth belonging to the family Hepialidae. It was described by Francis Walker in 1856 and is endemic to New Zealand.

The wingspan is 44–64 mm for males and 58–75 mm for females. Adults are on wing from October to May.

Food plants for the larvae include various species of grass.
