= Polyplectropus waitakerensis =

Scientific classification
- Kingdom: Animalia
- Phylum: Arthropoda
- Clade: Pancrustacea
- Class: Insecta
- Order: Trichoptera
- Family: Polycentropodidae
- Genus: Polyplectropus
- Species: P. waitakerensis

Binomial name
- Polyplectropus waitakerensis Wise, 1962

Species of caddisfly

Polyplectropus waitakerensis is a species of caddisfly belonging to the family Polycentropodidae. The species was first described by Keith Arthur John Wise in 1962, and is endemic to New Zealand.

== Taxonomy ==
The species was identified by Wise in 1962, based on a specimen collected by a light trap in Titirangi, Auckland, in 1952.

== Description ==
Wise's original text (the type description) reads as follows:

A species darker than P. puerilis McL. Anterior wings dark chocolate brown with creamy yellow markings. Length of anterior wing, ♂, 8–9 mm (0.31–0.35 in)., ♀, 9–11 mm (0.35–0.43 in), Genitalia, ♂ (fig. 3). Ninth segment membranous above, not produced in a dorsal plate. Two short inner processes of upper penis cover are widest at the obliquely truncate apex, in lateral view. Outer process with a broad lateral portion and with a long narrow spine arising above. Spine turned inward and downward near base with a bend before apex which is turned up almost horizontally. Penis from above with short apical slit forming two dorsal lobes, a single ventral lobe with rounded apex level with apices of dorsal lobes. Inferior appendage short, broad, obliquely truncate at apex, with strong dorsal concavity and definite dorsal apical angle. On upper surface, inner basal angle with two short darkened protuberances close together.

== Distribution and habitat ==
The species is endemic to New Zealand.
