= Zelandanura =

Scientific classification
- Domain: Eukaryota
- Kingdom: Animalia
- Phylum: Arthropoda
- Class: Collembola
- Order: Poduromorpha
- Family: Neanuridae
- Genus: Zelandanura; L.Deharveng & Wise, 1987
- Species: Z. bituberculata

Binomial name
- Zelandanura bituberculata L.Deharveng & Wise, 1987

Species of springtail

Zelandanura is a monotypic genus of springtail belonging to the family Neanuridae. The sole species found in this genus is Zelandanura bituberculata. Both the genus and species were first described by Louis Deharveng and Keith Arthur John Wise in 1987. Zelandanura is endemic to Campbell Island in the New Zealand Subantarctic Islands.

== Taxonomy ==
The genus and species were both identified by Louis Deharveng and Keith Arthur John Wise in 1987, with the holotypes discovered under timber in Tucker Cove by Wise in 1963. A new genus was chosen for the species due to the unique tubercle presentation. The name Zelandanura was chosen to describe the genus due to its presence in New Zealand and lack of a furca, while bituberculata was chosen to refer to the fusion of tubercles on each side of abdomen V, not typically seen in springtail species.

== Description ==
The species measures between 1.3–1.9 mm (0.051–0.075 in) in length.

== Distribution and habitat ==
Zelandanura is endemic to Campbell Island in the New Zealand Subantarctic Islands.
