= Cryptopygus terranovus =

Scientific classification
- Domain: Eukaryota
- Kingdom: Animalia
- Phylum: Arthropoda
- Class: Collembola
- Order: Entomobryomorpha
- Family: Isotomidae
- Genus: Cryptopygus
- Species: C. terranovus

Binomial name
- Cryptopygus terranovus (Wise, 1967)

Synonyms
- Cryptopygus-complex terranova M.Potapov, A.Babenko & A.Fjellberg, 2006; Gressittacantha terranova Wise, 1967

Species of springtail

Cryptopygus terranovus is a species of springtail belonging to the family Isotomidae. The species was first described by Keith Arthur John Wise in 1967, and is found on Antarctica.

== Taxonomy ==
The species was identified in 1967 by Wise, who described the species as Gressittacantha terranova. He chose to create a new genus, Gressittacantha, instead of placing the species within Cryptopygus, due to the presence of spines on the species. He named the genus after Judson Linsley Gressitt of the Bishop Museum. In 2015, the genera Gressittacantha and Neocryptopygus were synonymised with Cryptopygus, due to phylogenetic analysis showing both as occurring within the Cryptopygus clade without significant morphological differences. This led to a new name for the species, Cryptopygus terranovus.

The species can be split into three genetic groups: north, central and south. Cryptopygus terranovus has high levels of genetic variability; up to five times more variability relative to other Antarctic springtail species, possibly suggesting that two evolutionary lineage of Cryptopygus were previously distinct but now have overlapping ranges. The different lineages of Cryptopygus terranovus split during the Miocene era, suggest that the species is a relict species that was able to survive the Last Glacial Maximum on Antarctica.

== Description ==
The species is deep blue to black in colour, with a body length of up to 1.25 mm (0.049 in).

== Properties ==
Novel antifreeze proteins have been identified from specimens of Cryptopygus terranovus.

== Distribution and habitat ==
The species is found in the northern foothills of Victoria Land, between Football Saddle and Tripp Island. The holotype of the species was discovered in Terra Nova Bay, southern Victoria Land, Antarctica. The species is typically found in vegetated areas under stones.
