= Foveacheles =

Scientific classification
- Domain: Eukaryota
- Kingdom: Animalia
- Phylum: Arthropoda
- Subphylum: Chelicerata
- Class: Arachnida
- Order: Trombidiformes
- Family: Rhagidiidae
- Genus: Foveacheles; Zacharda, 1980

Synonyms
- Rhagidia Thorrel; Scyphiodes Berlese, 1886

Genus of mites

Foveacheles is a genus of mites belonging to the family Rhagidiidae.

The genus has cosmopolitan distribution.

Species:

- Foveacheles alpina Zacharda, 1980
- Foveacheles arenaria (Willmann, 1952)
- Foveacheles brevichelae Zacharda, 1980
- Foveacheles canestrinii (Berlese & Trouessart, 1889)
- Foveacheles cannadasi Barranco & Amate, 2000
- Foveacheles causasica Zacharda, 1983
- Foveacheles cegetensis Zacharda, 1983
- Foveacheles clavicrinita (Ehrnsberger, 1977)
- Foveacheles gigantea Zacharda, 2000-01
- Foveacheles halltalensis Zacharda, 2000-01
- Foveacheles halophila (Laboulbène, 1851)
- Foveacheles harzensis Zacharda, 1980
- Foveacheles magna Zacharda, 1980
- Foveacheles mira Zacharda, 1980
- Foveacheles osloensis (Thor, 1934)
- Foveacheles paralleloseta Zacharda, 1985
- Foveacheles proxima Zacharda, 2000-01
- Foveacheles rupestris Zacharda, 1980
- Foveacheles simulata Zacharda, 2000
- Foveacheles terricola (Koch, 1835)
- Foveacheles troglodyta Zacharda, 1988
- Foveacheles unguiculata Zacharda, 1994
- Foveacheles willmanni Zacharda, 1980
