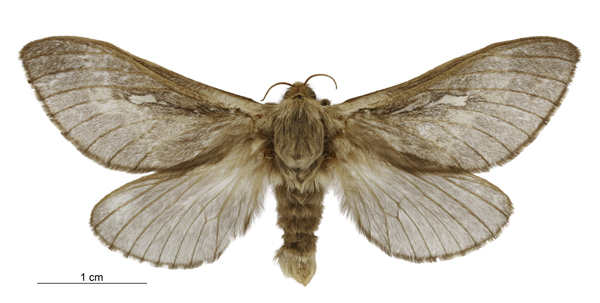
- Female specimen
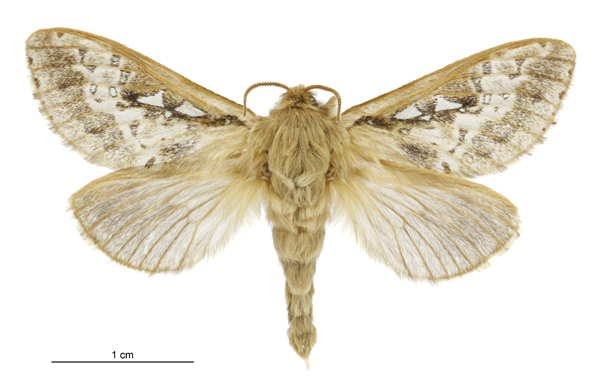
- Male specimen

Scientific classification
- Kingdom: Animalia
- Phylum: Arthropoda
- Clade: Pancrustacea
- Class: Insecta
- Order: Lepidoptera
- Family: Hepialidae
- Genus: Wiseana
- Species: W. copularis

Binomial name
- Wiseana copularis (Meyrick, 1912)

Synonyms
- Porina copularis Meyrick, 1912

= Wiseana copularis =

Species of moth endemic to New Zealand

Wiseana copularis is a species of moth belonging to the family Hepialidae. It was first described by Edward Meyrick in 1912. It is endemic to New Zealand. This moth is one of several very similar looking species within the genus Wiseana and this group are collectively referred to as "Porina" moths. In its larvae form this species consumes pasture grasses and, if numerous, is regarded as a pest by New Zealand farmers reliant on good quality pasture for their stock.

== Taxonomy ==
W. copularis was first described by Edward Meyrick in 1912 and originally named Porina copularis. Meyrick used material collected by Alfred Philpott from the West Plains district of Invercargill. George Hudson discussed and illustrated this species under this name in his 1928 publication The Butterflies and Moths of New Zealand. Pierre Viette placed this species within the genus Wiseana in 1961. The lectotype specimen is held at the Natural History Museum, London.

John S. Dugdale noted that the name despecta was misapplied by L. J. Dumbleton to this species in his 1966 publication Genitalia, classification and zoogeography of the New Zealand Hepialidae (Lepidoptera). This error was perpetuated in subsequent agricultural literature.

== Description ==
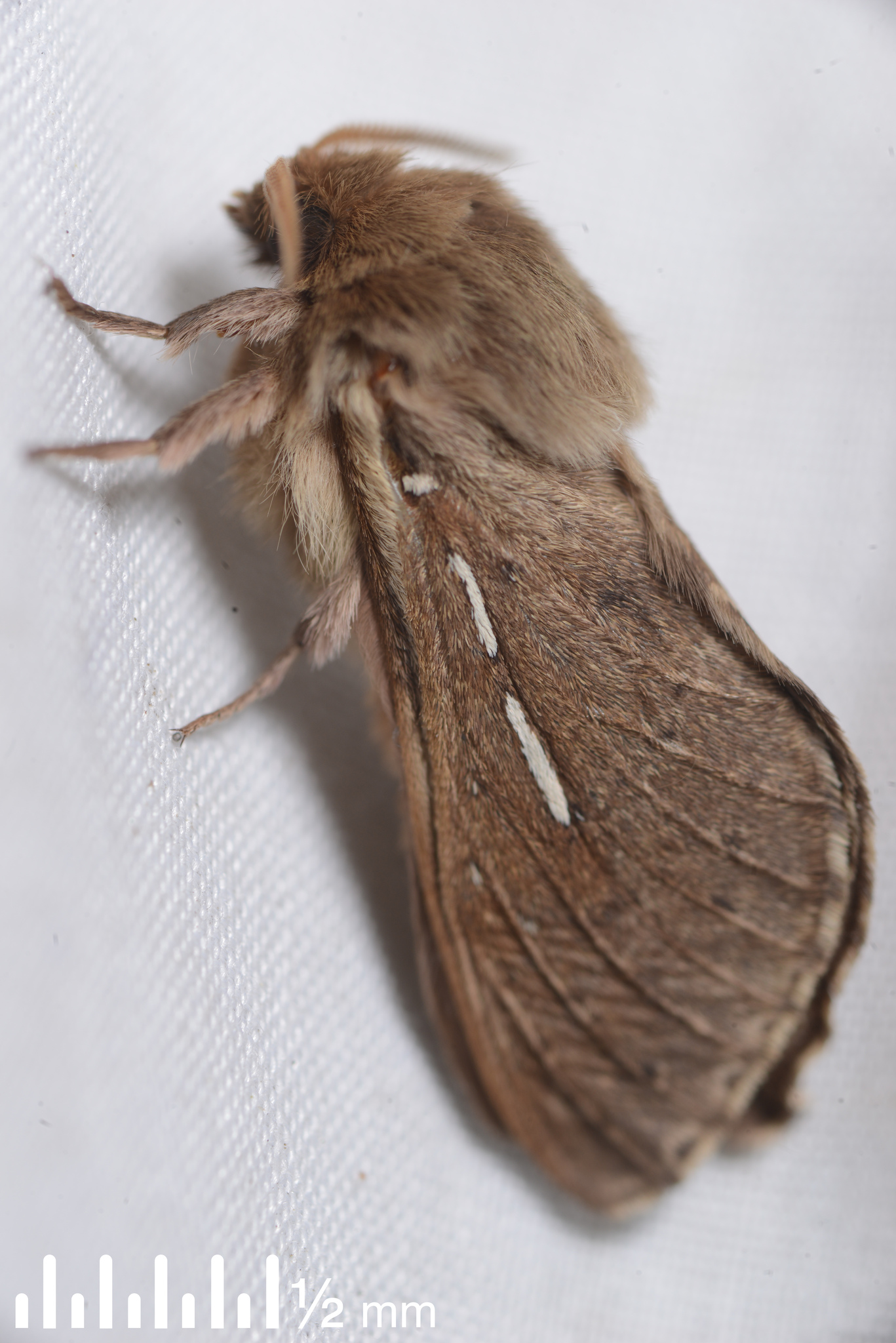
Live W. copularis.

The wingspan is 34–40 mm for males and 43–52 mm for females. The colour of the forewings varies from dark to pale brown. The hindwings are pallid to infuscate. W. copularis has variable wing patternation and is visually very similar to four other species within the genus Wiseana. It is possible to distinguish the male of W. copularis by the long rectangular antennal pectinations of the adult moth. However the recommended technique to distinguish specimens down to species level is through microscopic examination of the genitalia of the species or alternatively mitochondrial DNA analysis.

== Distribution ==
This species is endemic to New Zealand. It is common in the Wairarapa and Wellington districts as well as throughout the South Island.

== Biology and behaviour ==
W. copularis is on the wing from October to April. They take flight just before dusk onwards and are attracted to light. They only live for a few days. Female moths have been observed fanning their wings just prior to copulation with a male. Evidence suggests that the female moths release a sex pheromone to attract male moths prior to copulation. After mating females lay between 500 - 2300 eggs in grass. After 3 to 5 weeks the eggs hatch and the young larvae feed on leaf litter. As they mature, at an age of between 4 and 15 weeks old, the larvae create a vertical tunnel in the soil from which they emerge at night to eat grass species surrounding their tunnel. The tunnel entrance is concealed by silk and plant detritus. At approximately 38 weeks they reach maturity having grown to a length of up to 7 cm. The moth then enters the pupa stage of their life cycle which lasts approximately a month. The moth pupates in their tunnel.

Field collected larvae of this species have been successfully reared in the laboratory for research purposes. During that study it was found that the survival to adulthood of the larvae was greatest at a temperature of 15 Celsius. Eggs and immature larvae are vulnerable to dry weather and trampling by stock. Once in their tunnel, they are relatively protected from dry conditions. Larvae have also been shown to be at risk from bacterial infection. Research has been undertaken on the possibility of exploiting this susceptibility to ensure biological control of larvae inhabiting farmland pasture.

== Habitat and host species ==
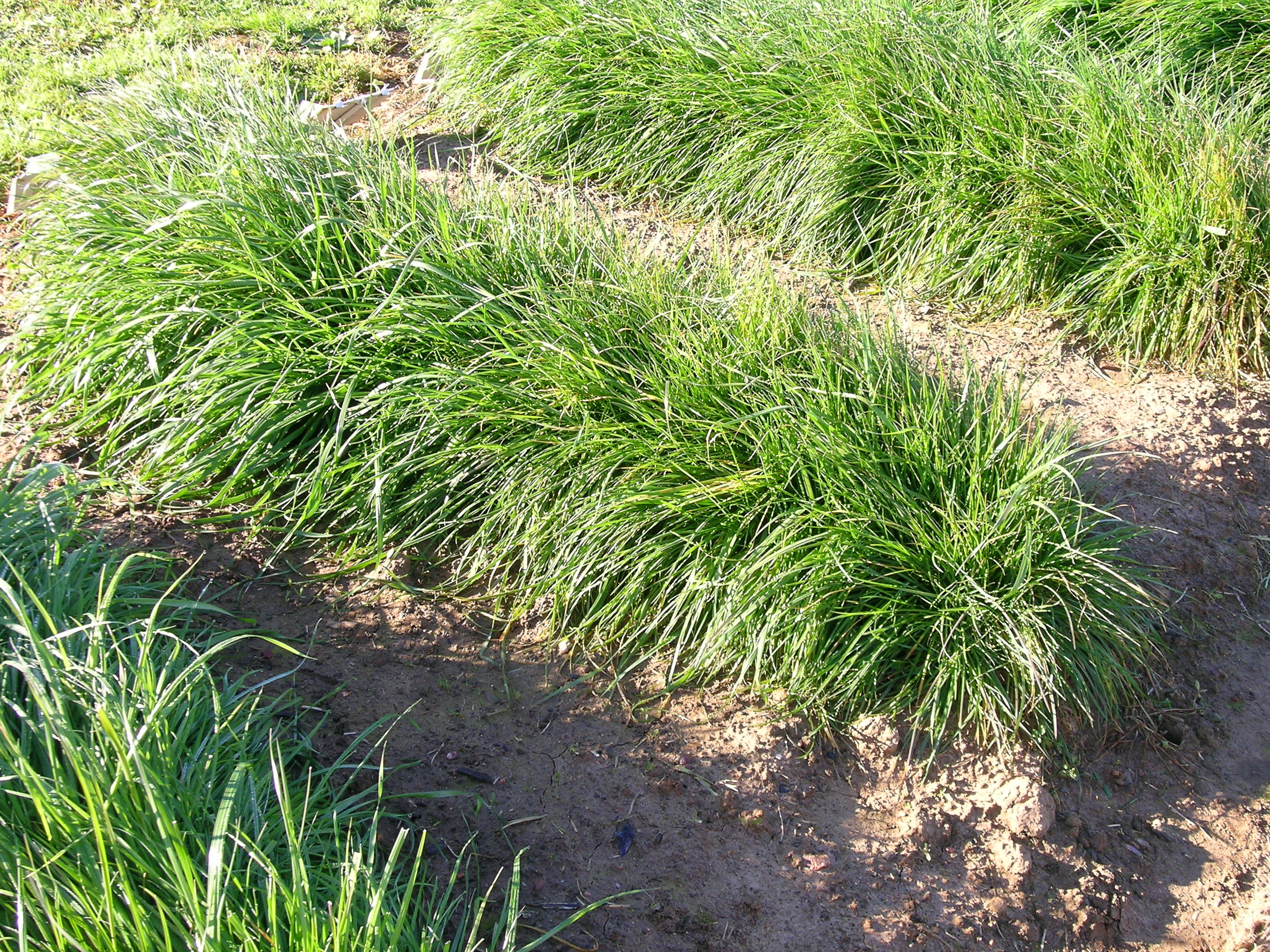
A host plant for W. copularis - Lolium perenne

W. copularis prefer moist sites in shrub and grasslands. Host species for the moth larvae include Lolium perenne and Trifolium repens.

== Interaction with humans ==
The larvae of this species have been implicated in pasture damage. Farmers use an insect growth regulator such as Diflubenzuron where they believe moth larvae infestation may cause significant damage to their pasture. The interactions of this species with the Māori food crop kūmara has also been investigated, indicating that this species may have fed on kūmara in traditional kūmara gardens.
