= Keith Wise =

New Zealand entomologist (1926–2012)

- Wise at the Entomology Department of Auckland War Memorial Museum in 1986
- Born: Keith Arthur John Wise; 1 June 1926; Wellington, New Zealand
- Died: 31 March 2012 (aged 85)
- Education: Whangarei Boys' High School; Southland Boys' High School; Waitaki Boys' High School
- Scientific career
- Fields: Entomology
- Workplaces: Department of Scientific and Industrial Research; Bishop Museum; Auckland War Memorial Museum

Keith Arthur John Wise (1 June 1926 – 31 March 2012), often referred to as K. A. J. Wise, was a New Zealand entomologist. Originally employed at the Department of Scientific and Industrial Research, Wise began working with the Bishop Museum in the early 1960s, coordinating field programmes for United States visits to Antarctica and Subantarctic islands. This work led Wise to identify and describe large numbers of novel species, including many species of springtail. In 1965, Wise became the first Curator of Entomology at the Auckland War Memorial Museum, where he was integral in creating the first entomology section within the natural history gallery.

== Early life ==
Wise was born on 1 June 1926 in Wellington. As his father Victor John Wise worked in insurance, Wise moved around the country often, living in Whangārei, Invercargill and Oamaru, attending Whangarei Boys' High School, Southland Boys' High School and Waitaki Boys' High School. While living in Invercargill, Wise joined the Jellicoe Sea Scouts, which was led by Geoffrey Orbell, who would later be known for rediscovering the takahē in 1948. Orbell often took the boys sailing on his yacht to Foveaux Strait, which led to Wise developing a passion for both sailing and nature.

In 1945, Wise joined the Royal New Zealand Air Force for eight months, completing a course in meteorology. After the end of World War II, Wise began working at a fire insurance office in Invercargill due to the advice of his father. He later transferring to the Auckland office, but was unsatisfied, feeling that insurance was not a good fit for him.

== Career ==
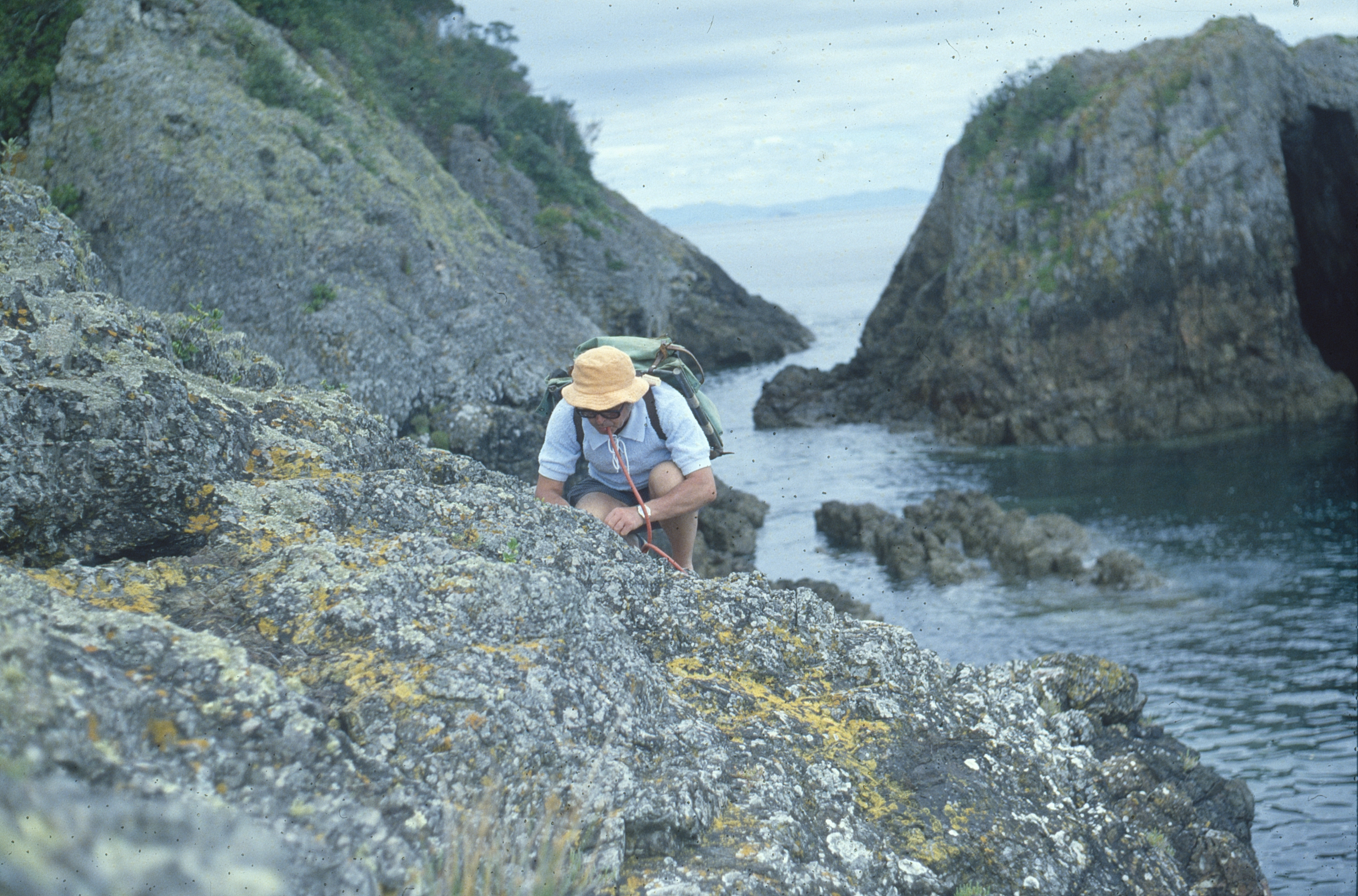
Wise collecting during the Dec 1979 Noises Island field trip.

In 1945, Wise joined the Auckland Shell Club, and the following year malacologist Baden Powell gave a recommendation to the Auckland Museum Institute for Wise to join. In 1948, Wise began working at the Department of Scientific and Industrial Research in Mount Albert, working as an entomology technician in the Plant Diseases Division of DSIR under entomologist Don Spiller. Originally a temporary job looking at the effects of borer beetles, Wise was permanently employed by DSIR in early 1949.

From February 1954, Wise began working as an associate entomologist at Auckland War Memorial Museum, after being invited by museum entomologist Graham Turbott to provide cover while he was an eight months of leave. Wise worked this job concurrently with his work as DSIR, working weekends and evenings. Wise became an Associate Entomologist in 1957 while still employed at DSIR, when Turbott resigned to become the Director of the Canterbury Museum.

In late 1960, Wise took leave from the DSIR to work with the Bishop Museum, performing field research in Antarctica over the 1960–1961 Antarctic summer. In October 1961 he resigned from the DSIR and the Auckland War Memorial Museum in order to take up a full-time position at the Bishop Museum, coordinating field programmes from Christchurch for the United States Antarctic Research Programme. Wise took part in numerous trips to Antarctica and the sub-Antarctic islands such as the Auckland Islands and Campbell Island, primarily focusing on springtails, and spend time operating a long-range high altitude trap for insects on United States Navy aircraft across the Pacific Ocean.

In 1965, Wise was appointed the first Curator of Entomology at the Auckland War Memorial Museum. He opened up the entomology department to visitors in order to inspire the public to collect insects, and led the development and opening of the insect section of the natural history gallery of Auckland War Memorial Museum, which opened in 1969.

Wise carried out 15 field trips in 1966 and 1967, including a visit to Whakaari / White Island in December 1966, and an expedition to the Auckland Islands. Wise's visit to Whakaari / White Island led to him creating a systemic list of all known species present on the island. In 1969, Wise took part in the Cook Bicentenary Expedition, focusing on the biodiversity of Rarotonga, Tonga and the Cook Islands. Wise was a part of the Royal Society of New Zealand South Pacific Expedition in 1977, which documented the biodiversity of the Lau Islands of Fiji.

From 1972 to 1990, Wise was the third most senior staff member at the museum, leading him to be the acting assistant director on many occasions. From 1969 to 1990, Wise was heavily involved with museum-related publications, including the Records of the Auckland Institute & Museum, the Bulletin of the Auckland Institute and Museum and the museum's annual review. Wise published extensively on entomology-related topics, including works on caddis flies, lacewings, tiger beetles and monarch butterflies. In 1987 Wise co-edited a third edition of Powell's Native Animals of New Zealand, alongside Brian Gill, Walter Cernohorsky and Brett Stephenson.

Wise retired in 1990 as a museum curator, but continued to work as a research associate of the museum. Wise died in 2012, while working on a monograph documenting the lacewings and alder flies of New Zealand.

== Recognition and legacy ==
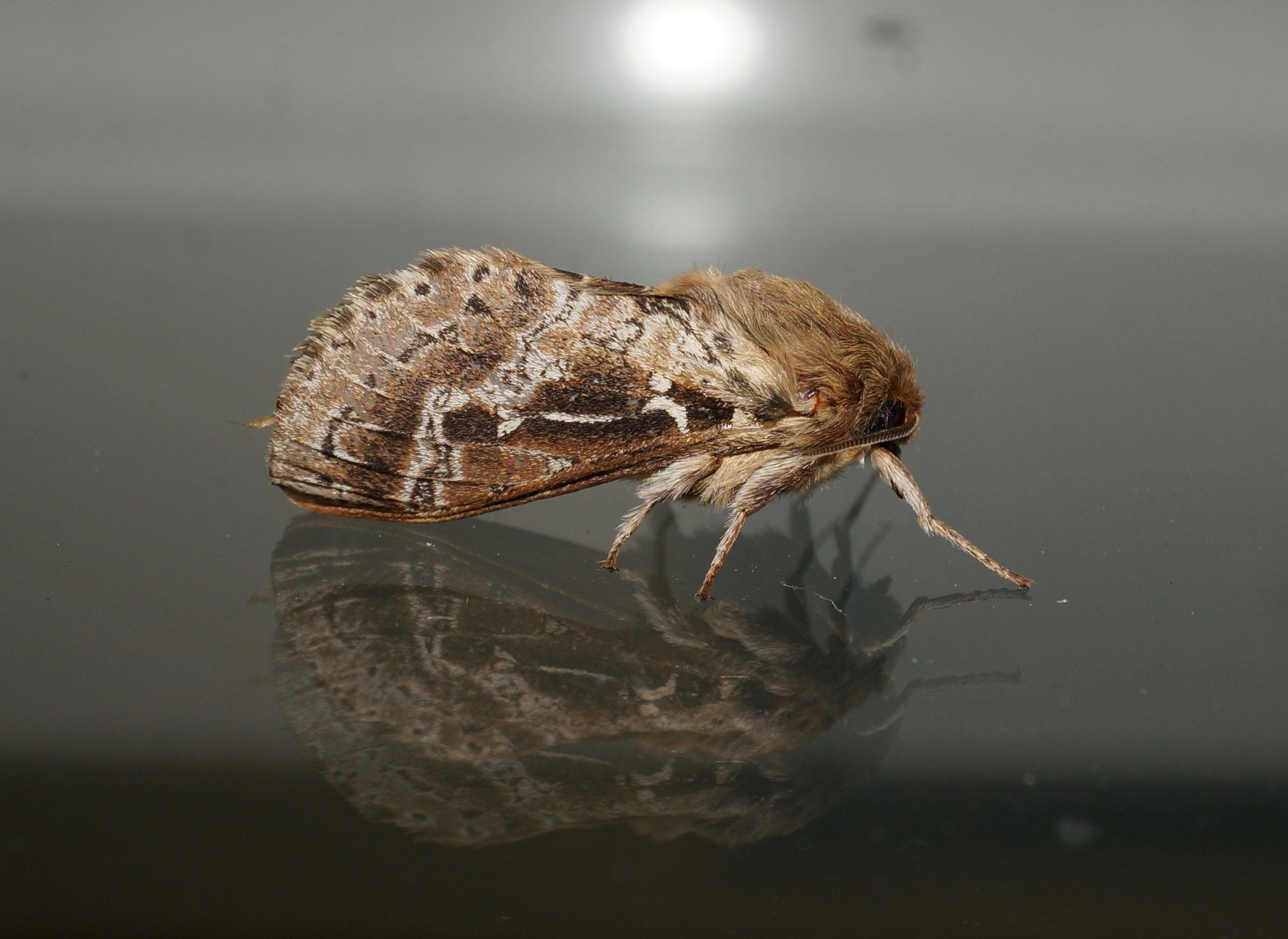
Numerous species have been named after Wise, including the ghost moth genus Wiseana (pictured: Wiseana cervinata)

Wise became an Associate Emeritus of the Auckland War Memorial Museum in 1999, which recognised his commitment to scientific research and scholarship. Wise was also elected as a Fellow of the Royal Entomological Society of London.

Wise Peak in Antarctica was named after Wise. Four taxa have been named in Wise's honour: the Antarctic prostig mites Coccorhagidia keithi and Eupodes wisei (the latter of which Wise discovered), the intertidal beetle Hyphalus wisei, and the endemic New Zealand moth genus Wiseana.

After his death, his son Martin Wise organised Antarctica 1961, a photography exhibition held at Point Chevalier which showcased 36 of Wise's photographs of Antarctica.

== Personal life ==
Wise married Rosemary Musgrave in 1951, with whom he had four children. Wise's wife and children would often help Wise collect insects, and assisted his work at the museum.

== Taxa identified by Wise ==
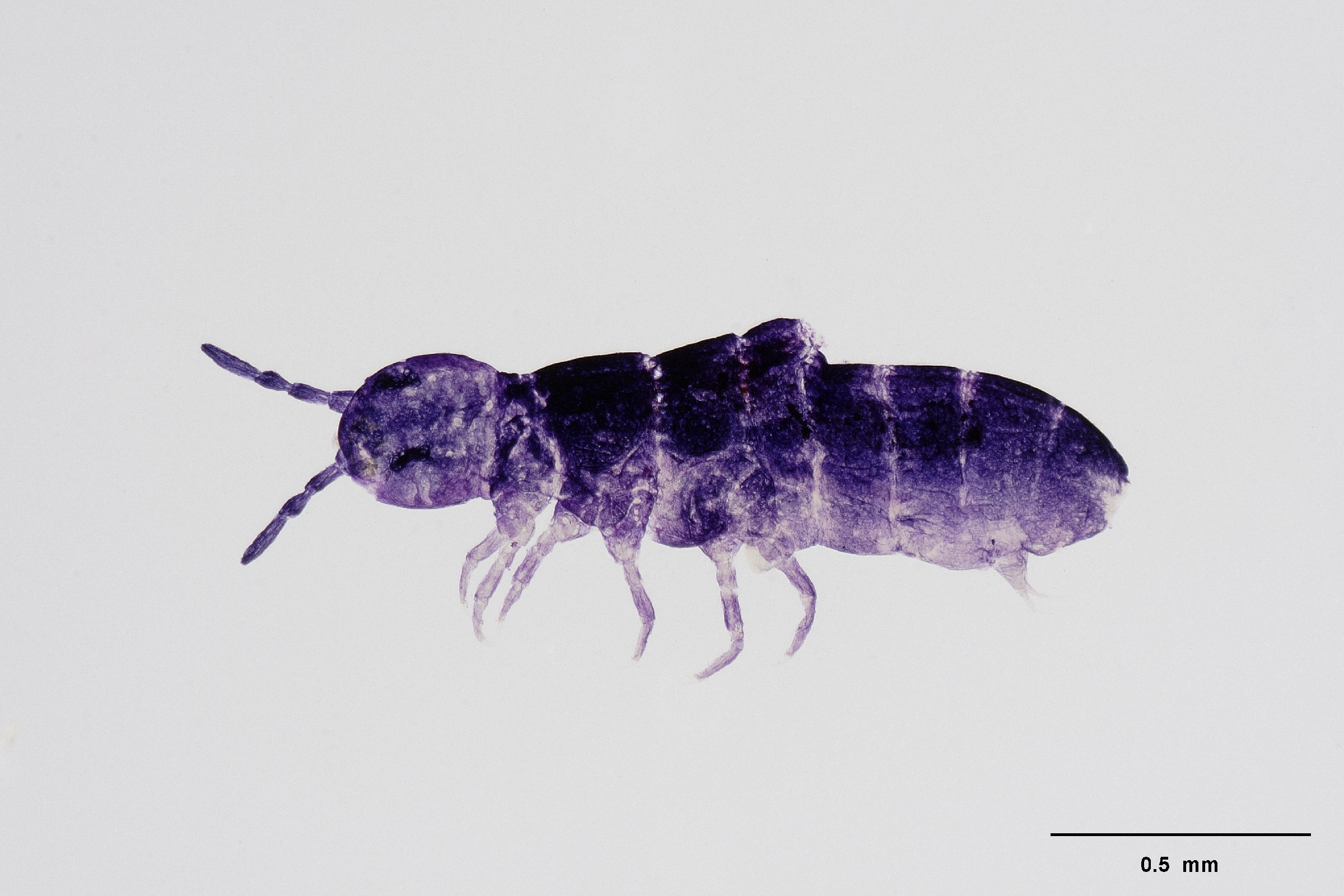
Cryptopygus campbellensis, a species of springtail from Campbell Island described by Wise in 1964

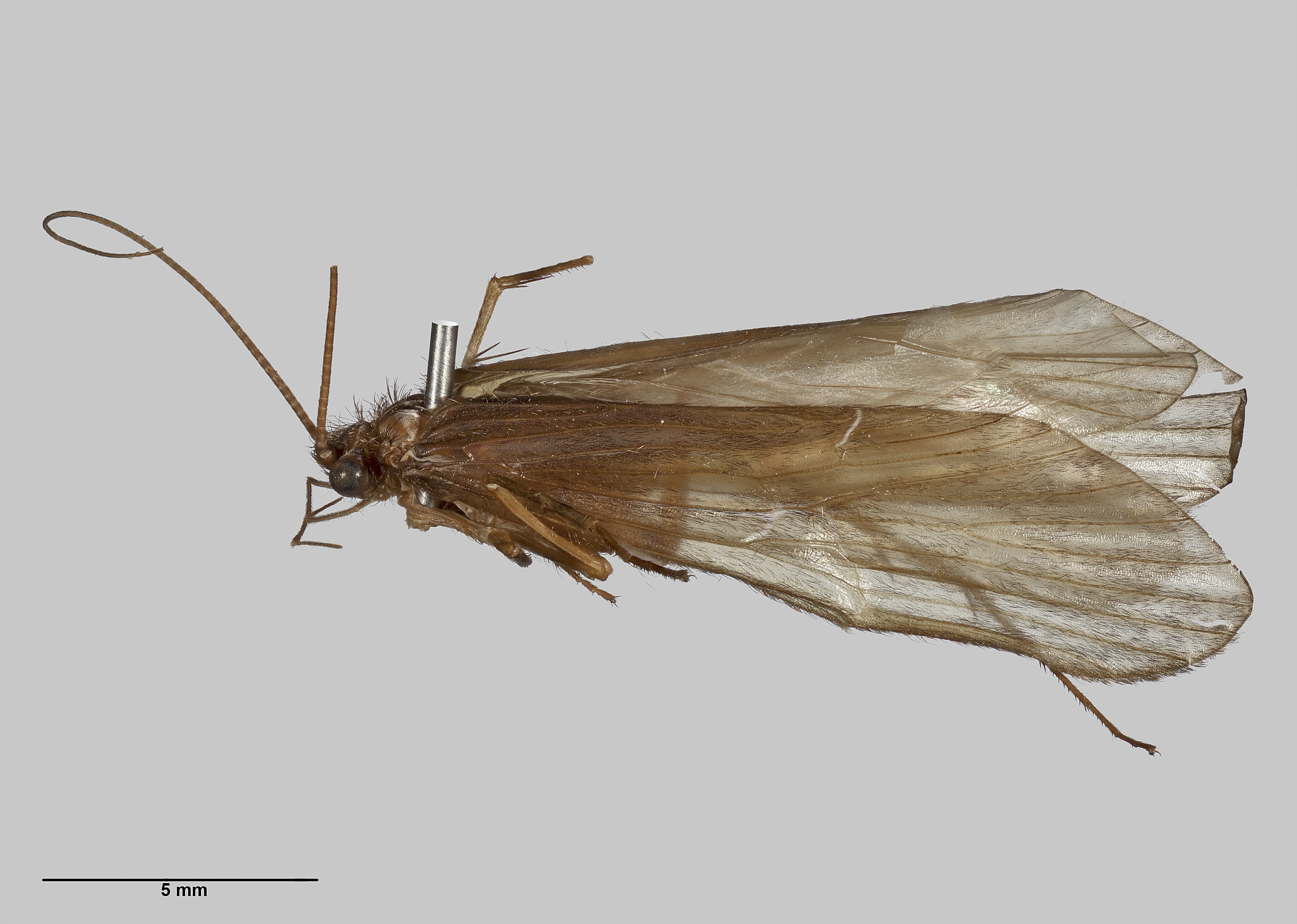
Edpercivalia harrisoni, a species of caddisfly described by Wise in 1982

- Acanthomurus rivalis Wise, 1964
- Alloecentrella Wise, 1958
- Alloecentrella magnicornis Wise, 1958
- Confluens Wise, 1962
- Costachorema notopterum Wise, 1972
- Cryptopygus campbellensis Wise, 1964
- Cryptopygus cisantarcticus Wise, 1967
- Cryptopygus terranovus (Wise, 1967) (originally Gressittacantha terranova)
- Diplectrona bulla Wise, 1958
- Ecnomina zealandica Wise, 1958
- Edpercivalia harrisoni Wise, 1982
- Friesea litoralis (Wise, 1964) (originally Colonavis litoralis)
- Friesea tilbrooki Wise, 1970
- Hydrobiosis falcis Wise, 1958
- Neobiosella Wise, 1958
- Neobiosella irrorata Wise, 1958
- Oeconesus lobatus Wise, 1958
- Olinga fumosa Wise, 1958
- Orthopsyche thomasi (Wise, 1962) (originally Hydropsyche thomasi)
- Oxyethira ahipara Wise, 1998
- Oxyethira waipoua Wise, 1998
- Parakatianna salmoni (Wise, 1964) (originally Longkingia salmoni)
- Polyplectropus impluvii Wise, 1962
- Polyplectropus waitakerensis Wise, 1962
- Porphyrosela hardenbergiella (Wise, 1957) (originally Lithocolletis hardenbergiella)
- Pseudoeconesus bistirpis Wise, 1958
- Pseudosorensia atlantica (Wise, 1970) (originally Sorensia atlantica, later Isotoma (Pseudosorensia) atlantica)
- Psilochorema embersoni Wise, 1982
- Pycnocentrodes aeris Wise, 1958
- Tiphobiosis kuscheli Wise, 1972
- Tullbergia mediantarctica Wise, 1967
- Tullbergia templei Wise, 1970
- Zelandanura L.Deharveng & Wise, 1987
- Zelandanura bituberculata L.Deharveng & Wise, 1987

== Selected bibliography ==
- Wise, K. A. J. (1958). "Trichoptera of New Zealand: I. A Catalogue of the Auckland Museum Collections with Descriptions of New Genera and New Species". Records of the Auckland Institute and Museum. 5: 49–63. ISSN 0067-0464. JSTOR 42906091. OCLC 9987167351. Wikidata Q58676764.
- Wise, K. A. J.; Gressitt, J. L. (July 1965). "Far Southern Animals and Plants". Nature. 207 (4992): 101–102. doi:10.1038/207101a0. ISSN 1476-4687. OCLC 8545102380. Wikidata Q74211747.
- Wise, K. A. J. (1967). "Collembola (Springtails)". Entomology of Antarctica. Antarctic Research Series. Vol. 10. pp. 123–148. doi:10.1029/AR010P0123. ISBN 978-1-118-66869-6.
- Wise, K. A. J. (January 1973). "New records in the New Zealand Neuroptera: Hemerobiidae". New Zealand Entomologist. 5 (2): 181–185. doi:10.1080/00779962.1973.9722997. ISSN 0077-9962. OCLC 4898013186. Wikidata Q54620489.
- Wise, K. A. J. (1973). "A List and Bibliography of the Aquatic and Water-Associated Insects of New Zealand". Records of the Auckland Institute and Museum. 10: 143–187. ISSN 0067-0464. JSTOR 42906197. OCLC 9987330692. Wikidata Q58676955.
- Wise, K. A. J. (1977). "A synonymic checklist of the Hexapoda of the New Zealand sub-region: the smaller orders". Bulletin of the Auckland Institute and Museum. 11: 1–176. ISSN 0067-0456. LCCN 79304159. OCLC 3927295. Wikidata Q115119989.
- Spiller, Donald M.; Wise, K. A. J.; Dale, P. S.; Maddison, P. A. (1982). A catalogue (1860–1960) of New Zealand insects and their host plants. Bulletin of the New Zealand Department of Scientific and Industrial Research. Vol. 231. Department of Scientific and Industrial Research. pp. 1–260. ISBN 0-477-06693-3. OCLC 630139302. Wikidata Q129261698.

== Bibliography ==
- Thwaites, Ian (2015). A Good Place to Be: Auckland Museum People 1929–89. Ian Thwaites. ISBN 978-0-473-32932-7. OCLC 927167353. Wikidata Q64995662.
