= Cryptopygus elegans =

Scientific classification
- Kingdom: Animalia
- Phylum: Arthropoda
- Class: Collembola
- Order: Entomobryomorpha
- Family: Isotomidae
- Genus: Cryptopygus
- Species: C. elegans

Binomial name
- Cryptopygus elegans (Cardoso, 1973) or (Rapoport & Izarra, 1962)

Synonyms
- Cryptopygus elegans (Cardoso, 1973); Cryptopygus elegans (Rapoport & Izarra, 1962)

Species of springtail

Cryptopygus elegans is a species of springtails found in Argentina.
