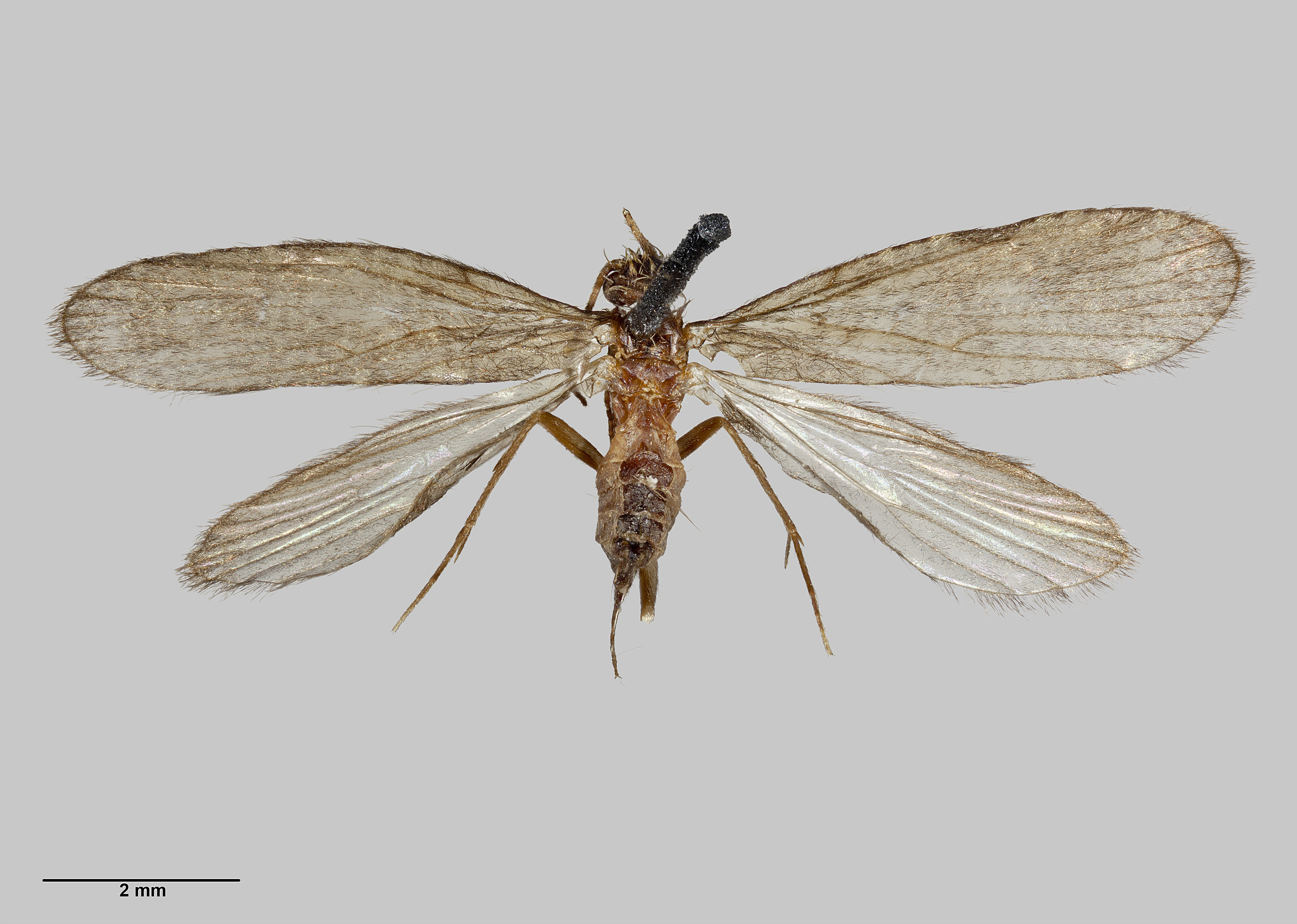
- Female holotype held at the Auckland War Memorial Museum

Conservation status
- Nationally Endangered (NZ TCS)

Scientific classification
- Kingdom: Animalia
- Phylum: Arthropoda
- Clade: Pancrustacea
- Class: Insecta
- Order: Trichoptera
- Family: Philopotamidae
- Genus: Neobiosella; Wise, 1958
- Species: N. irrorata

Binomial name
- Neobiosella irrorata Wise, 1958

= Neobiosella =

Species of caddisfly

Neobiosella is a monotypic genus of caddisfly belonging to the family Philopotamidae. The sole species found in this genus is Neobiosella irrorata. Both the genus and species were first described by Keith Arthur John Wise in 1958. Neobiosella is endemic to New Zealand.

== Taxonomy ==
The genus and species were both identified by Wise in 1958. Wise felt that a novel genus was appropriate for N. irrorata due to the absence of apical fork 1 in both wings being a characteristic not shared with any other species in the family Philopotamidae.

== Description ==
Wise's original text (the type description) reads as follows:

ANTERIOR WING short, broad, and well-rounded at apex. Apical forks 2, 3, 4, and 5 present. Discoidal cell present. Additional costal cross-vein and additional basal cross-vein between Sc and R present. POSTERIOR WING narrower than anterior wing. Apical forks 2, 3, and 5 present. Discoidal cell present...HEAD fuscous; ANTENNAE testaceous, each segment annulated with fuscous basally. THORAX fuscous: LEGS testaceous. ANTERIOR WING light testaceous strongly irrorated with fuscous. Length of anterior wing, 6 mm (0.24 in).

== Distribution and habitat ==
The species is endemic to New Zealand, having been found in eastern Northland Region and the Auckland Region.
