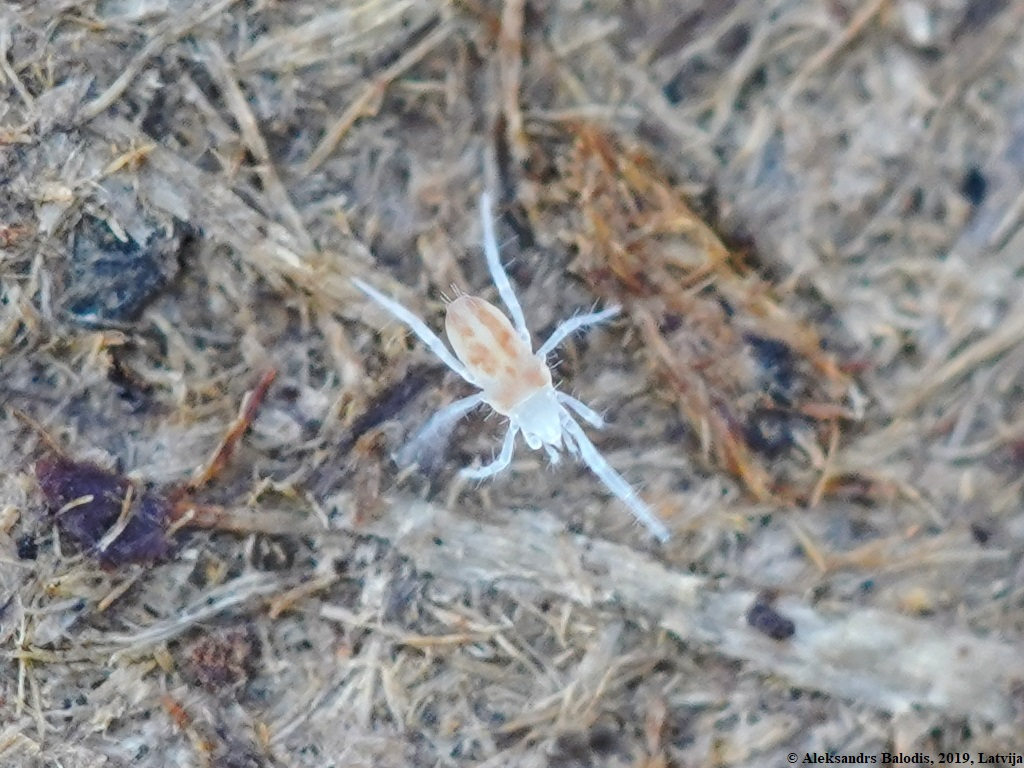

Scientific classification
- Kingdom: Animalia
- Phylum: Arthropoda
- Subphylum: Chelicerata
- Class: Arachnida
- Order: Trombidiformes
- Suborder: Prostigmata
- Family: Rhagidiidae; Oudemans, 1922

Type genus
- Rhagidia Thorell, 1872

Genera
- See Text

= Rhagidiidae =

Rhagidiidae Temporal range: Palaeogene–present

Family of predatory soil mites

Rhagidiidae is a family of soft-bodied, predaceous soil mites in the order Trombidiformes. It currently comprises 28 genera and approximately 150 species of whitish mites that inhabit soil environments, often found in caves and other subterranean habitats.

== Taxonomy and Systematics ==
The family Rhagidiidae was established by Oudemans in 1922. The genus Rhagidia was first described by Thorell in 1872, and shortly after, Cambridge (1876) described Poecilophysis from the distant Kerguelen Island. Early taxonomic work was conducted by several researchers including C.L. Koch, Canestrini, Thorell, Berlese, Banks, and others throughout the late 19th and early 20th centuries.

The first comprehensive review of the family by Thor & Willmann (1941) recognized three genera, 37 certain species, 8 uncertain species, and five "varieties." Modern systematic understanding of the family was achieved through the world revision by Zacharda (1980), which established the current system comprising 20 genera (16 described as new) and 74 species (35 described as new).

Since 1980, several new genera have been described including Krantzia (now Zachardaia), Neothoria, Lindquistula, Kouchibouguacia, Arhagidia, Dongnaia, Janes, and Paracrassocheles. As of September 2021, the family contains 28 genera and 150 species.

== Genera ==
Rhagidiidae genera according to current classification:

- Arctorhagidia Zacharda, 1980 – 2 species
- Arhagidia Lindquist & Zacharda, 1987 – 1 species
- Brevipalpia Zacharda, 1980 – 1 species
- Coccorhagidia Thor, 1934 – 8 species
- Crassocheles Zacharda, 1980 – 2 species
- Elliotta Zacharda, 1980 – 1 species
- Eskimaia Zacharda, 1980 – 1 species
- Evadorhagidia Zacharda, 1980 – 4 species
- Flabellorhagidia Elliott, 1976 – 1 species
- Foveacheles Zacharda, 1980 – 33 species
- Hammenia Zacharda, 1980 – 1 species
- Janes Jesionowska, 2002 – 1 species
- Kouchibouguacia Zacharda, 1986 – 2 species
- Latoempodia Zacharda, 1980 – 2 species
- Lindquistula Zacharda, 1986 – 1 species
- Neothoria Abou-Awad & El-Bagoury, 1986 – 2 species
- Paracrassocheles Khaustov, 2015 – 1 species
- Parallelorhagidia Zacharda, 1980 – 3 species
- Poecilophysis Cambridge, 1876 – 16 species
- Rhagidia Thorell, 1872 – 28 species
- Robustocheles Zacharda, 1980 – 19 species
- Shibaia Zacharda, 1980 – 6 species
- Thoria Zacharda, 1980 – 2 species
- Traegaardhia Zacharda, 1980 – 10 species
- Troglocheles Zacharda, 1980 – 10 species
- Tuberostoma Zacharda, 1980 – 3 species
- Zachardaia Özdikmen, 2008 – 1 species
