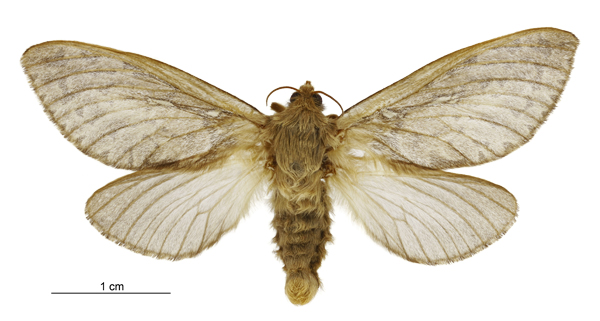
- Female specimen
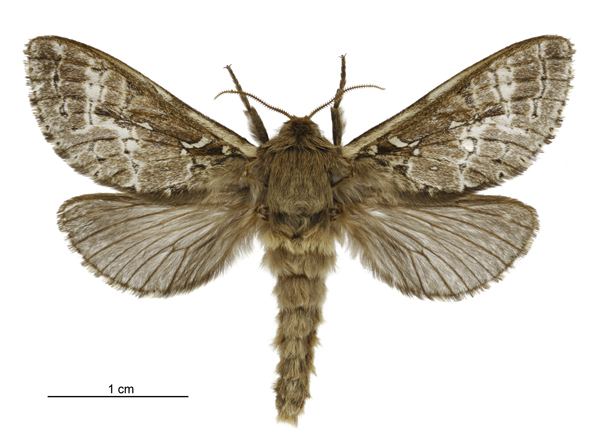
- Male specimen

Scientific classification
- Kingdom: Animalia
- Phylum: Arthropoda
- Class: Insecta
- Order: Lepidoptera
- Family: Hepialidae
- Genus: Wiseana
- Species: W. cervinata

Binomial name
- Wiseana cervinata (Walker, 1865)

Synonyms
- Elhamma cervinata Walker, 1865; Hepialus despectus Walker, 1865; Porina vexata Walker, 1865; Pielus variolaris Guenee, 1868

= Wiseana cervinata =

Species of moth

Wiseana cervinata, a porina moth, is a species of moth belonging to the family Hepialidae. It was described by Francis Walker in 1865 and is endemic to New Zealand.

The wingspan is 34–38 mm for males and 44–55 mm for females. Adults are on wing from September to March.

The larvae feed on Trifolium species and various grasses. The interactions of this species with the Māori food crop kūmara has also been investigated, indicating that this species may have fed on kūmara in traditional kūmara gardens.
