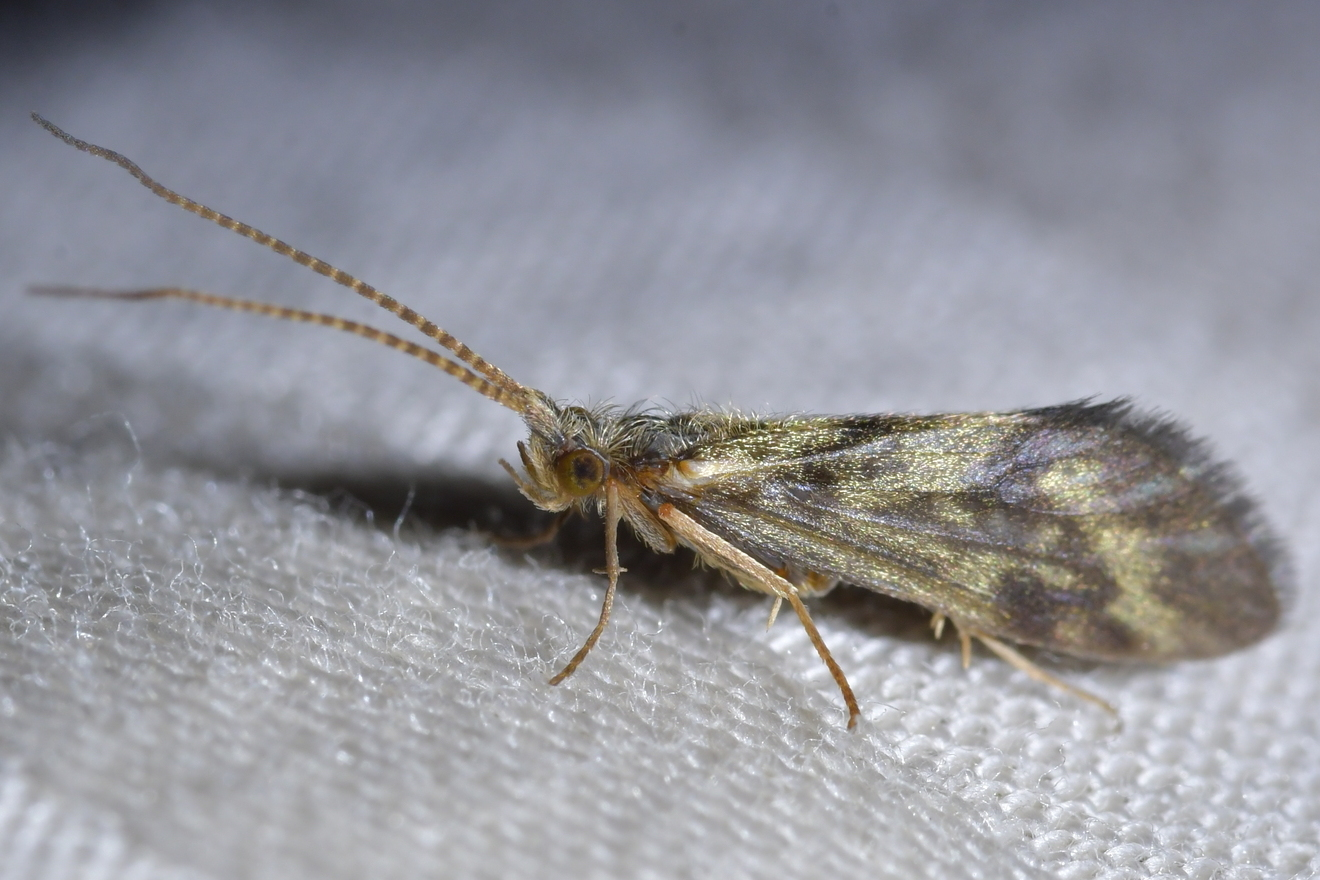
- Pycnocentrodes aureolus

Scientific classification
- Kingdom: Animalia
- Phylum: Arthropoda
- Clade: Pancrustacea
- Class: Insecta
- Order: Trichoptera
- Family: Conoesucidae
- Genus: Pycnocentrodes; Tillyard, 1924

Species
- See text

= Pycnocentrodes =

Genus of insects

Pycnocentrodes is a genus of caddisflies belonging to the family Conoesucidae. The genus was first recognised by Robert John Tillyard in 1924. All known species of Pycnocentrodes are endemic to New Zealand.

== Taxonomy ==
The genus was first identified by Robert John Tillyard in 1924, who identified Pycnocentrodes chiltoni as the type species. In 1962, K. A. J. Wise recombined two of the original species identified by Tillyard, P. hamiltoni and P. olingoides, into a new genus called Confluens.

Reviewing the genus in 1970, Wise noted that it was likely that there was either a highly morphologically variable species or a species complex within Pycnocentrodes, due to wide-ranging variations in size, wing colour and pattern and genitalia. In 1976, Donald R. Cowley synonymised P. chiltoni (the former type species of the genus) and P. unicolor Wise, 1958 with P. aureolus.

Genetic analysis places Pycnocentrodes within a clade of New Zealand endemic caddiesflies who all share a common ancestor: Pycnocentrodes, Periwinkla, Confluens and Beraeoptera.

== Description ==
Tillyard's original text (the type description) reads as follows:

Allied to Pycnocentria McL, from which it differs by the absence of the web fold in forewings of male, and the consequent normal structure of the radial sector in both sexes. The radial cell is present, and is of a somewhat narrowed, elongate form, basal portion being particularly narrowed. In some cases the stem of R_{2+3} may be weakened or obsolescent, so that the radial cell is incomplete above (as in P. olingoides n. sp.), but venation is always very distinct from that of Pycnocentria, where all the branches of Rs, M, and Cu_{1}, come off direct from longitudinal fold. Stem of R_{2+3} in hindwing of male also weakened or obsolete, leaving radial cell open above. Apical forks of forewing all present, as in Pycnocentria; in hindwing, only 1, 2 and 5 present, as also in Pycnocentria. No longitudinal fold in hindwing of male. Tibial spurs 2, 2, 4. Maxillary palpi of male short and hairy, not projecting beyond end of first antennal segment.

== Distribution ==
The genus is found in New Zealand.

== Species ==
- Pycnocentrodes aeris Wise, 1958
- Pycnocentrodes aureolus (McLachlan, 1868)
- Pycnocentrodes modestus Cowley, 1976
