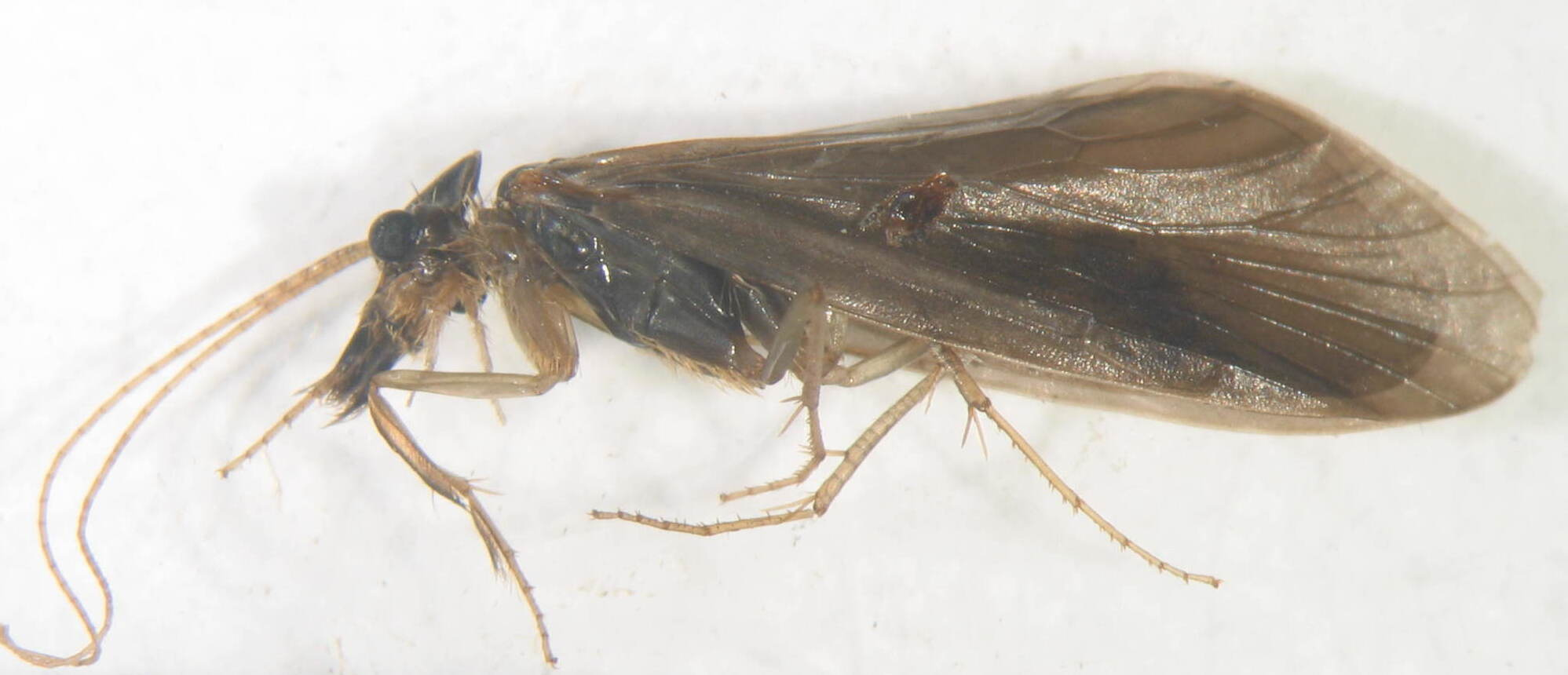
- Caenota plicata

Scientific classification
- Kingdom: Animalia
- Phylum: Arthropoda
- Clade: Pancrustacea
- Class: Insecta
- Order: Trichoptera
- Family: Calocidae

= Calocidae =

Family of insects

Calocidae is a family of caddisflies belonging to the order Trichoptera.

Genera:

- Alloecentrella Wise, 1958
- Caenota Mosely, 1953
- Caloca Mosely, 1953
- Calocoides Neboiss, 1984
- Latarima Shackleton, Webb, Lawler & Suter, 2014
- Pliocaloca Neboiss, 1984
- Pycnocentrella Mosely, 1953
- Tamasia Mosely, 1936
