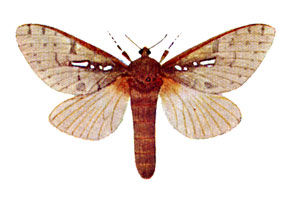
- Wiseana cervinata

Scientific classification
- Kingdom: Animalia
- Phylum: Arthropoda
- Clade: Pancrustacea
- Class: Insecta
- Order: Lepidoptera
- Family: Hepialidae
- Genus: Wiseana; Viette, 1961

Species
- See text.

Synonyms
- Porina Walker, 1856 (nec d'Orbigny, 1852); Gorina Quail, 1899; Goryna Quail, 1899; Philpottia Viette, 1950

= Wiseana =

Genus of moths

Wiseana is a genus of ghost moths, collectively known as porina, of the family Hepialidae. There are seven described species, all endemic to New Zealand. Some species of this genus are a major pest in New Zealand exotic pastures. It is impossible to distinguish species at the larval/caterpillar stage without DNA technology, however adult porina moth species can be visually distinguished.

The genus was first identified by Pierre Viette in 1961, who recognised a distinction between the New Zealand members of the genus Oxycanus and those occurring in Australia and New Guinea.

== Species ==
- Wiseana cervinata (Walker, 1865)

- Recorded food plants: Trifolium, various grasses.

- Wiseana copularis (Meyrick, 1912)
- Wiseana fuliginea (Butler, 1879)
- Wiseana jocosa (Meyrick, 1912)

- Larva feeds on grasses

- Wiseana mimica (Philpott, 1923)
- Wiseana signata (Walker, 1856)

- Larva feeds on grasses

- Wiseana umbraculata (Guenée, 1868)

- Larva feeds on grasses
