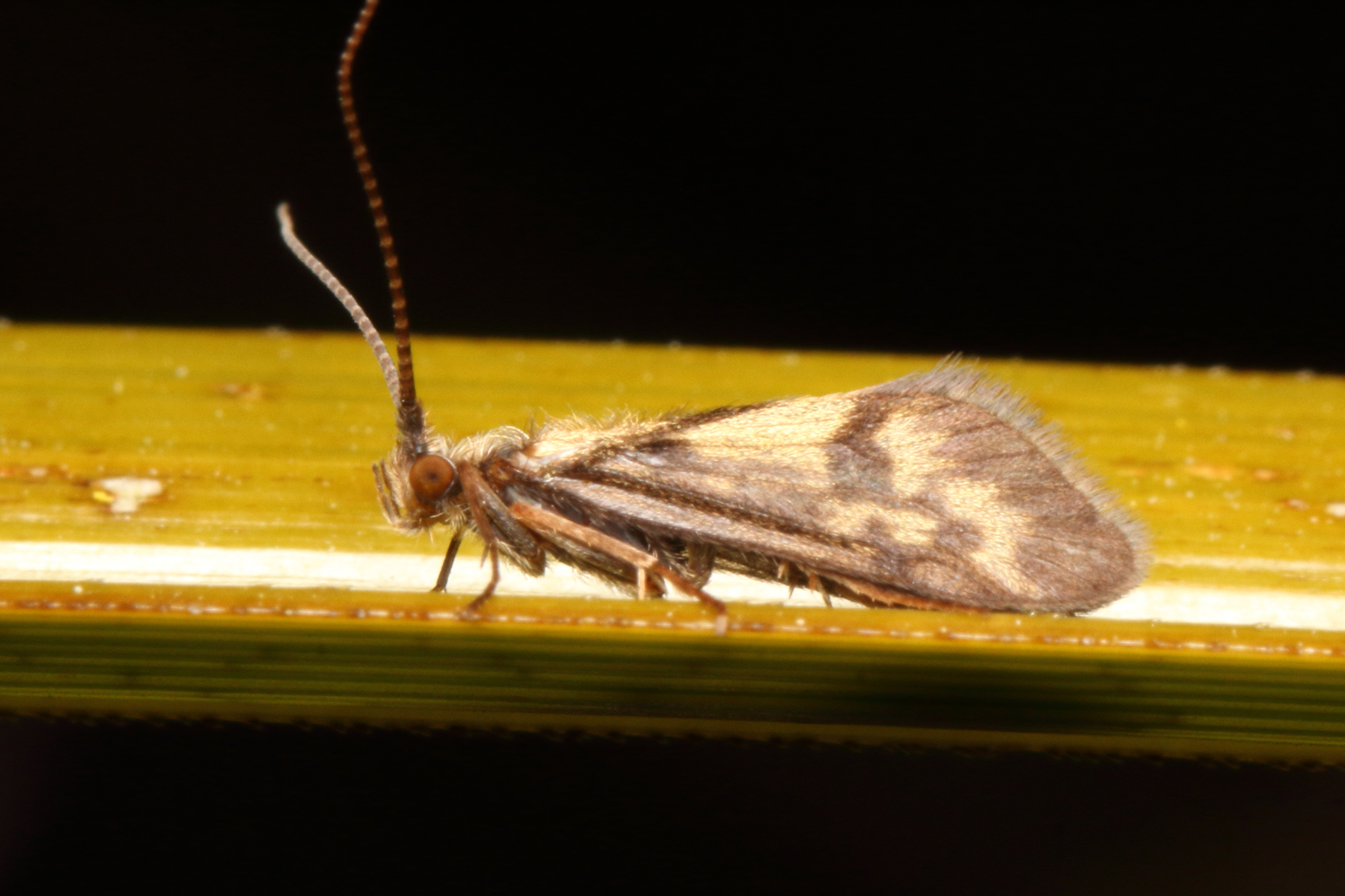
- Pycnocentrodes, New Zealand

Scientific classification
- Kingdom: Animalia
- Phylum: Arthropoda
- Clade: Pancrustacea
- Class: Insecta
- Order: Trichoptera
- Family: Conoesucidae

= Conoesucidae =

Family of caddisflies

Conoesucidae is a family of caddisflies in the order Trichoptera. There are about 12 genera and more than 40 described species in Conoesucidae, found in New Zealand and Australia.

== Genera ==
These 12 genera belong to the family Conoesucidae:

- Beraeoptera Mosely, 1953
- Coenoria Mosely, 1953
- Confluens Wise, 1962
- Conoesucus Mosely, 1936
- Costora Mosely, 1936
- Hampa Mosely, 1953
- Lingora Mosely, 1936
- Matasia Mosely, 1936
- Olinga McLachlan, 1894
- Periwinkla McFarlane, 1973
- Pycnocentria McLachlan, 1866
- Pycnocentrodes Tillyard, 1924
