= Cryptopygus antarcticus =

Scientific classification
- Domain: Eukaryota
- Kingdom: Animalia
- Phylum: Arthropoda
- Class: Collembola
- Order: Entomobryomorpha
- Family: Isotomidae
- Genus: Cryptopygus
- Species: C. antarcticus

Binomial name
- Cryptopygus antarcticus Willem, 1901

Subspecies
- Cryptopygus antarcticus antarcticus Cryptopygus antarcticus maximus Cryptopygus antarcticus reagens Cryptopygus antarcticus travei

Species of springtail

Cryptopygus antarcticus, the Antarctic springtail, is a species of springtail native to Antarctica and Australia. Cryptopygus antarcticus average 1–2 millimetres (0.04–0.08 in) long and weigh only a few micrograms. Like other springtails, the Antarctic springtail has been found to be useful as a bioindicator of pollution and has been used to study microplastic pollution in Antarctica. They also tend aggregate, by signaling to other individuals via pheromones, especially when temperatures are low, to avoid a high water loss rate.
