= Alloecentrella =

Scientific classification
- Kingdom: Animalia
- Phylum: Arthropoda
- Clade: Pancrustacea
- Class: Insecta
- Order: Trichoptera
- Family: Calocidae
- Genus: Alloecentrella; Wise, 1958

Genus of insects

Alloecentrella is a genus of caddisflies belonging to the order Trichoptera. The genus was first recognised by Keith Arthur John Wise in 1958.

== Taxonomy ==
Wise originally considered the genus to be within the family Beraeidae. The genus was created because Wise could not place the type specimen, Alloecentrella magnicornis, into any pre-existing genera due to morphological differences of the discoidal cell in the anterior wing of the species. The genus was monotypic until 2007, when three new species were described.

Since 1978 the genus has been placed in family Calocidae. Henderson & Ward (2007) argued that Alloecentrella should be placed within Helicophidae, something supported by a phylogenetic analysis in 2008.

== Distribution ==
The genus is endemic to New Zealand. A. incisus and A. magnicornis are found in the North Island, while A. cirratus and A. linearis are found on the South Island.

== Species ==
- Alloecentrella cirratus IM Henderson & JB Ward, 2007
- Alloecentrella incisus IM Henderson & JB Ward, 2007
- Alloecentrella linearis IM Henderson & JB Ward, 2007
- Alloecentrella magnicornis Wise, 1958
