= List of Hydropsyche species =

This is a list of 266 species in the genus Hydropsyche.

== Hydropsyche species ==
- Hydropsyche abyssinica Kimmins, 1963
- Hydropsyche acinoxas Malicky, 1981
- Hydropsyche acuta Martynov, 1909
- Hydropsyche adrastos Malicky & Chantaramongkol, 1996
- Hydropsyche adspersa Navás, 1932
- Hydropsyche aerata Ross, 1938
- Hydropsyche afghanistanica Schmid, 1963
- Hydropsyche aiakos Malicky, 1997
- Hydropsyche alabama Lago & Harris, 1991
- Hydropsyche alaca Malicky, 1974
- Hydropsyche alanya Sipahiler, 1987
- Hydropsyche alhedra (Ross, 1939)
- Hydropsyche alternans (Walker, 1852)
- Hydropsyche alvata Denning, 1949
- Hydropsyche ambigua Schmid, 1973
- Hydropsyche ambonensis Mey, 1998
- Hydropsyche anachoreta Mey & Jung, 1986
- Hydropsyche ancorapunctata Tanida, 1986
- Hydropsyche angustipennis (Curtis, 1834)
- Hydropsyche annulata (Ulmer, 1905)
- Hydropsyche appendicularis Martynov, 1931
- Hydropsyche arinale Ross, 1938
- Hydropsyche asiatica Ulmer, 1905
- Hydropsyche auricolor Ulmer, 1905
- Hydropsyche bacanensis Mey, 1998
- Hydropsyche banksi Kimmins, 1955
- Hydropsyche bassi Flint, Voshell & Parker, 1979
- Hydropsyche batavorum Botosaneanu, 1979
- Hydropsyche betteni Ross, 1938
- Hydropsyche bidens Ross, 1938
- Hydropsyche bidentata Denning, 1948
- Hydropsyche binaria Mey, 1996
- Hydropsyche bitlis Malicky, 1986
- Hydropsyche borealis Martynov, 1926
- Hydropsyche botosaneanui Marinkovic-Gospodnetic, 1966
- Hydropsyche breviculata Kobayashi, 1987
- Hydropsyche brevis Mosely, 1930
- Hydropsyche bronta Ross, 1938
- Hydropsyche brunneipennis Flint & Butler, 1983
- Hydropsyche bryanti Banks, 1939
- Hydropsyche buenafei Mey, 1998
- Hydropsyche buergersi Ulmer, 1915
- Hydropsyche bujnurdica Botosaneanu, 1998
- Hydropsyche bulbifera McLachlan, 1878
- Hydropsyche bulgaromanorum Malicky, 1977
- Hydropsyche buyssoni Ulmer, 1907
- Hydropsyche bwambana Mosely, 1939
- Hydropsyche californica Banks, 1899
- Hydropsyche carolina Banks, 1938
- Hydropsyche catawba Ross, 1939
- Hydropsyche cebuensis Mey, 1998
- Hydropsyche celebensis Ulmer, 1951
- Hydropsyche cetibeli Malicky & Sipahiler, 1993
- Hydropsyche claviformis Mey, 1996
- Hydropsyche complicata Banks, 1939
- Hydropsyche confusa (Walker, 1852)
- Hydropsyche consanguinea McLachlan, 1884
- Hydropsyche contubernalis McLachlan, 1865
- Hydropsyche cornuta Martynov, 1909
- Hydropsyche cuanis Ross, 1938
- Hydropsyche cyrnotica Botosaneanu & Giudicelli, 1981
- Hydropsyche davisi Mey, 1998
- Hydropsyche debirasi Malicky, 1974
- Hydropsyche decalda Ross, 1947
- Hydropsyche decora Navás, 1932
- Hydropsyche delrio Ross, 1941
- Hydropsyche demavenda Malicky, 1977
- Hydropsyche demora Ross, 1941
- Hydropsyche depravata Hagen, 1861
- Hydropsyche dhusaravarna Schmid, 1975
- Hydropsyche dicantha Ross, 1938
- Hydropsyche didyma Mey, 1999
- Hydropsyche difficultata Kobayashi, 1984
- Hydropsyche dilatata Tanida, 1986
- Hydropsyche dinarica Marinkovic-Gospodnetic, 1979
- Hydropsyche discreta Tjeder, 1952
- Hydropsyche djabai Schmid, 1959
- Hydropsyche doctersi Ulmer, 1951
- Hydropsyche doehleri Tobias, 1972
- Hydropsyche dubia Schmid, 1952
- Hydropsyche effusa Mey, 1996
- Hydropsyche elissoma Ross, 1947
- Hydropsyche emarginata Navas, 1923
- Hydropsyche erythrophthalma McLachlan, 1875
- Hydropsyche exocellata Dufour, 1841
- Hydropsyche fasciolata Navás, 1926
- Hydropsyche fattigi Ross, 1941
- Hydropsyche fezana Navás, 1932
- Hydropsyche fischeri Botosaneanu, 1980
- Hydropsyche flynni Korboot, 1964
- Hydropsyche formosae Iwata, 1928
- Hydropsyche formosana Ulmer, 1911
- Hydropsyche franclemonti Flint, 1992
- Hydropsyche frisoni Ross, 1938
- Hydropsyche fryeri Ulmer, 1915
- Hydropsyche fulvipes (Curtis, 1834)
- Hydropsyche fumata Tobias, 1972
- Hydropsyche furcula Tian & Li, 1985
- Hydropsyche gemecika Malicky, 1981
- Hydropsyche gemellata Mey, 1998
- Hydropsyche gereckei Moretti, 1991
- Hydropsyche gerostizai Mey, 1998
- Hydropsyche gifuana Ulmer, 1907
- Hydropsyche grahami Banks, 1940
- Hydropsyche guttata Pictet, 1834
- Hydropsyche hackeri Mey, 1998
- Hydropsyche hageni Banks, 1905
- Hydropsyche hamifera Ulmer, 1905
- Hydropsyche harpagofalcata Mey, 1995
- Hydropsyche hedini Forsslund, 1935
- Hydropsyche hobbyi Mosely, 1951
- Hydropsyche hoenei Schmid, 1959
- Hydropsyche hoffmani Ross, 1962
- Hydropsyche hreblayi Mey, 1998
- Hydropsyche iberomaroccana Gonzalez & Malicky, 1999
- Hydropsyche impula Denning, 1948
- Hydropsyche incognita Pitsch, 1993
- Hydropsyche incommoda Hagen, 1861
- Hydropsyche indica Betten, 1909
- Hydropsyche infernalis Schmid, 1952
- Hydropsyche initiana Mey, 1998
- Hydropsyche injusta Banks, 1938
- Hydropsyche instabilis (Curtis, 1834)
- Hydropsyche iokaste Malicky, 1999
- Hydropsyche irroratella Ulmer, 1951
- Hydropsyche isolata Banks, 1931
- Hydropsyche janstockiana Botosaneanu, 1979
- Hydropsyche javanica Ulmer, 1905
- Hydropsyche jeanneli Mosely, 1939
- Hydropsyche jordanensis Tjeder, 1946
- Hydropsyche kagiana Kobayashi, 1987
- Hydropsyche kalliesi Mey, 1999
- Hydropsyche katugahakanda Schmid, 1958
- Hydropsyche kawamurai Tsuda, 1940
- Hydropsyche kebab Malicky, 1974
- Hydropsyche kinzelbachi Malicky, 1980
- Hydropsyche kirikhan Sipahiler, 1998
- Hydropsyche klefbecki Tjeder, 1946
- Hydropsyche kreuzbergorum Mey & Jung, 1989
- Hydropsyche lagranja Botosaneanu, 1999
- Hydropsyche leonardi Ross, 1938
- Hydropsyche lepnevae Botosaneanu, 1968
- Hydropsyche leptocerina Navas, 1917
- Hydropsyche lobata McLachlan, 1884
- Hydropsyche lobulata Martynov, 1936
- Hydropsyche longifurca Kimmins, 1957
- Hydropsyche longindex Botosaneanu & Moubayed, 1985
- Hydropsyche longipalpis Banks, 1920
- Hydropsyche maderensis Hagen, 1865
- Hydropsyche mahrkusha Schmid, 1959
- Hydropsyche malassanka Schmid, 1958
- Hydropsyche malickyi Mey, 1998
- Hydropsyche maniemensis Marlier, 1961
- Hydropsyche marceus Scudder, 1890
- Hydropsyche maroccana Navás, 1936
- Hydropsyche marqueti Navas, 1907
- Hydropsyche martynovi Botosaneanu, 1968
- Hydropsyche maura Navás, 1932
- Hydropsyche mississippiensis Flint, 1972
- Hydropsyche modesta Navás, 1925
- Hydropsyche mokaensis Jacquemart, 1960
- Hydropsyche morettii De Pietro, 1996
- Hydropsyche morla Malicky & Lounaci, 1987
- Hydropsyche morosa Hagen, 1861
- Hydropsyche mostarensis Klapalek, 1898
- Hydropsyche namwa Mosely, 1939
- Hydropsyche napaea Mey, 1996
- Hydropsyche nasuta Ulmer, 1930
- Hydropsyche naumanni Mey, 1998
- Hydropsyche negrosensis Mey, 1998
- Hydropsyche nervosa Klapalek, 1899
- Hydropsyche nuristanica Schmid, 1963
- Hydropsyche obscura Navás, 1928
- Hydropsyche occidentalis Banks, 1900
- Hydropsyche operta (Scudder, 1877)
- Hydropsyche opthalmica Flint, 1965
- Hydropsyche orbiculata Ulmer, 1911
- Hydropsyche orduensis Sipahiler, 1987
- Hydropsyche orectis Mey, 1999
- Hydropsyche ornatula McLachlan, 1878
- Hydropsyche orris Ross, 1938
- Hydropsyche oslari (Banks, 1905)
- Hydropsyche palawanensis Mey, 1998
- Hydropsyche pallidipennis Martynov, 1935
- Hydropsyche pallipennis Banks, 1938
- Hydropsyche palpalis Navás, 1936
- Hydropsyche patera Schuster & Etnier, 1978
- Hydropsyche pellucidula (Curtis, 1834)
- Hydropsyche perelin Malicky, 1987
- Hydropsyche peristerica Botosaneanu & Marinkovic-Gospodnetic, 1968
- Hydropsyche phalerata Hagen, 1861
- Hydropsyche philo Ross, 1941
- Hydropsyche pictetorum Botosaneanu & Schmid, 1973
- Hydropsyche placoda Ross, 1941
- Hydropsyche plana Forsslund, 1936
- Hydropsyche plesia Navás, 1934
- Hydropsyche pluvialis Navás, 1932
- Hydropsyche polyacantha Li & Tian, 1989
- Hydropsyche potomacensis Flint, 1965
- Hydropsyche poushyamittra Schmid, 1961
- Hydropsyche propinqua Ulmer, 1907
- Hydropsyche punica Malicky, 1981
- Hydropsyche rakshakaha Olah, 1994
- Hydropsyche reciproca (Walker, 1852)
- Hydropsyche renschi Mey, 1999
- Hydropsyche resmineda Malicky, 1977
- Hydropsyche ressli Malicky, 1974
- Hydropsyche rhomboana Martynov, 1909
- Hydropsyche rizali Banks, 1937
- Hydropsyche rossi Flint, Voshell & Parker, 1979
- Hydropsyche rotosa Ross, 1947
- Hydropsyche sagittata Martynov, 1936
- Hydropsyche sakarawaka Schmid, 1959
- Hydropsyche salki Mey, 1998
- Hydropsyche sappho Malicky, 1976
- Hydropsyche saranganica Ulmer, 1951
- Hydropsyche sattlerorum Tobias, 1972
- Hydropsyche saxonica McLachlan, 1884
- Hydropsyche scalaris Hagen, 1861
- Hydropsyche sciligra Malicky, 1977
- Hydropsyche scudderi Cockerell, 1909
- Hydropsyche selysi Ulmer, 1907
- Hydropsyche seramensis Mey, 1998
- Hydropsyche sikkimensis Mey, 1996
- Hydropsyche siltalai Doehler, 1963
- Hydropsyche simulans Ross, 1938
- Hydropsyche simulata Mosely, 1942
- Hydropsyche sinuata Botosaneanu & Marinkovic-Gospodnetic, 1968
- Hydropsyche sirimauna Mey, 1998
- Hydropsyche slossonae (Walker, 1852)
- Hydropsyche smiljae Marinkovic-Gospodnetic, 1979
- Hydropsyche sparna (Ross, 1938)
- Hydropsyche speciophila Mey, 1981
- Hydropsyche spiritoi Moretti, 1991
- Hydropsyche staphylostirpis Mey, 1998
- Hydropsyche striolata Navás, 1934
- Hydropsyche sulana Mey, 1998
- Hydropsyche supersonica Malicky, 1981
- Hydropsyche suppleta Mey, 1998
- Hydropsyche tabacarui Botosaneanu, 1960
- Hydropsyche tabulifera Schmid, 1963
- Hydropsyche taiwanensis Mey, 1998
- Hydropsyche talautensis Mey, 1999
- Hydropsyche tapena Kimmins, 1957
- Hydropsyche tenuis Navás, 1932
- Hydropsyche teruela Malicky, 1980
- Hydropsyche theodoriana Botosaneanu, 1974
- Hydropsyche tibetana Schmid, 1965
- Hydropsyche tibilais McLachlan, 1884
- Hydropsyche tigrata Malicky, 1974
- Hydropsyche tismanae Murgoci, 1968
- Hydropsyche tobiasi Malicky, 1977
- Hydropsyche trimonticola Mey, 1996
- Hydropsyche ulmeri Barnard, 1934
- Hydropsyche urgorrii Gonzalez & Malicky, 1980
- Hydropsyche valanis Ross, 1938
- Hydropsyche valkanovi Kumanski, 1974
- Hydropsyche venularis Banks, 1914
- Hydropsyche vespertina Flint, 1967
- Hydropsyche volitans Navas, 1924
- Hydropsyche vulpina Navás, 1934
- Hydropsyche walkeri (Betten & Mosely, 1940)
- Hydropsyche waltoni Martynov, 1930
- Hydropsyche wamba Mosely, 1939
- Hydropsyche winema Denning, 1965
- Hydropsyche wittei Marlier, 1943
