= List of Smicridea species =

This is a list of 180 species in Smicridea, a genus of netspinning caddisflies in the family Hydropsychidae.

== Smicridea species ==
- Smicridea abrupta Flint, 1974^{i c g}
- Smicridea acuminata Flint, 1974^{i c g}
- Smicridea aequalis Banks, 1920^{i c g}
- Smicridea albifrontalis Martynov, 1912^{i c g}
- Smicridea albosignata Ulmer, 1907^{i c g}
- Smicridea alticola Flint, 1964^{i c g}
- Smicridea amplispina Flint, 1981^{i c g}
- Smicridea anaticula Flint, 1981^{i c g}
- Smicridea andicola Flint, 1991^{i c g}
- Smicridea annulicornis (Blanchard in Gay, 1851)^{i c g}
- Smicridea anomala Flint & Denning, 1989^{i c g}
- Smicridea anticura Flint & Denning, 1989^{i c g}
- Smicridea appendicula Flint, 1974^{i c g}
- Smicridea appendiculata Flint, 1972^{i c g}
- Smicridea araguaiense ^{g}
- Smicridea argentina (Navas, 1918)^{i c g}
- Smicridea aries Blahnik, 1995^{i c g}
- Smicridea arizonensis Flint, 1974^{i c g}
- Smicridea astarte Malicky, 1980^{i c g}
- Smicridea aterrima Ulmer, 1911^{i c g}
- Smicridea atrobasis Flint, 1983^{i c g}
- Smicridea aurra Flint, 1991^{i c g}
- Smicridea australis Ulmer, 1908^{i c g}
- Smicridea banksi Flint, 1967^{i c g}
- Smicridea bicornuta ^{g}
- Smicridea bidactyla Flint & Reyes-Arrunategui, 1991^{i c g}
- Smicridea bidentata Martynov, 1912^{i c g}
- Smicridea bifasciata ^{g}
- Smicridea bifurcata Flint, 1974^{i c g}
- Smicridea biserrulata Flint, 1991^{i c g}
- Smicridea bivittata (Hagen, 1861)^{i c g}
- Smicridea brasiliana (Ulmer, 1905)^{i c g}
- Smicridea breviuncata Flint, 1974^{i c g}
- Smicridea bulara Flint & Denning, 1989^{i c g}
- Smicridea bulbosa Flint, 1974^{i c g}
- Smicridea caldwelli Ross, 1947^{i c g}
- Smicridea caligata Flint, 1974^{i c g}
- Smicridea calopa Flint, 1974^{i c g}
- Smicridea campana Flint, 1974^{i c g}
- Smicridea cariba Flint, 1968^{i c g}
- Smicridea cartiensis Flint & Denning, 1989^{i c g}
- Smicridea catherinae Blahnik, 1995^{i c g}
- Smicridea chicoana Flint, 1983^{i c g}
- Smicridea cholta Flint, 1974^{i c g}
- Smicridea circinata Flint & Denning, 1989^{i c g}
- Smicridea columbiana (Ulmer, 1905)^{i c}
- Smicridea comma Banks, 1924^{i c g}
- Smicridea completa Banks, 1941^{i c g}
- Smicridea complicatissima Flint & Denning, 1989^{i c g}
- Smicridea compostela Bueno-Soria, 1986^{i c g}
- Smicridea conjuncta Flint, 1991^{i c g}
- Smicridea cornuta Flint, 1974^{i c g}
- Smicridea coronata Flint, 1980^{i c g}
- Smicridea corralita Flint & Denning, 1989^{i c g}
- Smicridea cubana Kumanski, 1987^{i c g}
- Smicridea cuna Flint, 1974^{i c g}
- Smicridea curvipenis Flint, 1991^{i c g}
- Smicridea dampfi Flint, 1974^{i c g}
- Smicridea decora (Navás, 1930)^{i c}
- Smicridea dentifera Flint, 1983^{i c g}
- Smicridea dentisserrata ^{g}
- Smicridea discalis Flint, 1972^{i c g}
- Smicridea dispar (Banks, 1905)^{i c g b}
- Smicridea dithyra Flint, 1974^{i c g}
- Smicridea ephippifera Flint, 1978^{i c g}
- Smicridea erecta Flint, 1974^{i c g}
- Smicridea exu Bonfá-Neto, Desidério & Salles 2025
- Smicridea fasciatella McLachlan, 1871^{i c g}
- Smicridea filicata Flint & Denning, 1989^{i c g}
- Smicridea flinti ^{g}
- Smicridea forcipata Flint, 1983^{i c g}
- Smicridea franciscana ^{g}
- Smicridea frequens (Navás, 1930)^{i c g}
- Smicridea fuscifurca Botosaneanu, 1998^{i c g}
- Smicridea gemina Blahnik, 1995^{i c g}
- Smicridea gladiator Flint, 1978^{i c g}
- Smicridea gomezi Blahnik, 1995^{i c g}
- Smicridea gomphotheria Blahnik, 1995^{i c g}
- Smicridea grandis Flint, 1968^{i c g}
- Smicridea grandisaccata Flint, 1991^{i c g}
- Smicridea grenadensis Flint, 1968^{i c g}
- Smicridea helenae Albino & Pes, 2011^{g}
- Smicridea holzenthali Flint & Denning, 1989^{i c g}
- Smicridea hybrida Blahnik, 1995^{i c g}
- Smicridea iguazu Flint, 1983^{i c g}
- Smicridea inaequispina Flint, 1974^{i c g}
- Smicridea inarmata Flint, 1974^{i c g}
- Smicridea jamaicensis Flint, 1968^{i c g}
- Smicridea jundiai Almeida & Flint, 2002^{g}
- Smicridea karukerae Botosaneanu, 1994^{i c g}
- Smicridea lacanja Bueno-Soria & Hamilton, 1986^{i c g}
- Smicridea latipala Flint & Denning, 1989^{i c g}
- Smicridea lobata (Ulmer, 1909)^{i c g}
- Smicridea magdalenae Flint, 1991^{i c g}
- Smicridea magnipinnata Flint, 1991^{i c g}
- Smicridea manzanara Flint & Denning, 1989^{i c g}
- Smicridea marlieri Flint, 1978^{i c g}
- Smicridea marua Flint, 1978^{i c g}
- Smicridea matagalpa Flint, 1974^{i c g}
- Smicridea matancilla Flint & Denning, 1989^{i c g}
- Smicridea meridensis Botosaneanu & Flint, 1982^{i c g}
- Smicridea mesembrina (Navas, 1918)^{i c g}
- Smicridea microsaccata Flint, 1991^{i c g}
- Smicridea minima Flint, 1968^{i c g}
- Smicridea minuscula Flint, 1973^{i c g}
- Smicridea mirama Flint & Denning, 1989^{i c g}
- Smicridea mucronata Flint & Denning, 1989^{i c g}
- Smicridea multidens Flint & Denning, 1989^{i c g}
- Smicridea murina McLachlan, 1871^{i c g}
- Smicridea nahuatl Flint, 1974^{i c g}
- Smicridea nanda Flint, 1983^{i c g}
- Smicridea necator ^{g}
- Smicridea nemorosa Holzenthal & Blahnik, 1995^{i c g}
- Smicridea nigerrima Flint, 1983^{i c g}
- Smicridea nigricans Flint, 1991^{i c g}
- Smicridea nigripennis Banks, 1920^{i c g}
- Smicridea obesa Banks, 1938^{i c g}
- Smicridea obliqua Flint, 1974^{i c g}
- Smicridea octospina Flint, 1974^{i c g}
- Smicridea olivacea Flint, 1983^{i c g}
- Smicridea palifera Flint, 1981^{i c g}
- Smicridea pallidivittata Flint, 1972^{i c g}
- Smicridea palmar Sganga, 2005^{g}
- Smicridea pampena Flint, 1980^{i c g}
- Smicridea paranensis Flint, 1983^{i c g}
- Smicridea parva Banks, 1939^{i c g}
- Smicridea parvula Mosely in Mosely & Kimmins, 1953^{i c g}
- Smicridea penai Flint & Denning, 1989^{i c g}
- Smicridea peruana (Martynov, 1912)^{i c g}
- Smicridea petasata Flint, 1981^{i c g}
- Smicridea pipila Flint, 1974^{i c g}
- Smicridea piraya Flint, 1983^{i c g}
- Smicridea polyfasciata Martynov, 1912^{i c g}
- Smicridea probolophora Flint, 1991^{i c g}
- Smicridea prorigera Flint, 1991^{i c g}
- Smicridea protera (Denning, 1948)^{i c g}
- Smicridea pseudolobata Flint, 1978^{i c g}
- Smicridea pseudoradula Flint, 1991^{i c g}
- Smicridea pucara Flint & Denning, 1989^{i c g}
- Smicridea radula Flint, 1974^{i c g}
- Smicridea rara Bueno-Soria, 1979^{i c g}
- Smicridea redunca Flint & Denning, 1989^{i c g}
- Smicridea reinerti Flint, 1978^{i c g}
- Smicridea riita Flint, 1981^{i c g}
- Smicridea roraimense Albino & Pes, 2011^{g}
- Smicridea ruginasa Flint, 1991^{i c g}
- Smicridea salta Flint, 1974^{i c g}
- Smicridea sattleri Denning & Sykora, 1968^{i c g}
- Smicridea saucia McLachlan, 1871^{i c g}
- Smicridea scutellaria Flint, 1974^{i c g}
- Smicridea sepala ^{g}
- Smicridea sexspinosa Flint, 1978^{i c g}
- Smicridea signata (Banks, 1903)^{i c g b}
- Smicridea simmonsi Flint, 1968^{i c g}
- Smicridea singri Holzenthal & Blahnik, 1995^{i c g}
- Smicridea sirena Bueno-Soria, 1986^{i c g}
- Smicridea smilodon Flint & Denning, 1989^{i c g}
- Smicridea soyatepecana Bueno-Soria, 1986^{i c g}
- Smicridea spinulosa Flint, 1972^{i c g}
- Smicridea talamanca Flint, 1974^{i c g}
- Smicridea tapanti Holzenthal & Blahnik, 1995^{i c g}
- Smicridea tarasca Flint, 1974^{i c g}
- Smicridea titschacki Flint, 1975^{i c g}
- Smicridea tobada Flint & Denning, 1989^{i c g}
- Smicridea tregala Flint & Denning, 1989^{i c g}
- Smicridea truncata Flint, 1974^{i c g}
- Smicridea turgida Flint & Denning, 1989^{i c g}
- Smicridea turrialbana Flint, 1974^{i c g}
- Smicridea ulmeri Banks, 1939^{i c g}
- Smicridea ulva Flint, 1974^{i c g}
- Smicridea unguiculata Flint, 1983^{i c g}
- Smicridea unicolor (Banks, 1901)^{i c g}
- Smicridea urra Flint, 1991^{i c g}
- Smicridea varia (Banks, 1913)^{i c g}
- Smicridea ventridenticulata Flint, 1991^{i c g}
- Smicridea veracruzensis Flint, 1974^{i c g}
- Smicridea vermiculata Flint, 1978^{i c g}
- Smicridea vilela Flint, 1978^{i c g}
- Smicridea villarricensis Flint, 1983^{i c g}
- Smicridea voluta Flint, 1978^{i c g}
- Smicridea weidneri Flint, 1972^{i c g}

Data sources: i = ITIS, c = Catalogue of Life, g = GBIF, b = Bugguide.net
