= List of Cheumatopsyche species =

This is a list of 244 species in the genus Cheumatopsyche.

== Cheumatopsyche species ==
- Cheumatopsyche addita (Navas, 1916)
- Cheumatopsyche admetos Malicky & Chantaramongkol, 1996
- Cheumatopsyche akana Statzner, 1984
- Cheumatopsyche albocincta (Banks, 1937)
- Cheumatopsyche albofasciata (McLachlan, 1872)
- Cheumatopsyche albomaculata (Ulmer, 1905)
- Cheumatopsyche alfierii (Navas, 1927)
- Cheumatopsyche amboinica (Navas, 1928)
- Cheumatopsyche amiena Sykora, 1967
- Cheumatopsyche amurensis Martynov, 1934
- Cheumatopsyche analis (Banks, 1903)
- Cheumatopsyche anema Marlier, 1959
- Cheumatopsyche angusta (Ulmer, 1930)
- Cheumatopsyche anthracias Mey, 1996
- Cheumatopsyche antoniensis Malicky, 1982
- Cheumatopsyche aphanta Ross, 1938
- Cheumatopsyche apicata (Navás, 1931)
- Cheumatopsyche arizonensis (Ling, 1938)
- Cheumatopsyche aterrima Marlier, 1961
- Cheumatopsyche atlantis (Navás, 1930)
- Cheumatopsyche automedon Malicky & Chantaramongkol in Malicky, 1997
- Cheumatopsyche banaueensis Mey, 1995
- Cheumatopsyche banksi Mosely, 1942
- Cheumatopsyche bardiana Malicky, 1997
- Cheumatopsyche beroni Kumanski, 1979
- Cheumatopsyche bhatrapura Malicky, 1979
- Cheumatopsyche bibbensis Gordon, Harris & Lago, 1986
- Cheumatopsyche bifida Statzner, 1975
- Cheumatopsyche bimaculata (Ulmer, 1930)
- Cheumatopsyche boettgeri Statzner, 1975
- Cheumatopsyche brevilineata (Iwata, 1927)
- Cheumatopsyche brevis (Ulmer, 1930)
- Cheumatopsyche brunnea Jacquemart, 1961
- Cheumatopsyche burgeonia (Navás, 1931)
- Cheumatopsyche burksi Ross, 1941
- Cheumatopsyche cahaba Gordon, Harris & Lago, 1986
- Cheumatopsyche caieta Malicky & Chantaramongkol in Malicky, 1997
- Cheumatopsyche calawagana Mey, 1995
- Cheumatopsyche camena Malicky, 1997
- Cheumatopsyche camilla Malicky, 1997
- Cheumatopsyche campyla Ross, 1938
- Cheumatopsyche capitata Navás, 1936
- Cheumatopsyche capitella (Martynov, 1927)
- Cheumatopsyche caprotina Malicky, 1997
- Cheumatopsyche carmentis Malicky & Chantaramongkol in Malicky, 1997
- Cheumatopsyche carna Malicky & Chantaramongkol in Malicky, 1997
- Cheumatopsyche ceramensis Mey, 1999
- Cheumatopsyche ceres Malicky & Chantaramongkol in Malicky, 1997
- Cheumatopsyche chariklo Malicky & Chantaramongkol in Malicky, 1997
- Cheumatopsyche charites Malicky & Chantaramongkol in Malicky, 1997
- Cheumatopsyche charybdis Malicky, 1997
- Cheumatopsyche cheesmanae (Kimmins, 1962)
- Cheumatopsyche chekiangensis Schmid, 1965
- Cheumatopsyche chihonana Kobayashi, 1987
- Cheumatopsyche chimaira Malicky, 1997
- Cheumatopsyche chinensis (Martynov, 1930)
- Cheumatopsyche chione Malicky & Chantaramongkol in Malicky, 1997
- Cheumatopsyche chlorogastra (Navas, 1932)
- Cheumatopsyche chryseis Malicky & Chantaramongkol in Malicky, 1997
- Cheumatopsyche chrysothemis Malicky & Chantaramongkol in Malicky, 1997
- Cheumatopsyche clavalis (Martynov, 1930)
- Cheumatopsyche cocles Malicky & Chantaramongkol in Malicky, 1997
- Cheumatopsyche cognita (Ulmer, 1951)
- Cheumatopsyche columnata Martynov, 1935
- Cheumatopsyche comis Arnold & Arnold, 1961
- Cheumatopsyche comorina (Navás, 1931)
- Cheumatopsyche concava (Ulmer, 1930)
- Cheumatopsyche concordia Malicky, 1997
- Cheumatopsyche contexta Ulmer, 1951
- Cheumatopsyche copia Malicky & Chantaramongkol in Malicky, 1997
- Cheumatopsyche copiosa Kimmins, 1956
- Cheumatopsyche cornix Malicky, 1997
- Cheumatopsyche costalis (Banks, 1913)
- Cheumatopsyche cressida Malicky, 1997
- Cheumatopsyche criseyde Malicky & Chantaramongkol in Malicky, 1997
- Cheumatopsyche curvata Martynov, 1935
- Cheumatopsyche danae Malicky, 1998
- Cheumatopsyche daurensis Ivanov in Arefina, Ivanov & Levanidova, 1996
- Cheumatopsyche delamarei (Jacquemart, 1965)
- Cheumatopsyche dhanikari Malicky, 1979
- Cheumatopsyche diehli Malicky, 1997
- Cheumatopsyche digitata (Mosely, 1935)
- Cheumatopsyche diminuta (Walker, 1852)
- Cheumatopsyche dubitans Mosely, 1942
- Cheumatopsyche edista Gordon, 1974
- Cheumatopsyche ela Denning, 1942
- Cheumatopsyche enonis Ross, 1938
- Cheumatopsyche ernstheissi Malicky, 1997
- Cheumatopsyche etrona Ross, 1941
- Cheumatopsyche excisa (Ulmer, 1930)
- Cheumatopsyche expeditionis (Ulmer, 1938)
- Cheumatopsyche explicanda Statzner, 1975
- Cheumatopsyche falcifera (Ulmer, 1930)
- Cheumatopsyche fansipangensis Mey, 1996
- Cheumatopsyche fausta (Navas, 1936)
- Cheumatopsyche flavosulphurea Mey, 1998
- Cheumatopsyche fulvescens (Navas, 1932)
- Cheumatopsyche fusca (Navas, 1936)
- Cheumatopsyche gaia Malicky, 1997
- Cheumatopsyche galahittigama (Schmid, 1958)
- Cheumatopsyche galapitikanda (Schmid, 1958)
- Cheumatopsyche galloisi (Matsumura, 1931)
- Cheumatopsyche gelita Denning, 1952
- Cheumatopsyche geora Denning, 1948
- Cheumatopsyche georgulmeri Mey, 1998
- Cheumatopsyche gibbsi Statzner, 1984
- Cheumatopsyche globosa (Ulmer, 1910)
- Cheumatopsyche gordonae Lago & Harris, 1983
- Cheumatopsyche gracilis (Banks, 1899)
- Cheumatopsyche guadunica Li in Li & Dudgeon, 1988
- Cheumatopsyche guerneana Navas, 1916
- Cheumatopsyche gyra Ross, 1938
- Cheumatopsyche halima Denning, 1948
- Cheumatopsyche harwoodi Denning, 1948
- Cheumatopsyche helma Ross, 1939
- Cheumatopsyche hippolyte Malicky, 1997
- Cheumatopsyche hoenei Schmid, 1965
- Cheumatopsyche holzschuhi Malicky, 1997
- Cheumatopsyche incomptaria Mey, 1998
- Cheumatopsyche indica (Navas, 1932)
- Cheumatopsyche infascia Martynov, 1934
- Cheumatopsyche japonica (Navas, 1916)
- Cheumatopsyche jiriana Malicky, 1997
- Cheumatopsyche kebumena Malicky, 1997
- Cheumatopsyche kimminsi Marlier, 1961
- Cheumatopsyche kinlockensis Gordon, Harris & Lago, 1986
- Cheumatopsyche kirimaduwa (Schmid, 1958)
- Cheumatopsyche kissi Marlier, 1961
- Cheumatopsyche kitutuensis Marlier, 1962
- Cheumatopsyche kraepelini (Ulmer, 1905)
- Cheumatopsyche langsonina Navas, 1933
- Cheumatopsyche lasia Ross, 1938
- Cheumatopsyche lateralis (Barnard, 1934)
- Cheumatopsyche lebasi (Navas, 1932)
- Cheumatopsyche leleupi Marlier, 1961
- Cheumatopsyche leloupi Jacquemart, 1957
- Cheumatopsyche lepida (Pictet, 1834)
- Cheumatopsyche lesnei (Mosely, 1932)
- Cheumatopsyche lestoni Gibbs, 1973
- Cheumatopsyche lobata Marlier, 1943
- Cheumatopsyche logani Gordon & Smith, 1974
- Cheumatopsyche longiclasper Li in Li & Dudgeon, 1988
- Cheumatopsyche longinosnavasi Mey, 1998
- Cheumatopsyche lucida (Ulmer, 1907)
- Cheumatopsyche macentae Gibon, Guenda & Coulibaly, 1994
- Cheumatopsyche maculata (Mosely, 1934)
- Cheumatopsyche maculipennis (Ulmer, 1930)
- Cheumatopsyche madagassa (Navas, 1923)
- Cheumatopsyche marieni (Jacquemart, 1965)
- Cheumatopsyche marmorata (Navas, 1922)
- Cheumatopsyche masia (Navas, 1920)
- Cheumatopsyche mattheei Mey, 1992
- Cheumatopsyche meruana Navás, 1934
- Cheumatopsyche meyi Malicky, 1997
- Cheumatopsyche mickeli Denning, 1942
- Cheumatopsyche minuscula (Banks, 1907)
- Cheumatopsyche modica (McLachlan, 1871)
- Cheumatopsyche mollala Ross, 1941
- Cheumatopsyche morsei Gordon, 1974
- Cheumatopsyche musiana (Ulmer, 1951)
- Cheumatopsyche nathanbanksi Mey, 1998
- Cheumatopsyche naumanni Malicky, 1986
- Cheumatopsyche niasensis Malicky, 1997
- Cheumatopsyche nigrescens (Navas, 1932)
- Cheumatopsyche ningmapa Schmid, 1975
- Cheumatopsyche nubila Kimmins, 1963
- Cheumatopsyche obscurata (Ulmer, 1930)
- Cheumatopsyche obtusa (Jacquemart, 1963)
- Cheumatopsyche opposita (Banks, 1931)
- Cheumatopsyche oxa Ross, 1938
- Cheumatopsyche pallida (Banks, 1920)
- Cheumatopsyche parentum Gordon, 1974
- Cheumatopsyche pasella Ross, 1941
- Cheumatopsyche petersi Ross, Morse & Gordon, 1971
- Cheumatopsyche pettiti Banks, 1908
- Cheumatopsyche pfundsteini Statzner, 1984
- Cheumatopsyche piljanae Mey, 1999
- Cheumatopsyche pinaca Ross, 1941
- Cheumatopsyche pinula Denning, 1952
- Cheumatopsyche plutonis (Banks, 1913)
- Cheumatopsyche processuata (Martynov, 1927)
- Cheumatopsyche pulchripennis (Banks, 1939)
- Cheumatopsyche pulla (Navas, 1918)
- Cheumatopsyche pulverulenta Gibbs, 1973
- Cheumatopsyche punctata (Jacquemart, 1961)
- Cheumatopsyche reticulata (Banks, 1913)
- Cheumatopsyche rhodesiana (Jacquemart, 1963)
- Cheumatopsyche richardsoni Gordon, 1974
- Cheumatopsyche robisoni Moulton & Stewart, 1996
- Cheumatopsyche robusta (Walker, 1852)
- Cheumatopsyche roscida (Navas, 1934)
- Cheumatopsyche rossi Gordon, 1974
- Cheumatopsyche rubachi Mey, 1995
- Cheumatopsyche sagitta Kobayashi, 1987
- Cheumatopsyche saltorum Mey, 1998
- Cheumatopsyche sauteri Navas, 1933
- Cheumatopsyche schwendingeri Malicky & Chantaramongkol in Malicky, 1997
- Cheumatopsyche sessilis Marlier, 1961
- Cheumatopsyche sexfasciata (Ulmer, 1904)
- Cheumatopsyche simplex Kimmins, 1963
- Cheumatopsyche smithi Gordon, 1974
- Cheumatopsyche socia (Navas, 1927)
- Cheumatopsyche sordida (Hagen, 1861)
- Cheumatopsyche speciosa (Banks, 1904)
- Cheumatopsyche spinifera (Jacquemart, 1967)
- Cheumatopsyche spinosa Schmid, 1959
- Cheumatopsyche stenocyta (Navas, 1932)
- Cheumatopsyche stigma Kimmins, 1955
- Cheumatopsyche striata (Jacquemart, 1959)
- Cheumatopsyche suffusa (Navas, 1932)
- Cheumatopsyche surgens Li & Tian, 1990
- Cheumatopsyche taipeiana Kobayashi, 1987
- Cheumatopsyche tectifera Marlier, 1959
- Cheumatopsyche telensis Malicky, 1997
- Cheumatopsyche temburonga Malicky, 1997
- Cheumatopsyche tenerrima Marlier, 1961
- Cheumatopsyche thaba Mosely, 1948
- Cheumatopsyche thomasseti (Ulmer, 1931)
- Cheumatopsyche tienmuiaca Schmid, 1965
- Cheumatopsyche tincta (Navas, 1932)
- Cheumatopsyche tinjar (Kimmins, 1955)
- Cheumatopsyche tokunagai (Tsuda, 1940)
- Cheumatopsyche tournii Gibon, Guenda & Coulibaly, 1994
- Cheumatopsyche tramota Malicky & Chantaramongkol in Malicky, 1997
- Cheumatopsyche transmutata Mey, 1998
- Cheumatopsyche triangularis (Ulmer, 1931)
- Cheumatopsyche trifascia Li in Li & Dudgeon, 1988
- Cheumatopsyche trifida (Mosely, 1935)
- Cheumatopsyche trilari Malicky & Chantaramongkol in Malicky, 1997
- Cheumatopsyche truncata Martynov, 1935
- Cheumatopsyche uchidai Kobayashi, 1987
- Cheumatopsyche uenoi (Tsuda, 1941)
- Cheumatopsyche ulmeri (Navas, 1933)
- Cheumatopsyche unicalcarata Mey, 1992
- Cheumatopsyche urema Mosely, 1936
- Cheumatopsyche vala Malicky, 1992
- Cheumatopsyche vannotei Gordon, 1974
- Cheumatopsyche varia (Kimmins, 1955)
- Cheumatopsyche ventricosa Li & Dudgeon, 1988
- Cheumatopsyche villosa (Navas, 1934)
- Cheumatopsyche virginica Denning, 1949
- Cheumatopsyche wabasha Denning, 1948
- Cheumatopsyche wrighti Ross, 1947
- Cheumatopsyche wulaiana (Kobayashi, 1987)
