= Orthopsyche thomasi =

Conservation status
- Not Threatened (NZ TCS)

Scientific classification
- Kingdom: Animalia
- Phylum: Arthropoda
- Clade: Pancrustacea
- Class: Insecta
- Order: Trichoptera
- Family: Hydropsychidae
- Genus: Orthopsyche
- Species: O. thomasi

Binomial name
- Orthopsyche thomasi (Wise, 1962)

Synonyms
- Hydropsyche thomasi Wise, 1962

Species of caddisfly

Orthopsyche thomasi is a species of caddisfly belonging to the family Hydropsychidae. The species was first described by Keith Arthur John Wise in 1962, and is endemic to New Zealand.

== Taxonomy ==
The species was identified by Wise in 1962 as Hydropsyche thomasi, based on a specimen collected by a light trap in Titirangi, Auckland, in 1953. In 1976, Alex G. McFarlane identified the genus Orthopsyche, placing the species within it. Many taxonomic references such as the New Zealand Threat Classification System refer to the species as Hydropsyche thomasi.

== Description ==
Wise's original text (the type description) reads as follows:

A species close to H. fimbriata McL. but smaller. Anterior wing with pale irrorations giving a unicolorous ochreous effect in general view. Without the heavier irrorations and yellow patch on terminal setae of H. fimbriata McL. Length of anterior wing, ♂ ♂, 9–10 mm (0.35–0.39 in). (Length of anterior wing of 27 H. fimbriata ♂ ♂, taken in the same light trap, 10.5–12 mm (0.41–0.47 in).). Genitalia, ♂ (fig. 2). Usual elevation of the dorsal surface of the ninth segment is inconspicuous. Dorsal plate, from the side, with upper angle a rounded protuberance with marginal setae, lower angle produced obliquely downwards in a long point apically, a short inwardly turned point basal to this not visible in side view. Side pieces of ninth segment moderately produced. Penis with apex divided into an upper and lower portion, the upper portion divided by a vertical slit into two rounded lateral pieces. The lower portion of the apex, from beneath, is seen as a wide plate with strongly spinose distal margin, lateral angles not produced basally. Inferior appendages two-jointed, approximately equal in length. The apical joint is narrowed beyond half-way both dorsally and ventrally (less so laterally) resulting in a long apical finger..

== Distribution and habitat ==
The species is endemic to New Zealand, found in the northern half of the North Island.
