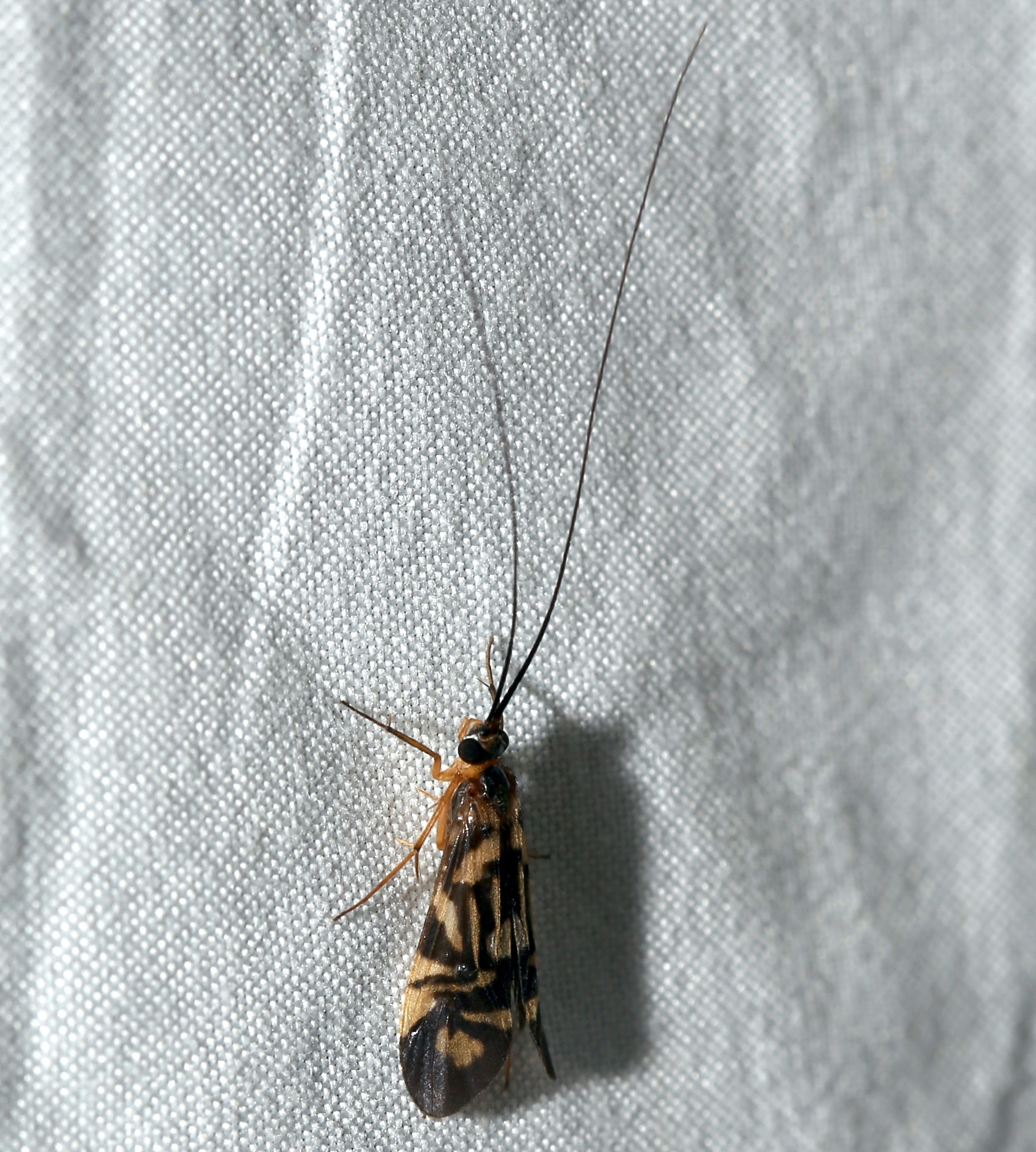

Scientific classification
- Kingdom: Animalia
- Phylum: Arthropoda
- Clade: Pancrustacea
- Class: Insecta
- Order: Trichoptera
- Family: Hydropsychidae
- Genus: Macrostemum
- Species: M. carolina

Binomial name
- Macrostemum carolina (Banks, 1909)

Synonyms
- Macronema carolina Banks, 1909

= Macrostemum carolina =

Species of insect

Macrostemum carolina is a species of netspinning caddisfly in the family Hydropsychidae. It is found in North America.
