= Homoplectra doringa =

Scientific classification
- Kingdom: Animalia
- Phylum: Arthropoda
- Clade: Pancrustacea
- Class: Insecta
- Order: Trichoptera
- Family: Hydropsychidae
- Genus: Homoplectra
- Species: H. doringa

Binomial name
- Homoplectra doringa (Milne, 1936)

Synonyms
- Aphropsyche aprilis Ross, 1941; Diplectrona doringa Milne, 1936

Species of caddisfly

Homoplectra doringa is a species of netspinning caddisfly in the family Hydropsychidae. It is found in North America.
