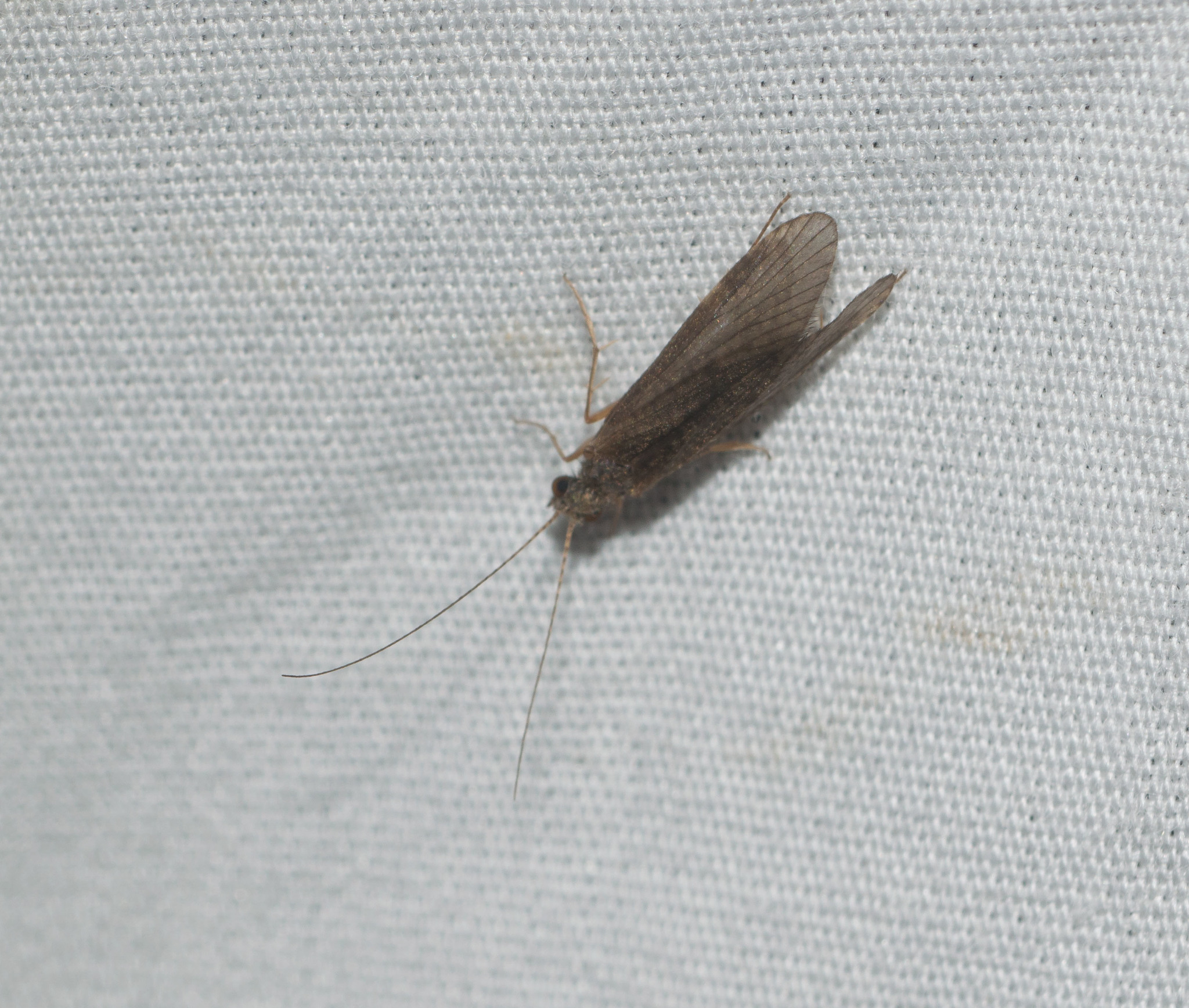

Scientific classification
- Kingdom: Animalia
- Phylum: Arthropoda
- Clade: Pancrustacea
- Class: Insecta
- Order: Trichoptera
- Family: Hydropsychidae
- Genus: Cheumatopsyche
- Species: C. analis

Binomial name
- Cheumatopsyche analis (Banks, 1903)

= Cheumatopsyche analis =

Species of caddisfly

Cheumatopsyche analis is a species of netspinning caddisfly in the family Hydropsychidae.
