= Leptonema (caddisfly) =

Scientific classification
- Kingdom: Animalia
- Phylum: Arthropoda
- Clade: Pancrustacea
- Class: Insecta
- Order: Trichoptera
- Family: Hydropsychidae
- Subfamily: Macronematinae
- Genus: Leptonema; Guérin-Méneville, 1843

Type species
- Leptonema pallida Guérin-Méneville, 1843

Genus of caddisflies

Leptonema is a genus of netspinning caddisflies in the family Hydropsychidae. There are over 100 described species in Leptonema.

== Species ==
These species belong to the genus Leptonema:

- Leptonema acutum Mosely, 1933^{i c g}
- Leptonema agraphum (Kolenati), 1859^{i c g}
- Leptonema albovirens (Walker), 1852^{i c g}
- etc.

Data sources: i=ITIS, c=Catalogue of Life, g=GBIF,
