= Cheumatopsyche campyla =

Scientific classification
- Kingdom: Animalia
- Phylum: Arthropoda
- Clade: Pancrustacea
- Class: Insecta
- Order: Trichoptera
- Family: Hydropsychidae
- Genus: Cheumatopsyche
- Species: C. campyla

Binomial name
- Cheumatopsyche campyla Ross, 1938

Species of caddisfly

Cheumatopsyche campyla is a species of netspinning caddisfly in the family Hydropsychidae. It is found in North America.
