= Smicridea signata =

Scientific classification
- Kingdom: Animalia
- Phylum: Arthropoda
- Clade: Pancrustacea
- Class: Insecta
- Order: Trichoptera
- Family: Hydropsychidae
- Genus: Smicridea
- Species: S. signata

Binomial name
- Smicridea signata (Banks, 1903)

Species of caddisfly

Smicridea signata is a species of netspinning caddisfly in the family Hydropsychidae. It is found in North America.
