= Diplectrona japonica =

Scientific classification
- Kingdom: Animalia
- Phylum: Arthropoda
- Clade: Pancrustacea
- Class: Insecta
- Order: Trichoptera
- Family: Hydropsychidae
- Genus: Diplectrona
- Species: D. japonica

Binomial name
- Diplectrona japonica (Banks, 1906)

Species of caddisfly

Diplectrona japonica is a species of caddisfly from the Hydropsychidae family. The scientific name of this species was first published in 1906 by Banks. This species can be found within the Palearctic realm.
