= Orthopsyche =

Scientific classification
- Kingdom: Animalia
- Phylum: Arthropoda
- Clade: Pancrustacea
- Class: Insecta
- Order: Trichoptera
- Family: Hydropsychidae
- Subfamily: Hydropsychinae
- Genus: Orthopsyche; McFarlane, 1976

Species
- See text

Genus of insects

Orthopsyche is a genus of caddisflies belonging to the family Hydropsychidae. The genus was described by Alex G. McFarlane in 1976. Species of Orthopsyche can be found in New Zealand and New Caledonia.

== Taxonomy ==
Orthopsyche was first proposed as a genus in 1976 by Alex G. McFarlane, including two species previously identified as Hydropsyche. McFarlane named Orthopsyche fimbriata (McLachlan, 1862) as the type species. Phylogenetic analysis indicates that Orthopsyche forms a clade with the genus Aoteapsyche.

In 2006, János Oláh, Kjell Arne Johanson and Peter C. Barnard greatly expanded Orthopsyche, by synonymising Abacaria Mosely 1941, and Caledopsyche Kimmins 1953, and describing 29 new species. In 2008, Oláh and Johanson further proposed that Aoteapsyche was a symonym of Orthopsyche.

== Distribution ==
The genus is found in New Zealand and New Caledonia.

== Species ==
- Orthopsyche fimbriata (McLachlan, 1862)
- Orthopsyche thomasi (Wise, 1962)
