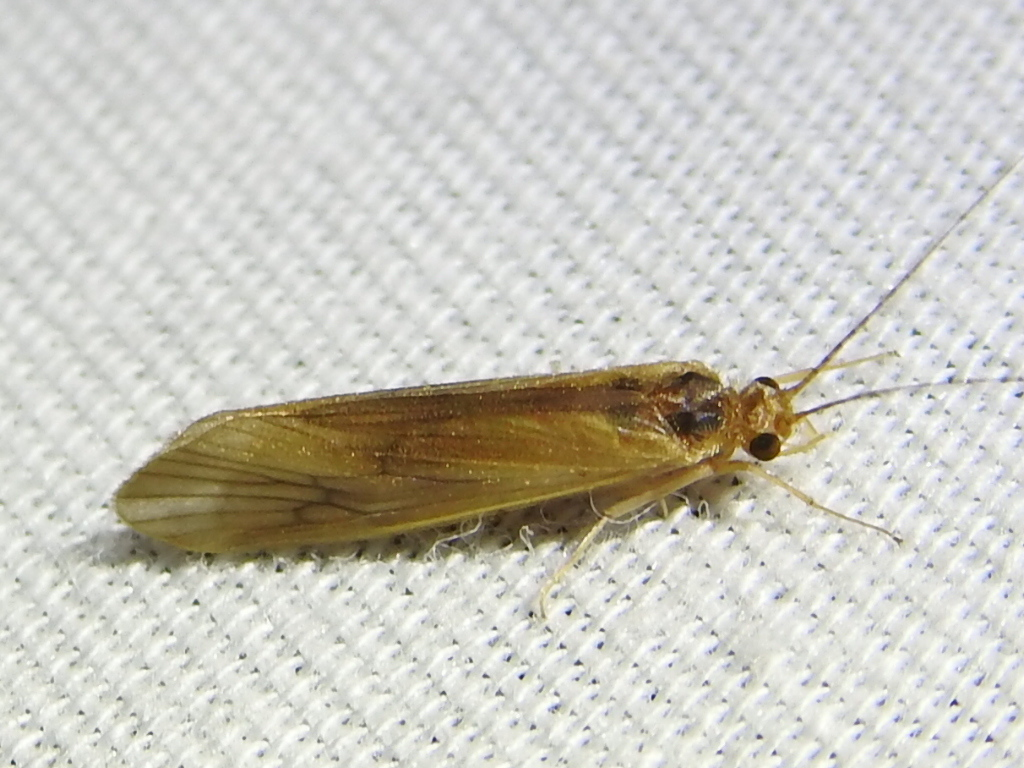

Scientific classification
- Kingdom: Animalia
- Phylum: Arthropoda
- Clade: Pancrustacea
- Class: Insecta
- Order: Trichoptera
- Family: Hydropsychidae
- Genus: Potamyia
- Species: P. flava

Binomial name
- Potamyia flava (Hagen, 1861)

Synonyms
- Hydropsyche kansensis Banks, 1905; Macronema flavum Hagen, 1861; Potamyia kansensis (Banks, 1905)

= Potamyia flava =

Species of caddisfly

Potamyia flava is a species of netspinning caddisfly in the family Hydropsychidae. It is found in North America.
