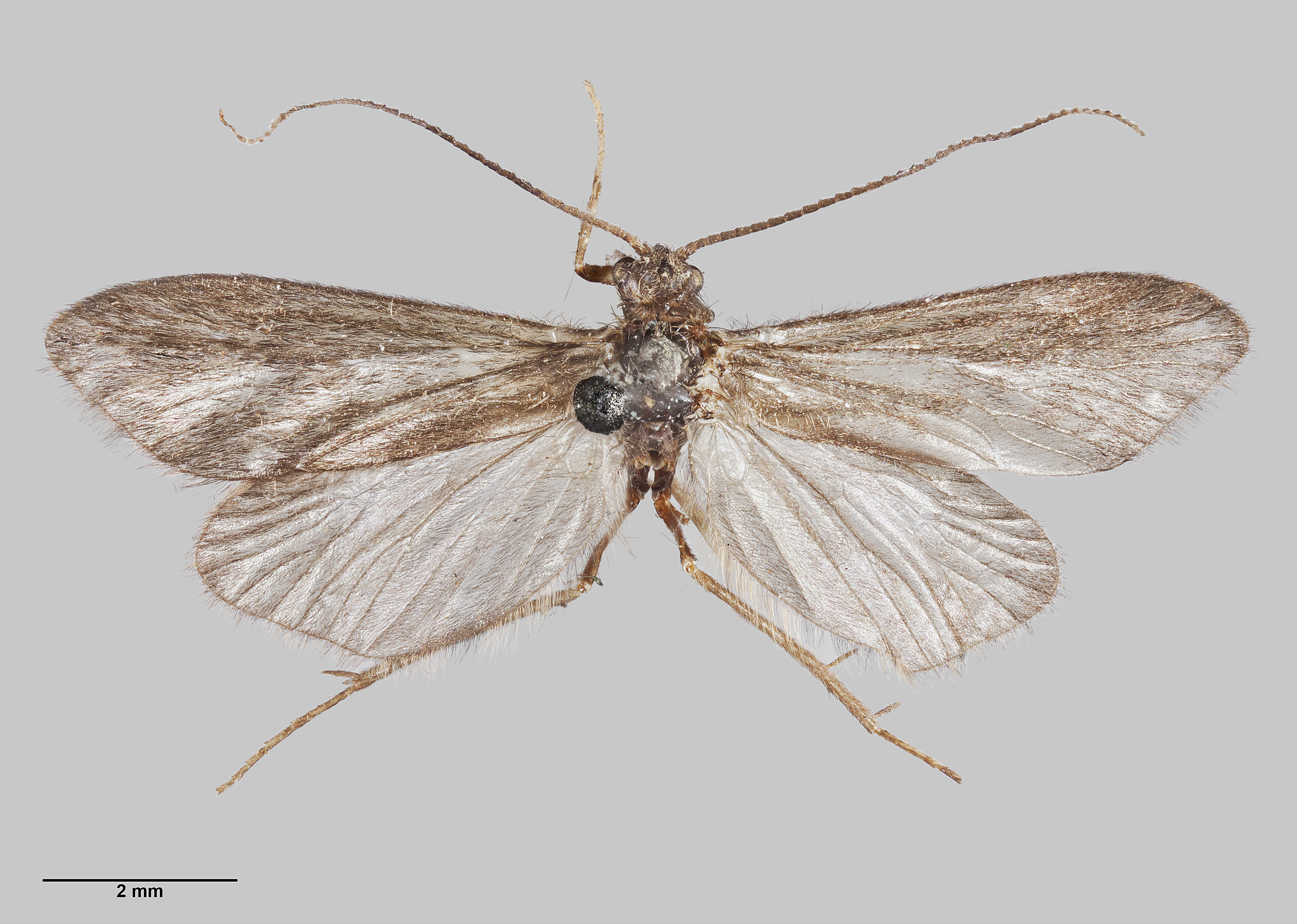
- Diplectrona bulla

Scientific classification
- Kingdom: Animalia
- Phylum: Arthropoda
- Clade: Pancrustacea
- Class: Insecta
- Order: Trichoptera
- Family: Hydropsychidae
- Subfamily: Diplectroninae
- Genus: Diplectrona; Westwood, 1840

Diversity
- at least 100 species

= Diplectrona =

Genus of caddisflies

Diplectrona is a genus of netspinning caddisflies in the family Hydropsychidae. There are a large number of species within Diplectrona. Catalogue of Life and Integrated Taxonomic Information System accept 87 species, while others, including Global Biodiversity Information Facility, accept more than 100 described species.

== Species ==
Catalogue of Life and ITIS accept the following 87 species within Diplectrona:

- Diplectrona adusta Mey, 1990
- Diplectrona aiensis Kobayashi, 1987
- Diplectrona albofasciata (Ulmer, 1913)
- Diplectrona albomarginata Ulmer, 1907
- Diplectrona angusta Banks, 1939
- Diplectrona aspersa (Ulmer, 1905)
- Diplectrona atra McLachlan, 1878
- Diplectrona aurovittata (Ulmer, 1906)
- Diplectrona bidens Ulmer, 1930
- Diplectrona brunnea (Betten, 1909)
- Diplectrona bulla Wise, 1958
- Diplectrona burha Schmid, 1961
- Diplectrona californica Banks, 1914
- Diplectrona candidana Mey, 1998
- Diplectrona castanea Kimmins in Mosely & Kimmins, 1953
- Diplectrona chiapensis Flint, 1967
- Diplectrona cinctipennis (Banks, 1913)
- Diplectrona clara Navas, 1917
- Diplectrona clarella Ulmer, 1932
- Diplectrona cognata Kimmins in Mosely & Kimmins, 1953
- Diplectrona colorata Mey, 1990
- Diplectrona dulitensis Kimmins, 1955
- Diplectrona elongata (Banks, 1931)
- Diplectrona exquisita Banks, 1937
- Diplectrona extrema (Banks, 1920)
- Diplectrona fansipanella Mey, 1998
- Diplectrona fasciata (Ulmer, 1905)
- Diplectrona fasciatella Ulmer, 1932
- Diplectrona felix McLachlan, 1878
- Diplectrona fissilinea Mey, 1999
- Diplectrona flavospilota Mey, 1998
- Diplectrona fonti Navas, 1924
- Diplectrona fulvofusca Kimmins, 1955
- Diplectrona furcata Hwang, 1958
- Diplectrona gombak Olah, 1993
- Diplectrona hystricosa Neboiss, 1978
- Diplectrona inermis (Banks, 1939)
- Diplectrona japonica (Banks, 1906)
- Diplectrona joannisi Navás, 1932
- Diplectrona juliarum Grigorenko & Ivanov, 1991
- Diplectrona kibuneana Tsuda, 1940
- Diplectrona kirimaduhela Schmid, 1958
- Diplectrona lieftincki Ulmer, 1951
- Diplectrona likiangana Schmid, 1959
- Diplectrona luteocapitis Mey, 1990
- Diplectrona lyella Neboiss, 1977
- Diplectrona maculata Kimmins, 1955
- Diplectrona mafulua Kimmins, 1962
- Diplectrona magna Mosely, 1930
- Diplectrona maligna {{small|(Hagen, 1859)
- Diplectrona marginata (Betten, 1909)
- Diplectrona marianae Reeves in Reeves & Paysen, 1999
- Diplectrona melli Ulmer, 1932
- Diplectrona meridionalis (Hagen, 1864)
- Diplectrona metaqui Ross, 1970
- Diplectrona modesta Banks, 1908
- Diplectrona moralesi Schmid, 1952
- Diplectrona obscura Ulmer, 1930
- Diplectrona oculata (Banks, 1931)
- Diplectrona orientalis (Betten, 1909)
- Diplectrona pallida (Banks, 1931)
- Diplectrona papilionacea (Hagen, 1859)
- Diplectrona papuana Kumanski, 1979
- Diplectrona pseudofasciata Ulmer, 1909
- Diplectrona ripollensis Tobias, 1972
- Diplectrona robusta Martynov, 1934
- Diplectrona rossi Kimmins in Mosely & Kimmins, 1953
- Diplectrona salai Navás, 1932
- Diplectrona salakensis Ulmer, 1951
- Diplectrona sanguana Kimmins, 1964
- Diplectrona satana Mosely in Mosely & Kimmins, 1953
- Diplectrona scabrosa Banks, 1937
- Diplectrona solitaria Bueno-Soria, 1986
- Diplectrona spinata (Banks, 1939)
- Diplectrona subtriangulata Kumanski, 1979
- Diplectrona suensoni Ulmer, 1932
- Diplectrona tamdaophila Mey, 1998
- Diplectrona tasmanica Jacquemart, 1965
- Diplectrona tenebricosa (Ulmer, 1907)
- Diplectrona tohokuensis Kobayashi, 1973
- Diplectrona triangulata Sykora, 1967
- Diplectrona tricolor Banks, 1937
- Diplectrona trifasciata (Banks, 1924)
- Diplectrona ulmeri Martynov, 1935
- Diplectrona ungaranica Ulmer, 1951
- Diplectrona vairya Schmid, 1959
- Diplectrona zealandensis Mosely in Mosely & Kimmins, 1953
