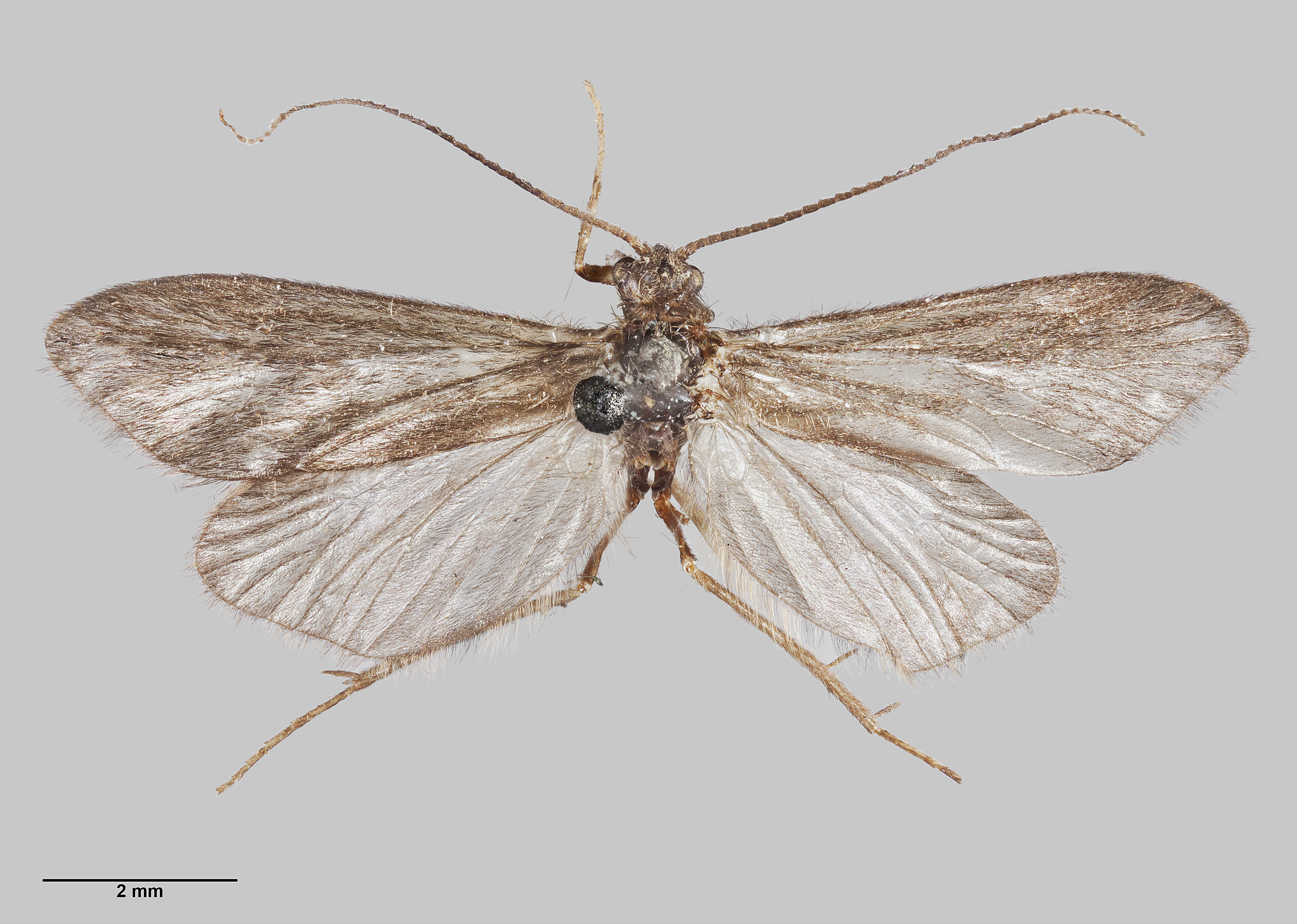
- Male holotype specimen held at the Auckland War Memorial Museum

Conservation status
- Not Threatened (NZ TCS)

Scientific classification
- Kingdom: Animalia
- Phylum: Arthropoda
- Clade: Pancrustacea
- Class: Insecta
- Order: Trichoptera
- Family: Hydropsychidae
- Genus: Diplectrona
- Species: D. bulla

Binomial name
- Diplectrona bulla Wise, 1958

= Diplectrona bulla =

Species of caddisfly

Diplectrona bulla is a species of caddisfly belonging to the order Hydropsychidae. The species was first described by Keith Arthur John Wise in 1958, and is endemic to New Zealand.

== Description ==
Wise's original text (the type description) reads as follows:

HEAD black with two large, lighter-coloured warts posteriorly. PALPI and LEGS pale castaneous. ANTENNAE blackish, serrate along inner margin. ANTERIOR WING blackish, uniform in colour; two cross-veins present between costa and sub-costa. Length of anterior wing, 7 mm (0.28 in).

Wise noted that the species was morphologically similar to Diplectrona zealandensis, but could be distinguished by the complex genitalia of D. bulla.

== Distribution and habitat ==
The species is endemic to New Zealand, known to sporadically occur on the North Island.
