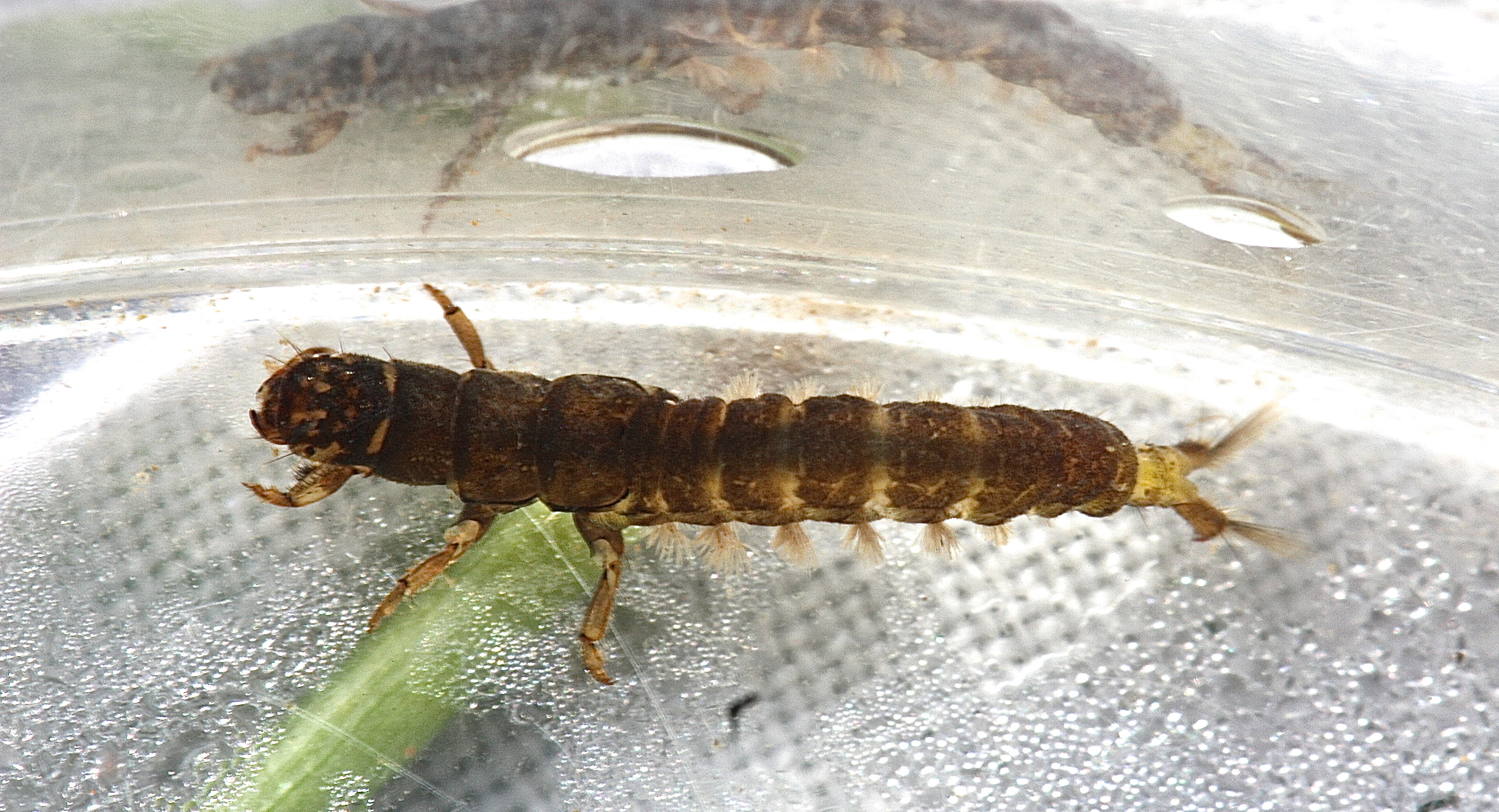

Scientific classification
- Kingdom: Animalia
- Phylum: Arthropoda
- Clade: Pancrustacea
- Class: Insecta
- Order: Trichoptera
- Family: Hydropsychidae
- Genus: Hydropsyche
- Species: H. venularis

Binomial name
- Hydropsyche venularis Banks, 1914

= Hydropsyche venularis =

Species of caddisfly

Hydropsyche venularis is a species of netspinning caddisflies in the family Hydropsychidae. It is found in North America.
