= Diplectroninae =

Scientific classification
- Kingdom: Animalia
- Phylum: Arthropoda
- Clade: Pancrustacea
- Class: Insecta
- Order: Trichoptera
- Family: Hydropsychidae
- Subfamily: Diplectroninae; Ulmer, 1951

Genera
- Diplectrona; Diplectronella; Diplex; Homoplectra; Oropsyche; Sciadorus

Subfamily of caddisflies

Diplectroninae is a subfamily level taxon consisting of net-spinning caddisflies. The subfamily was described by Georg Ulmer in 1951.
