= Cheumatopsyche ela =

Scientific classification
- Kingdom: Animalia
- Phylum: Arthropoda
- Clade: Pancrustacea
- Class: Insecta
- Order: Trichoptera
- Family: Hydropsychidae
- Genus: Cheumatopsyche
- Species: C. ela

Binomial name
- Cheumatopsyche ela Denning, 1942

Species of caddisfly

Cheumatopsyche ela is a species of netspinning caddisfly in the family Hydropsychidae. It is found in North America.
