= Homoplectra =

Scientific classification
- Kingdom: Animalia
- Phylum: Arthropoda
- Clade: Pancrustacea
- Class: Insecta
- Order: Trichoptera
- Family: Hydropsychidae
- Subfamily: Diplectroninae
- Genus: Homoplectra; Ross, 1938

Synonyms
- Aphropsyche Ross, 1941

Genus of caddisflies

Homoplectra is a genus of netspinning caddisflies in the family Hydropsychidae. There are about 11 described species in Homoplectra.

== Species ==
These 11 species belong to the genus Homoplectra:

- Homoplectra alseae Ross, 1938
- Homoplectra doringa (Milne, 1936)
- Homoplectra flinti Weaver, 1985
- Homoplectra luchia Denning, 1966
- Homoplectra monticola (Flint, 1965)
- Homoplectra nigripennis (Banks, 1911)
- Homoplectra norada Denning, 1975
- Homoplectra oaklandensis (Ling, 1938)
- Homoplectra schuhi Denning, 1965
- Homoplectra shasta Denning, 1949
- Homoplectra spora Denning, 1952
