= Hydropsyche californica =

Scientific classification
- Kingdom: Animalia
- Phylum: Arthropoda
- Clade: Pancrustacea
- Class: Insecta
- Order: Trichoptera
- Family: Hydropsychidae
- Genus: Hydropsyche
- Species: H. californica

Binomial name
- Hydropsyche californica Banks, 1899

Species of caddisfly

Hydropsyche californica is a species of netspinning caddisfly in the family Hydropsychidae. It is found in North America.
