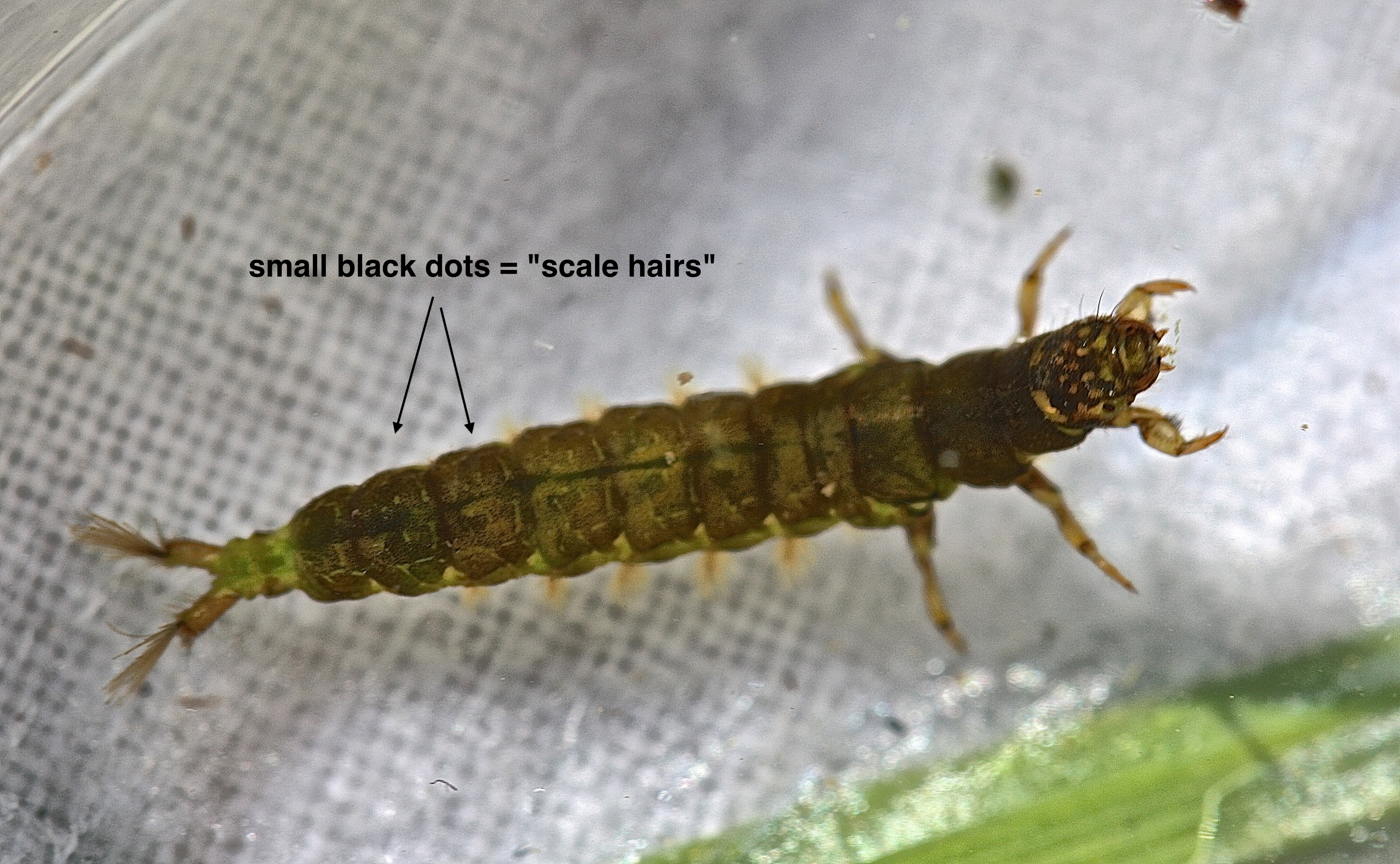

Scientific classification
- Kingdom: Animalia
- Phylum: Arthropoda
- Clade: Pancrustacea
- Class: Insecta
- Order: Trichoptera
- Family: Hydropsychidae
- Genus: Hydropsyche
- Species: H. rossi

Binomial name
- Hydropsyche rossi Flint, Voshell & Parker, 1979

= Hydropsyche rossi =

Species of caddisfly

Hydropsyche rossi is a species of netspinning caddisfly in the family Hydropsychidae. It is found in North America.
