= Hydronema =

Scientific classification
- Kingdom: Animalia
- Phylum: Arthropoda
- Clade: Pancrustacea
- Class: Insecta
- Order: Trichoptera
- Family: Hydropsychidae
- Subfamily: Hydropsychinae
- Genus: Hydronema; Martynov, 1914

Genus of caddisflies

Hydronema is a genus of netspinning caddisflies in the family Hydropsychidae.
