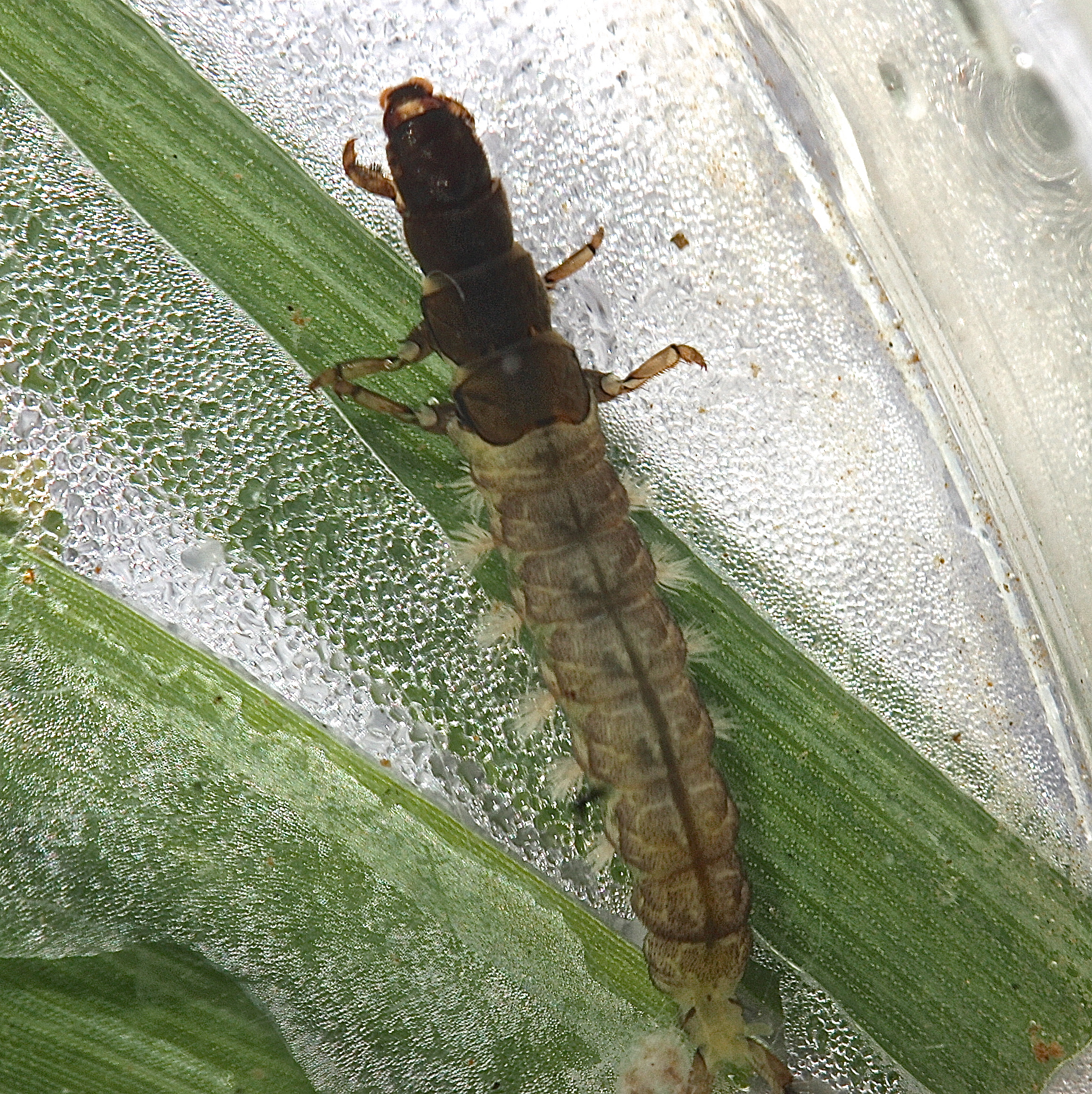
- Common netspinner

Scientific classification
- Kingdom: Animalia
- Phylum: Arthropoda
- Clade: Pancrustacea
- Class: Insecta
- Order: Trichoptera
- Family: Hydropsychidae
- Genus: Hydropsyche
- Species: H. betteni

Binomial name
- Hydropsyche betteni Ross, 1938

= Hydropsyche betteni =

Species of insect in North America

Hydropsyche betteni, the Common Netspinner, is a species of netspinning caddisfly in the family Hydropsychidae. It is found in North America.
