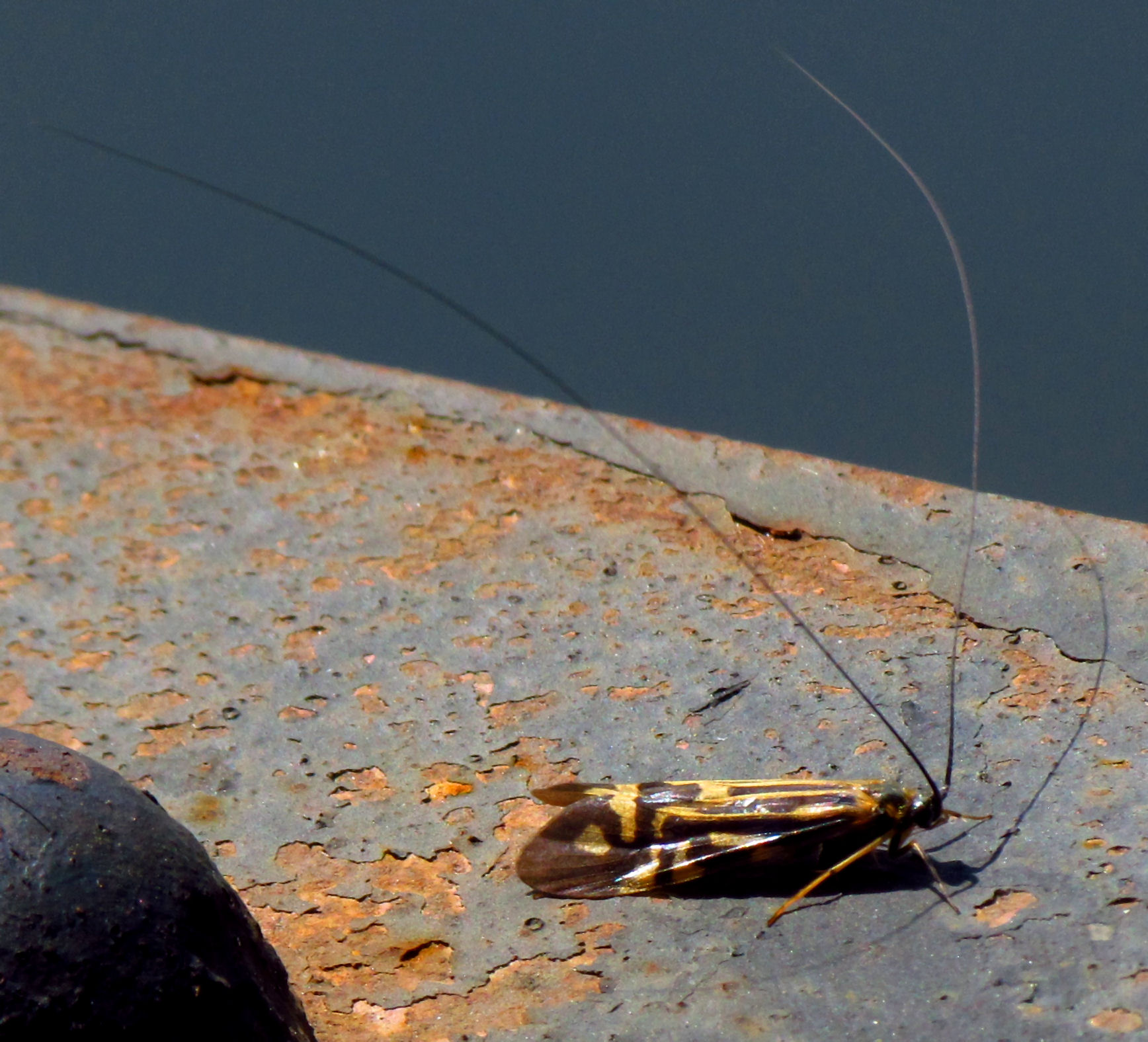
- Zebra caddis (Macrostemum zebratum)

Scientific classification
- Kingdom: Animalia
- Phylum: Arthropoda
- Clade: Pancrustacea
- Class: Insecta
- Order: Trichoptera
- Family: Hydropsychidae
- Subfamily: Macronematinae; Ulmer, 1905

Tribes
- Macronematini; Oestropsini

= Macronematinae =

Subfamily of caddisflies

Macronematinae is a subfamily of net-spinning caddisflies whose larvae use webs to catch prey drifting in flowing waterways.

Genera in Macronematinae include the following:

- Leptonema
- Leptopsyche
- Macronema
- Macrostemum
