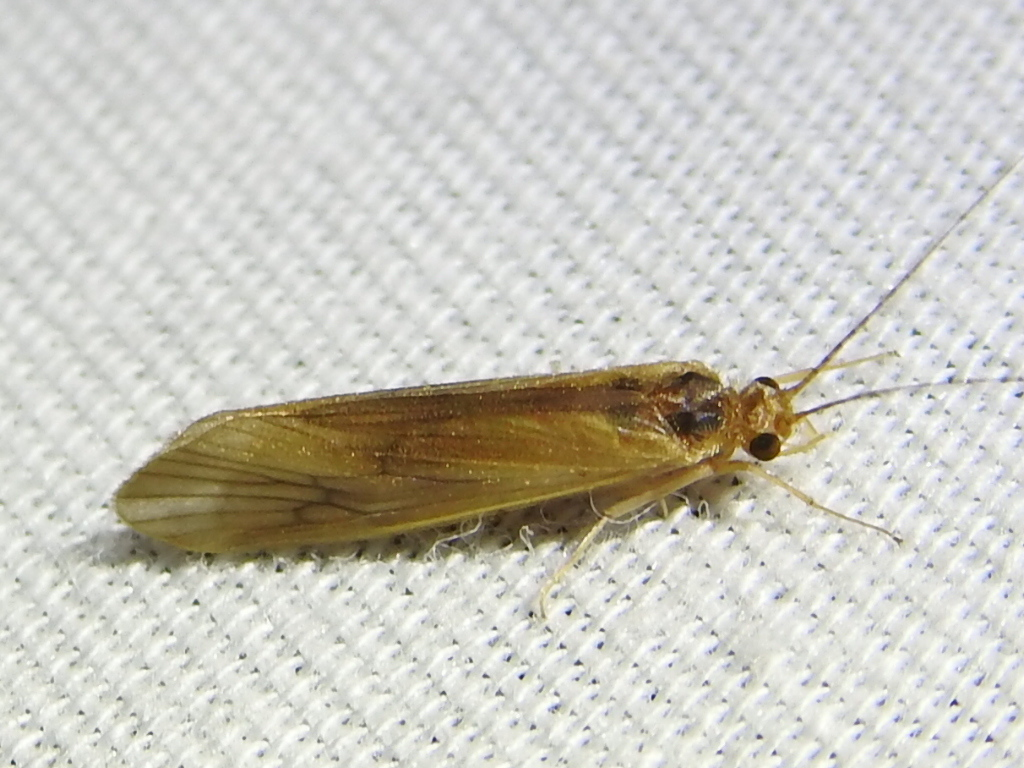
- Potamyia flava

Scientific classification
- Kingdom: Animalia
- Phylum: Arthropoda
- Clade: Pancrustacea
- Class: Insecta
- Order: Trichoptera
- Family: Hydropsychidae
- Subfamily: Hydropsychinae
- Genus: Potamyia; Banks, 1900

= Potamyia =

Genus of caddisflies

Potamyia is a genus of netspinning caddisflies in the family Hydropsychidae. There are more than 20 described species in the genus Potamyia.

== Species ==
These 27 species belong to the genus Potamyia:

- Potamyia arachne Malicky, 1998
- Potamyia aureipennis (Ulmer, 1930)
- Potamyia baenzigeri Malicky & Chantaramongkol in Malicky, 1997
- Potamyia bicornis Li & Tian in Tian, Yang & Li, 1996
- Potamyia chinensis (Ulmer, 1915)
- Potamyia czekanovskii (Martynov, 1910)
- Potamyia daphne Malicky, 1998
- Potamyia dentifera (Ulmer, 1930)
- Potamyia dryope Malicky & Thani in Malicky, 2000
- Potamyia echigoensis (Tsuda, 1949)
- Potamyia flava (Hagen, 1861)
- Potamyia flavata (Banks, 1934)
- Potamyia horvati Malicky & Chantaramongkol in Malicky, 1997
- Potamyia huberti Malicky, 1997
- Potamyia jinhongensis Li & Tian in Tian, Yang & Li, 1996
- Potamyia nikalandugola (Schmid, 1958)
- Potamyia panakeia Malicky & Chantaramongkol in Malicky, 1997
- Potamyia peitho Malicky & Chantaramongkol in Malicky, 1997
- Potamyia periboia Malicky & Chantaramongkol in Malicky, 1997
- Potamyia phaidra Malicky & Chantaramongkol in Malicky, 1997
- Potamyia proboscida Li & Tian in Tian, Yang & Li, 1996
- Potamyia renatae Malicky, 1997
- Potamyia siveci Malicky, 1997
- Potamyia straminea (McLachlan, 1875)
- Potamyia trilobata Ulmer, 1932
- Potamyia yunnanica (Schmid, 1959)
- † Potamyia nitida Ulmer, 1912
