= Macronema =

Macronema may refer to:

- Macronema (caddisfly), a genus of insects in the family Hydropsychidae
- Macronema (plant), a genus of plants in the family Asteraceae
