= Smicridea dispar =

Scientific classification
- Kingdom: Animalia
- Phylum: Arthropoda
- Clade: Pancrustacea
- Class: Insecta
- Order: Trichoptera
- Family: Hydropsychidae
- Genus: Smicridea
- Species: S. dispar

Binomial name
- Smicridea dispar (Banks, 1905)

Synonyms
- Polycentropus dispar Banks, 1905; Smicridea utico Ross, 1947

Species of caddisfly

Smicridea dispar is a species of netspinning caddisfly in the family Hydropsychidae. It is found in North America.
