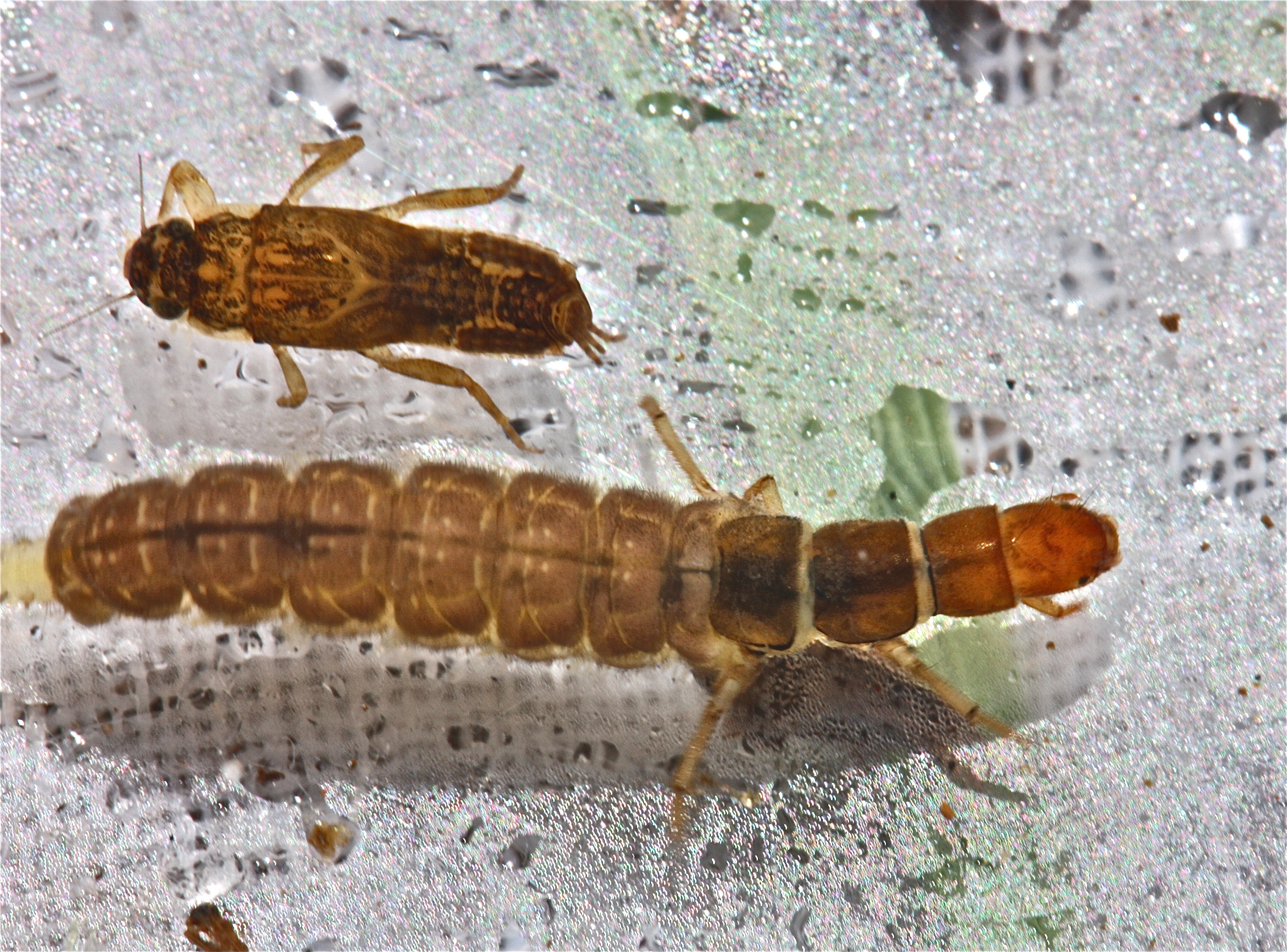

Scientific classification
- Kingdom: Animalia
- Phylum: Arthropoda
- Clade: Pancrustacea
- Class: Insecta
- Order: Trichoptera
- Family: Hydropsychidae
- Genus: Diplectrona
- Species: D. modesta

Binomial name
- Diplectrona modesta Banks, 1908

= Diplectrona modesta =

Species of caddisfly

Diplectrona modesta is a species of netspinning caddisfly in the family Hydropsychidae. It is found in North America.
