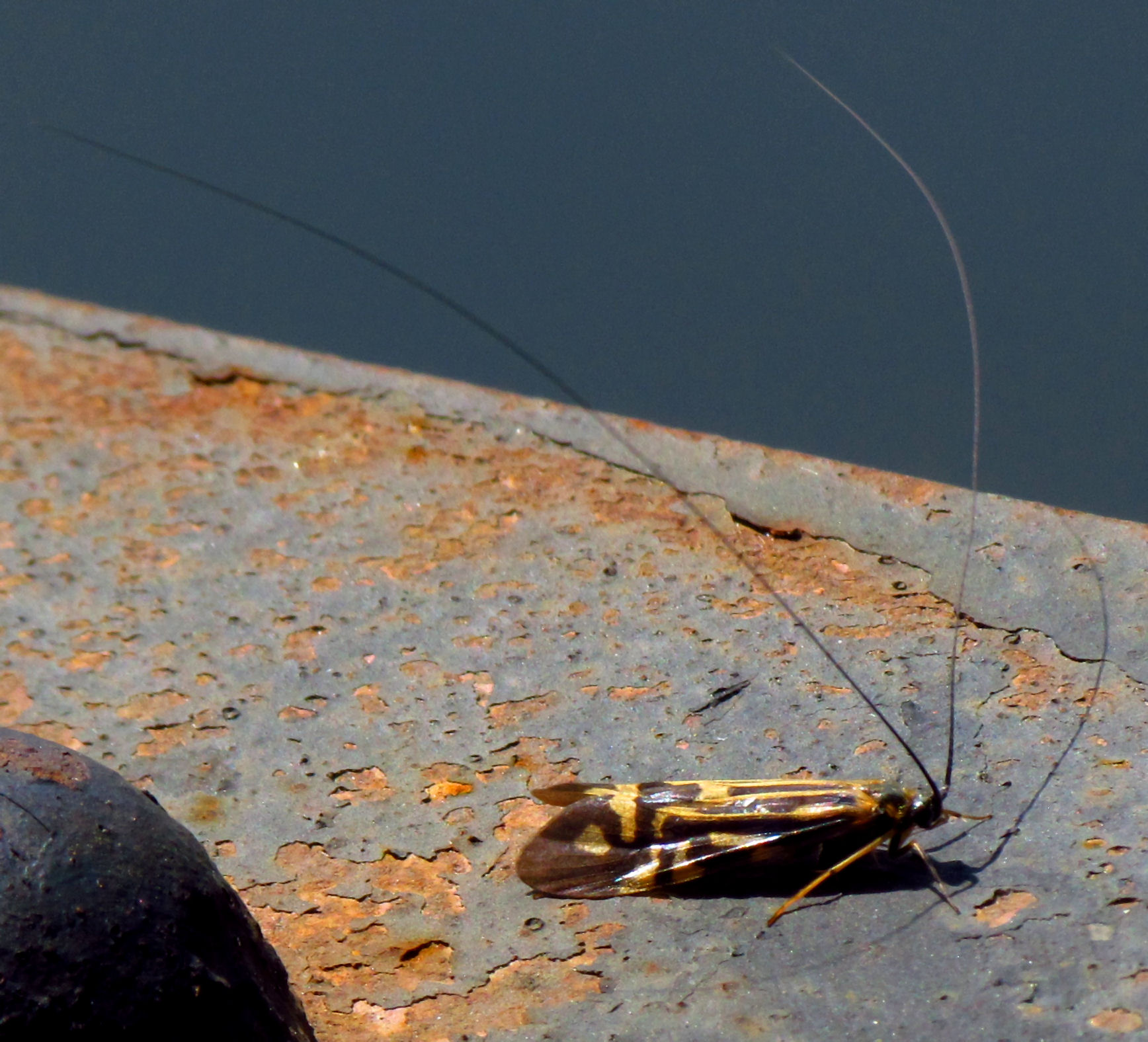
- Macrostemum zebratum

Scientific classification
- Kingdom: Animalia
- Phylum: Arthropoda
- Clade: Pancrustacea
- Class: Insecta
- Order: Trichoptera
- Family: Hydropsychidae
- Subfamily: Macronematinae
- Genus: Macrostemum; Kolenati, 1859

Type species
- Hydropsyche hyalina F.J. Pictet.

= Macrostemum =

Genus of caddisflies

Macrostemum is a genus of netspinning caddisflies in the family Hydropsychidae. There are at least 90 described species in Macrostemum.

== Species ==
These 98 species belong to the genus Macrostemum:

- Macrostemum adpictum (Navas, 1934)^{i c g}
- Macrostemum albardanum (Banks, 1931)^{i c g}
- Macrostemum alienum (Ulmer, 1907)^{i c g}
- Macrostemum arcuatum (Erichson, 1848)^{i c g}
- Macrostemum auriferum Neboiss, 1984^{i c g}
- Macrostemum austrovicinorum Mey, 1989^{i c g}
- Macrostemum bellerophon Malicky & Chantaramongkol in Malicky, 1998^{i c g}
- Macrostemum bellum (Banks, 1916)^{i c g}
- Macrostemum bifenestratum (Navas, 1929)^{i c g}
- Macrostemum boettcheri (Ulmer, 1930)^{i c g}
- Macrostemum bouvieri (Navas, 1923)^{i c g}
- Macrostemum brasiliense (Fischer, 1970)^{i c g}
- Macrostemum braueri (Banks, 1924)^{i c g}
- Macrostemum bravoii^{g}
- Macrostemum brisi (Navás, 1930)^{i c g}
- Macrostemum caliptera (Banks, 1931)^{i c g}
- Macrostemum capense (Walker, 1852)^{i c g}
- Macrostemum carolina (Banks, 1909)^{i c g b}
- Macrostemum centrotum (Navas, 1917)^{i c g}
- Macrostemum ciliatum (Ulmer, 1926)^{i c g}
- Macrostemum croceum (Navas, 1924)^{i c g}
- Macrostemum dairiana Malicky, 1998^{i c g}
- Macrostemum diagramma (McLachlan, 1871)^{i c g}
- Macrostemum digramma McLachlan, 1871^{g}
- Macrostemum dione Malicky & Chantaramongkol in Malicky, 1998^{i c g}
- Macrostemum distinctum (Ulmer, 1912)^{i c g}
- Macrostemum distinguendum (Ulmer, 1905)^{i c g}
- Macrostemum dohrni (Ulmer, 1905)^{i c}
- Macrostemum dulce (McLachlan, 1866)^{i c g}
- Macrostemum eleanora (Banks, 1938)^{i c g}
- Macrostemum elegans (Ulmer, 1926)^{i c g}
- Macrostemum erichsoni (Banks, 1920)^{i c g}
- Macrostemum erigone Malicky, 1998^{i c g}
- Macrostemum ethelda (Banks, 1939)^{i c g}
- Macrostemum fastosum (Walker, 1852)^{i c g}
- Macrostemum fenestratum (Albarda in Veth, 1881)^{i c g}
- Macrostemum floridum (Navas, 1929)^{i c g}
- Macrostemum formosicolum (Matsumura, 1931)^{i c g}
- Macrostemum fulvescens (Martynov, 1935)^{i c g}
- Macrostemum fuscum (Martynov, 1935)^{i c g}
- Macrostemum giganteum (Martynov, 1935)^{i c g}
- Macrostemum gigapunctatus Li & Tian, 1990^{i c g}
- Macrostemum graphicum (Navas, 1934)^{i c g}
- Macrostemum hestia Malicky & Chantaramongkol in Malicky, 1998^{i c g}
- Macrostemum hospitum (McLachlan, 1862)^{i c g}
- Macrostemum hyalinum (Pictet, 1836)^{i c g}
- Macrostemum indistinctum (Banks, 1911)^{i c g}
- Macrostemum inscriptum (Walker, 1852)^{i c g}
- Macrostemum lacroixi (Navas, 1923)^{i c g}
- Macrostemum lautum (McLachlan, 1862)^{i c g}
- Macrostemum loriai (Navás, 1930)^{i c g}
- Macrostemum luteipes (Kimmins, 1955)^{i c g}
- Macrostemum madagascariense (Ulmer, 1905)^{i c}
- Macrostemum marpessa Malicky, 1998^{i c g}
- Macrostemum midas Malicky & Chantaramongkol in Malicky, 1998^{i c g}
- Macrostemum multifarium (Walker, 1852)^{i c g}
- Macrostemum nebulosum (Hagen, 1858)^{i c g}
- Macrostemum negrense Flint, 1978^{i c g}
- Macrostemum nigrum^{g}
- Macrostemum obliquum (Hagen, 1858)^{i c g}
- Macrostemum obscurum (Banks, 1920)^{i c g}
- Macrostemum okinawanum (Matsumura, 1931)^{i c g}
- Macrostemum opulentum (Ulmer, 1905)^{i c g}
- Macrostemum pallidipennis (Martynov, 1935)^{i c}
- Macrostemum pallipes (Banks, 1931)^{i c g}
- Macrostemum par (Navás, 1930)^{i c g}
- Macrostemum paradiatum Li & Tian, 1991^{i c g}
- Macrostemum placidum (Navas, 1935)^{i c g}
- Macrostemum pseudodistinctum (Marlier, 1965)^{i c g}
- Macrostemum pseudoneura (Brauer, 1865)^{i c g}
- Macrostemum pulcherrimum (Walker, 1852)^{i c g}
- Macrostemum punctatum (Betten, 1909)^{i c g}
- Macrostemum quinquefasciatum (Martynov, 1935)^{i c g}
- Macrostemum quinquepunctatum (Matsumura, 1931)^{i c g}
- Macrostemum radiatum (McLachlan, 1872)^{i c g}
- Macrostemum santaeritae (Ulmer, 1905)^{i c g}
- Macrostemum saowapa Chantaramongkol & Malicky, 1986^{i c g}
- Macrostemum saundersii (McLachlan, 1866)^{i c g}
- Macrostemum scriptum (Rambur, 1842)^{i c g}
- Macrostemum sepultum (Hagen, 1859)^{i c g}
- Macrostemum similior (Banks, 1931)^{i c g}
- Macrostemum spectabilis (Banks, 1931)^{i c g}
- Macrostemum splendens (Banks, 1931)^{i c g}
- Macrostemum splendidum (Hagen, 1858)^{i c g}
- Macrostemum subaequale (Banks, 1920)^{i c g}
- Macrostemum surinamense (Flint, 1974)^{i c g}
- Macrostemum thomasi Mey, 1993^{i c g}
- Macrostemum tonkinensis (Mosely, 1934)^{i c g}
- Macrostemum transversum (Walker, 1852)^{i c g}
- Macrostemum trifasciatum (Banks, 1934)^{i c g}
- Macrostemum trigramma (Navas, 1916)^{i c g}
- Macrostemum trilineatum (Jacquemart, 1961)^{i c g}
- Macrostemum triste (Navas, 1916)^{i c g}
- Macrostemum tuberosum (Ulmer, 1905)^{i c g}
- Macrostemum ulmeri (Banks, 1913)^{i c}
- Macrostemum uncatum Li & Tian, 1991^{i c g}
- Macrostemum wallacei (McLachlan, 1866)^{i c g}
- Macrostemum zebratum (Hagen, 1861)^{i c g b} (zebra caddisfly)

Data sources: i=ITIS, c=Catalogue of Life, g=GBIF, b=Bugguide.net
