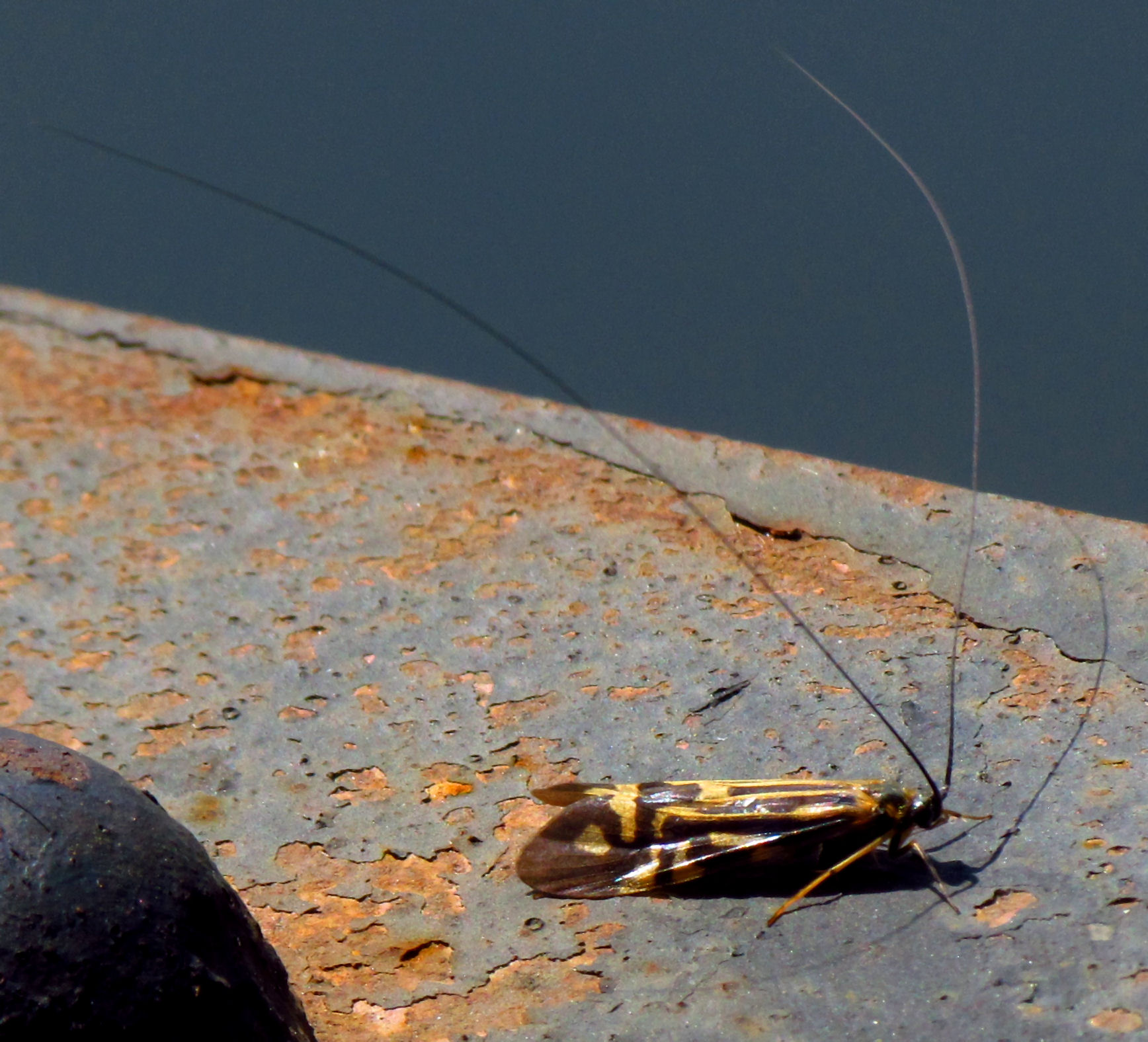

Scientific classification
- Kingdom: Animalia
- Phylum: Arthropoda
- Clade: Pancrustacea
- Class: Insecta
- Order: Trichoptera
- Family: Hydropsychidae
- Genus: Macrostemum
- Species: M. zebratum

Binomial name
- Macrostemum zebratum (Hagen, 1861)

Synonyms
- Macronema zebratum Hagen, 1861

= Macrostemum zebratum =

Species of caddisfly

Macrostemum zebratum, the zebra caddisfly, is a species of netspinning caddisfly in the family Hydropsychidae. It is found in North America.
