= Smicrideinae =

Scientific classification
- Kingdom: Animalia
- Phylum: Arthropoda
- Clade: Pancrustacea
- Class: Insecta
- Order: Trichoptera
- Family: Hydropsychidae
- Subfamily: Smicrideinae; Flint, 1974

Genera
- Asmicridea; Smicridea; Smicrophylax

Subfamily of caddisflies

Smicrideinae is one of five subfamilies in the family Hydropsychidae of net-spinning caddisflies.
