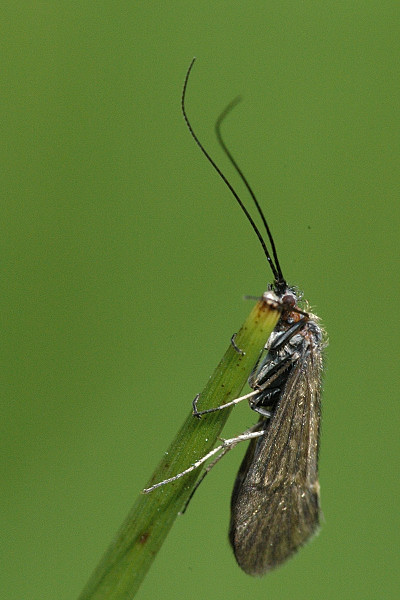
- Hydropsyche pellucidula

Scientific classification
- Kingdom: Animalia
- Phylum: Arthropoda
- Clade: Pancrustacea
- Class: Insecta
- Order: Trichoptera
- Family: Hydropsychidae
- Subfamily: Hydropsychinae; Curtis, 1835

Genera
- Abacaria; Aoteapsyche; Austropsyche; Caledopsyche; Calosopsyche; Ceratopsyche; Cheumatopsyche; Herbertorossia; Hydatomanicus; Hydatopsyche; Hydromanicus; Hydronema; Hydropsyche; Mexipsyche; Orthopsyche; Plectropsyche; Potamyia; Sciops; Streptopsyche; Symphitopsyche

= Hydropsychinae =

Subfamily of caddisflies

Hydropsychinae is a subfamily level taxon consisting of net-spinning caddisflies.
