= Macronema (caddisfly) =

Scientific classification
- Kingdom: Animalia
- Phylum: Arthropoda
- Clade: Pancrustacea
- Class: Insecta
- Order: Trichoptera
- Family: Hydropsychidae
- Subfamily: Macronematinae
- Genus: Macronema; Pictet 1836

Type species
- Macronema lineatum Pictet 1836

Genus of caddisflies

Macronema is a genus of netspinning caddisflies in the family Hydropsychidae. There around 30 described species in Macronema.

== Species ==
These species belong to the genus Macronema:

- Macronema amazonense Flint, 1978^{i c g}
- Macronema argentilineatum Ulmer, 1905^{i c g}
- Macronema bicolor Ulmer, 1905^{i c g}
- etc.

Data sources: i=ITIS, c=Catalogue of Life, g=GBIF,
