= Smicridea =

Scientific classification
- Kingdom: Animalia
- Phylum: Arthropoda
- Clade: Pancrustacea
- Class: Insecta
- Order: Trichoptera
- Family: Hydropsychidae
- Subfamily: Smicrideinae
- Genus: Smicridea; McLachlan, 1871

Subgenera
- Smicridea (Rhyacophylax) Mueller, 1879; Smicridea (Smicridea) McLachlan, 1871

Diversity
- at least 256 species

Genus of caddisflies

Smicridea is a genus of netspinning caddisflies in the family Hydropsychidae. Currently there are 255 described species in Smicridea.

== See also ==
- List of Smicridea species
