= Georg Ulmer =

German entomologist (1877–1963)

Georg Ulmer (5 March 1877, in Hamburg – 15 January 1963, in Hamburg) was a German entomologist who specialized in research of Trichoptera (caddisflies) and Ephemeroptera (mayflies).

In 1899 he qualified as an instructor, and up until 1934 he worked as a schoolteacher in Hamburg. In 1912 he received an honorary doctorate from the University of Basel, largely based on his work involving caddisflies of Baltic amber. In 1952 he became an honorary member of the Royal Entomological Society.

Throughout his career, he conducted extensive studies involving the faunistics, biology, systematics, and taxonomy of caddisflies and mayflies. He conducted research on species native to Germany and also specimens collected by others from worldwide locations. From 1900 up until his death he was the author of 175 scientific publications. In 1964 his insect collection was donated to the Zoological Museum of Hamburg.

He is credited with describing 381 living and 129 fossil species of Trichoptera, as well as 111 species of Ephemeroptera. He is also the taxonomic authority of the mayfly families Oligoneuriidae (1914), Ecdyonuridae (1920), and Siphlonuridae (1920). The Leptophlebiidae genera Ulmeritoides, Ulmeritus, and Ulmerophlebia commemorate his name.

== Partial listing of works ==
- Über die Metamorphose der Trichopteren, 1903 – On the metamorphosis of Trichoptera.
- Hamburgische Elb-Untersuchung 5. Trichopteren, 1903 – Hamburg-Elbe investigations: Trichoptera, Volume 5.
- Zur Trichopteren-Fauna von Hessen, 1903 – Trichoptera of Hesse.
- Zur Trichopteren-Fauna von Thüringen und Harz, 1903 – Trichoptera of Thuringia and the Harz.
- Zur Fauna des Eppendorfer Moores bei Hamburg, 1903 – Fauna of the Eppendorfer Moor near Hamburg.
- Über westafrikanische Trichopteren, 1904 – On West African Trichoptera.
- Über die von Herrn Prof. Yngve Sjöstedt in Kamerun gesammelten Trichopteren, 1904 – On Trichoptera collected by Bror Yngve Sjöstedt in Kamerun.
- Trichopteren, 1904 – Trichoptera.
- Ephemeriden, 1904 – Ephemeroptera.
- Trichopteren aus Java, 1905 – On Trichoptera of Java.
- Über die geographische Verbreitung der Trichopteren, 1905 – On the distribution of Trichoptera.
- Übersicht über die bisher bekannten Larven europäischer Trichopteren, 1906 – Overview on the hitherto known larvae of European Trichoptera.
- Japanische Trichopteren, 1908 – Japanese Trichoptera.
- Ephemeriden von Madagaskar und den Comoren, 1909 – Ephemeroptera of Madagascar and the Comoros.
- Unsere wasserinsekten, 1911 – On water insects.
- Die trichopteren des baltischen bernsteins, 1912 – Trichoptera found in Baltic amber.
- Ephemeriden aus Java, gesammelt von Edw. Jacobson, 1913 – Ephemeroptera of Java, collected by Edw. Jacobson.
