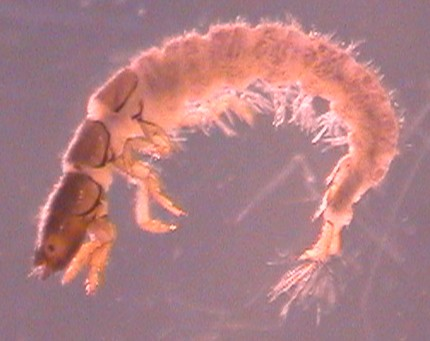
- Cheumatopsyche larva

Scientific classification
- Kingdom: Animalia
- Phylum: Arthropoda
- Clade: Pancrustacea
- Class: Insecta
- Order: Trichoptera
- Family: Hydropsychidae
- Subfamily: Hydropsychinae
- Genus: Cheumatopsyche; Wallengren, 1891

Type species
- Hydropsyche lepida FJ Pictet

= Cheumatopsyche =

Genus of caddisflies

Cheumatopsyche is a genus of netspinning caddisflies in the family Hydropsychidae. There are at least 240 described species in Cheumatopsyche.

== See also ==
- List of Cheumatopsyche species
