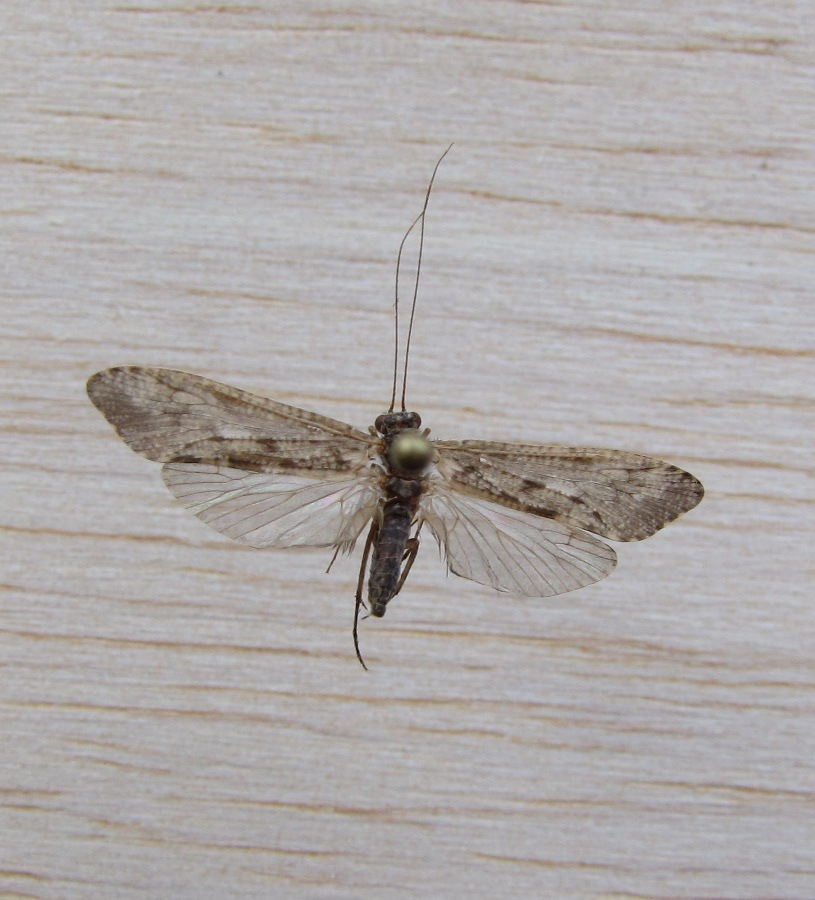
- Hydropsyche siltalai

Scientific classification
- Kingdom: Animalia
- Phylum: Arthropoda
- Clade: Pancrustacea
- Class: Insecta
- Order: Trichoptera
- Family: Hydropsychidae
- Subfamily: Hydropsychinae
- Genus: Hydropsyche

= Hydropsyche =

Genus of caddisflies

Hydropsyche is a genus of netspinning caddisflies in the family Hydropsychidae. There are at least 260 described species in the genus Hydropsyche.

Taxonomic note:

- Type species: Hydropsyche cinerea FJ Pictet (selected by HH Ross, 1944, BullIllinois Nat Hist Surv 23: 86).

== See also ==
- List of Hydropsyche species
