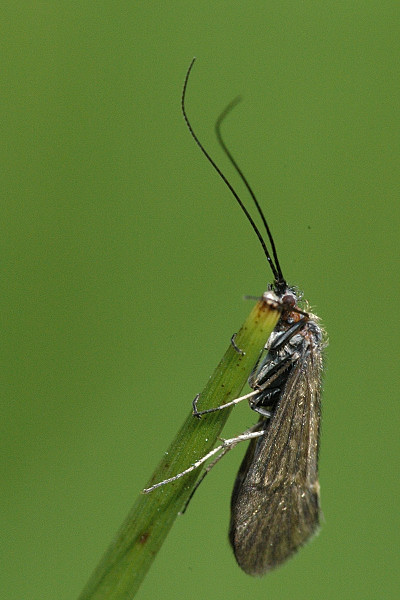
- Hydropsyche pellucidula

Scientific classification
- Kingdom: Animalia
- Phylum: Arthropoda
- Clade: Pancrustacea
- Class: Insecta
- Order: Trichoptera
- Suborder: Annulipalpia
- Superfamily: Hydropsychoidea
- Family: Hydropsychidae; Curtis, 1835

Subfamilies
- Diplectroninae; Hydropsychinae; Macronematinae; Smicrideinae

= Hydropsychidae =

Family of caddisflies

The Hydropsychidae are a family-level taxon consisting of net-spinning caddisflies. Hydropsychids are common among much of the world's streams, and a few species occupy the shorelines of freshwater lakes. Larvae of the hydropsychids construct nets at the open ends of their dwellings which are responsible for their "net-spinning caddisfly" common name.

== Larvae ==
The hydropsychid larval stage, like most Trichoptera larvae, is spent entirely in fresh water. They construct dwellings known as "retreats", which are fixed to the sides of rocks. These retreats are typically composed of collected plant and mineral fragments. At the large open end of their retreats, hydropsychids spin a net or sieve made of fine silk, similar to the silk produced by the larval form of the Lepidoptera (caterpillars), one of their close relatives. These nets catch algae, detritus, and smaller invertebrates. Different genera spin nets of different mesh sizes and shapes depending on what food type they are targeting. Because of this technique of food collection, hydropsychids require flowing water to ensnare items of food into their nets.

Net and larva of Cheumatopsyche sp. pulled from a stream

An in-stream view of a net constructed by Cheumatopsche sp. larva

Hydropsychids are capable of performing a defensive stridulation in their larval stages. Individuals stridulate to dissuade other hydropsychids from attempts to steal their retreats. When individuals abandon, or become dislodged from, their retreats, they must build or seize a new retreat. "Home-less" hydropsychids will sometimes search out retreats currently occupied by another member of their species. This can result in a confrontation between individuals, each vying for ownership of an established retreat. Stridulating warns foes that a retreat is occupied and attempting to enter is unwise. This noise is made by running their femurs across ridges on the undersides of their heads. It is still unclear whether this noise is also used to dissuade insect predators.

=== Anatomy ===
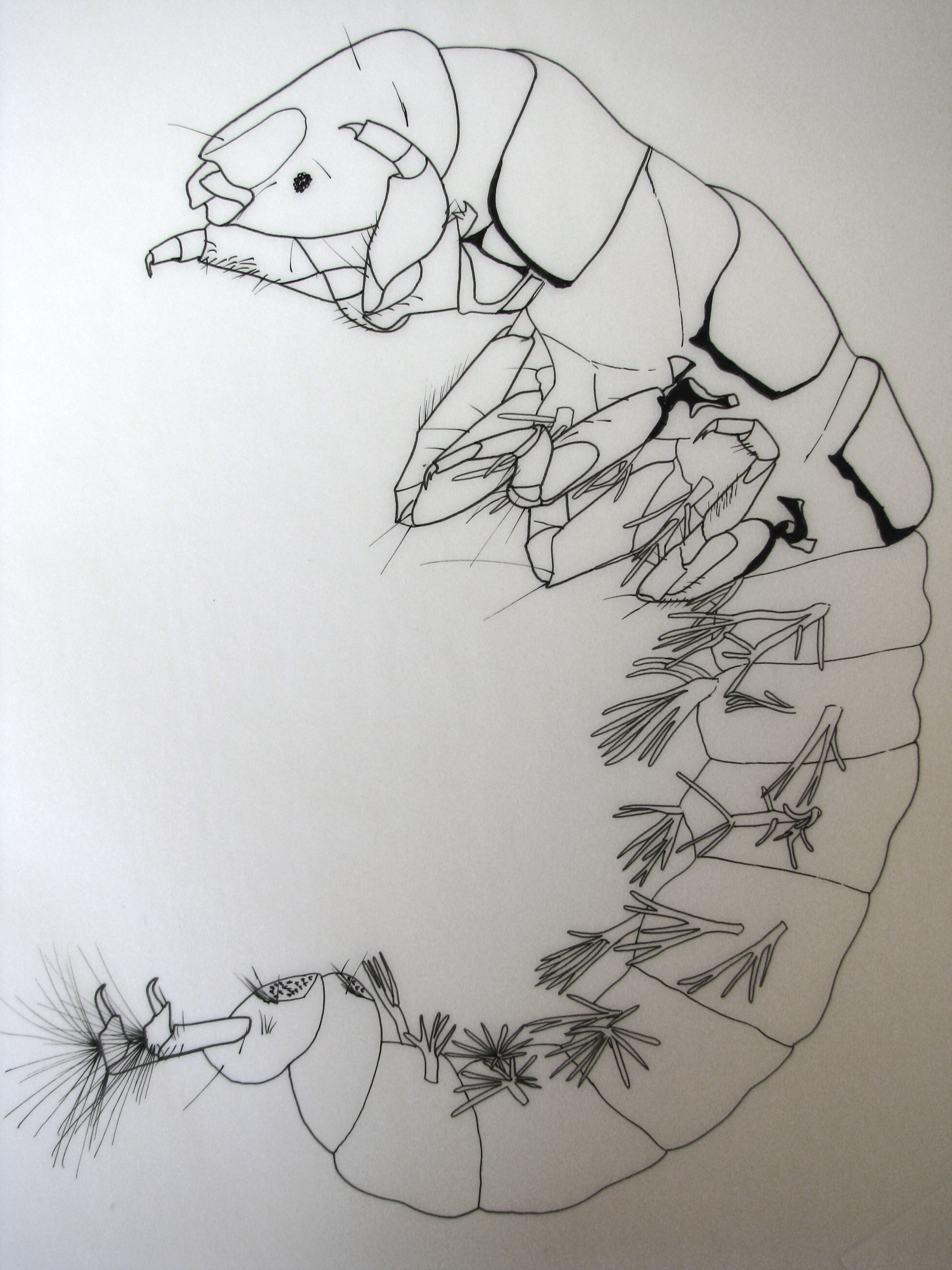
Larva of Cheumatopsyche sp.

Hydropsychid larvae are unique from most Trichoptera due to their fully scleritized dorsum. Only the Hydroptilidae family share this characteristic with the hydropsychids. This feature combined with branched gills running along ventral surface of their abdomens differentiate the hydropsychids from all other trichopterans. The hydropsychids have large anal prolegs equipped with hooks, allowing them to grasp the side of rocks in river and stream beds. Individuals are easily identified without the use of a lens by their large, curved bodies. In India four subfamilies (Arctopsychinae, Martynov 1924, Diplectroninae, Ulmer 1951, Hydropsychidae, Curtis 1835, Macronematinae, Ulmer 1905) have been reported so far which includes 15 genera and 128 species.

== Environmental indicators ==
Due to hydropsychid's presence in a wide range of freshwater environments worldwide and their very specific standards of living, hydropychid's are favored as an indicator species. Some genera, sensitive to certain contaminants or pollutants, suffer declines in growth and/or survival, while others thrive in their absence. Species like C. morosa, C. walkeri, D. modesta, Hydropsyche leonardi, and P. apicalis are found only in unpolluted streams while species like Hydropsyche bidens, H. orris, H. phalerata, H. placoda, H. simulans, and P. flava inhabit decaying or dead wood. Others species like the C. morosa (bifida form) and Hydropsyche betteni can withstand high levels of organic pollution and thrive in those conditions.The habitat range for this family encompasses a huge area in total and can found in most freshwater areas with running water worldwide. Thus, like a canary in a coal mine, researchers can examine stream hydropsychidae populations to assess stream health (see EPT or Index of biological integrity). Researchers can look at the contents of the web as well as the materials of the actual web structure to determine stream health. Hydropsychidae species will adapt the web depending on the building resource availability more so than food availability. This can help to create an environment inhabited by many different species due to the different habitat types between them. Many different species in the same area with different standards allows for a broad view of the area's available building resources as well as food types. These food types are often fine organic matter caught within their silk net attached to their retreat that can be used to assess the health of other common species within the same stream on top of being a great indicator of overall stream health and its contents.

Their presence is also often pointed to as an indicator of relative temperature depending on the densities of the various species present with some species being better suited for higher temperatures and others lower temperatures. The diverse nature of hydropsychidae sensitivities and resistances is one of the many indicators of global warming worldwide and makes them highly susceptible to the negative changes associated with global warming. Hydropsychidae species can require specific temperature ranges throughout the year that have been altered already. Overall mortality increases and less retreats are made when temperatures exceed seasonal averages. These changes have already been seen in tropical environments and are expected to become more commonplace across various environments as seasonal averages continue to rise.
