= Trichopsocus dalii =

Scientific classification
- Domain: Eukaryota
- Kingdom: Animalia
- Phylum: Arthropoda
- Class: Insecta
- Order: Psocodea
- Family: Trichopsocidae
- Genus: Trichopsocus
- Species: T. dalii

Binomial name
- Trichopsocus dalii (McLachlan, 1867)

Species of booklouse

Trichopsocus dalii is a species of Psocoptera from Trichopsocidae family that can be found in United Kingdom and Ireland. The species are green coloured.

== Habitat ==
The species feeds on beech, elder, elm, fir, hawthorn, hemlock, holm oak, ivy, oak, poplar, and sea buckthorn, yew.
