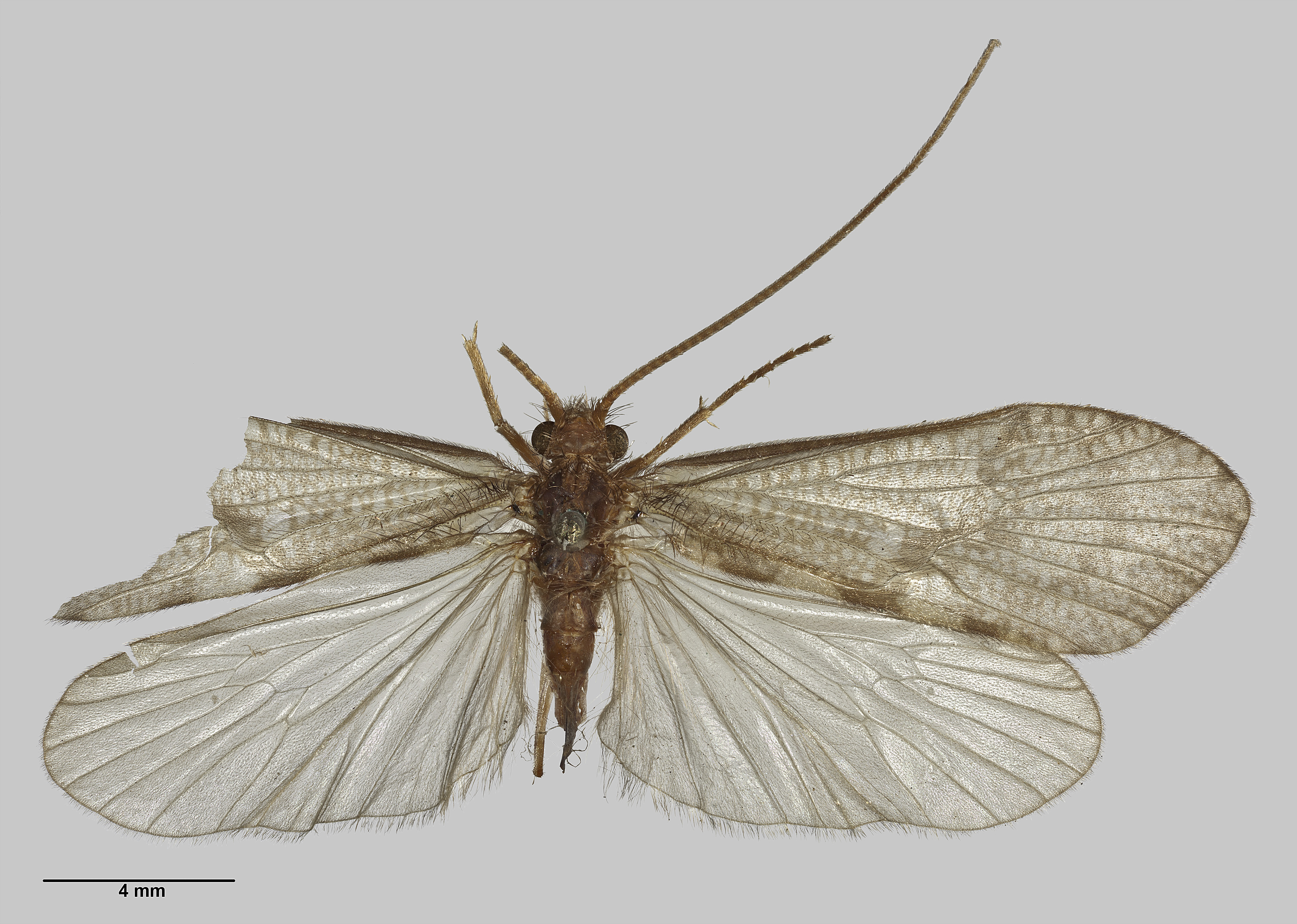
- Male holotype specimen held at Auckland War Memorial Museum

Scientific classification
- Kingdom: Animalia
- Phylum: Arthropoda
- Clade: Pancrustacea
- Class: Insecta
- Order: Trichoptera
- Family: Oeconesidae
- Genus: Oeconesus
- Species: O. lobatus

Binomial name
- Oeconesus lobatus Wise, 1958

= Oeconesus lobatus =

Species of caddisfly

Oeconesus lobatus is a species of caddisfly belonging to the family Hydrobiosidae. The species was first described by Keith Arthur John Wise in 1958, and is endemic to New Zealand.

== Taxonomy ==
The species was identified by Wise in 1958, based on a specimen collected from Raurimu in 1919 by C. E. Clarke. Some sources such as Ward (1999) consider O. lobatus to be a junior synonym of O. maori.

== Description ==
Wise's original text (the type description) reads as follows:

Length of anterior wing, 13 mm (0.51 in). Abdomen♂. Fifth abdominal segment with a pair of lateral processes. Genitalia♂. Dorsal margin of ninth segment produced in two large rounded lobes with a slight transverse ridge across their bases. Beneath each lobe is a narrower process directed slightly upwards. Upper penis-cover large, produced upwards, narrowly excised to form two forks lying parallel and very close together, these forks being truncate in dorsal view. Inferior appendages three-jointed, a stout basal joint with two terminal joints arising from its inner surface, one membranous and finger-shaped, the other more strongly chitinised, sharply excised ventrally towards the apex, directed inwards, and with a small tooth at apex. Penis membranous, expanded at apex with a chitinised process on each side pointing latero-ventrally, and with some chitinisation at the opening of the ejaculatory duct.

== Distribution and habitat ==
The species is endemic to New Zealand.
