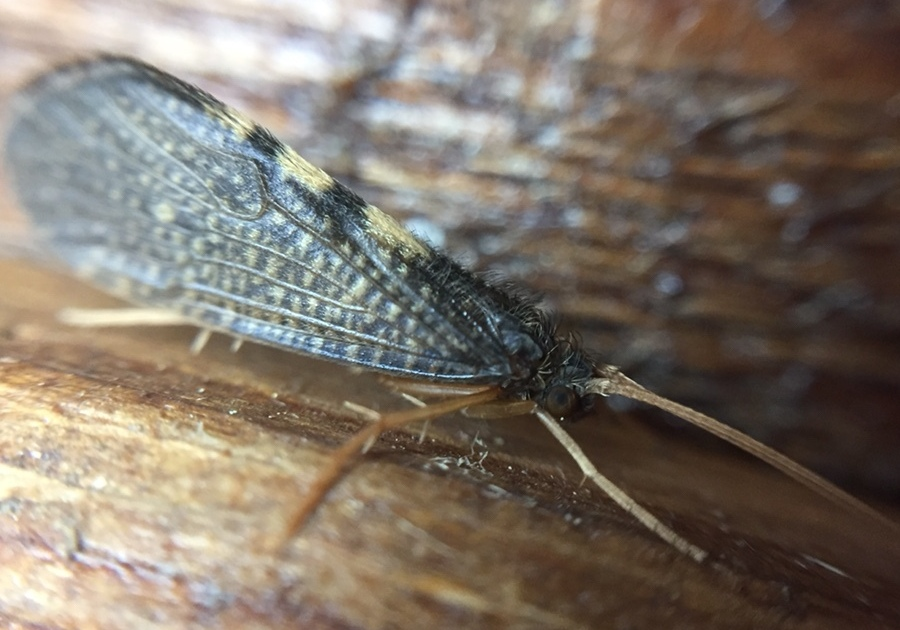
- Pseudoeconesus bistirpis seen on the Auckland isthmus

Conservation status
- Not Threatened (NZ TCS)

Scientific classification
- Kingdom: Animalia
- Phylum: Arthropoda
- Clade: Pancrustacea
- Class: Insecta
- Order: Trichoptera
- Family: Oeconesidae
- Genus: Pseudoeconesus
- Species: P. bistirpis

Binomial name
- Pseudoeconesus bistirpis Wise, 1958

Synonyms
- Pseudoeconesus tristirpis Wise, 1958

= Pseudoeconesus bistirpis =

Species of caddisfly

Pseudoeconesus bistirpis is a species of caddisfly belonging to the family Hydrobiosidae. The species was first described by Keith Arthur John Wise in 1958, and is endemic to New Zealand.

== Taxonomy ==
The species was identified by Wise in 1958, based on a specimen collected from the Tongariro area of the North Island Volcanic Plateau in 1930 by Alfred Philpott. Pseudoeconesus tristirpis, which was identified in the same paper by Wise, became a junior synonym of Pseudoeconesus bistirpis in 1997.

== Description ==
P. bistirpis is brownish-yellow in colour, with rows of minute spots freckled on its forewings.

Wise's original text (the type description) reads as follows:

Testaceous; ANTERIOR WINGS closely irrorated with rows of almost colourless spots between the veins. WING VENATION. Apical forks of anterior wing sessile. Apical forks 1 and 3 of posterior wing stalked. Sc and R_{1} of posterior wing folded together for most of their lengths. Abdomen♂. Fifth abdominal segment with a pair of lateral processes. Length of anterior wing, ♂10 mm (0.39 in). ♀15 mm (0.59 in).

The hindwings of P. bistirpis are similar to P. hudsoni, but can be identified due to the enlarged setae and inconspicuous humeral vein.

== Distribution and habitat ==
Pseudoeconesus bistirpis is endemic to New Zealand, and is found across the North Island and the upper South Island. The species can be identified in traps year-round. It is found in seepages in New Zealand bush, and is believed to be reliant on forested ecosystems.

== Gallery ==
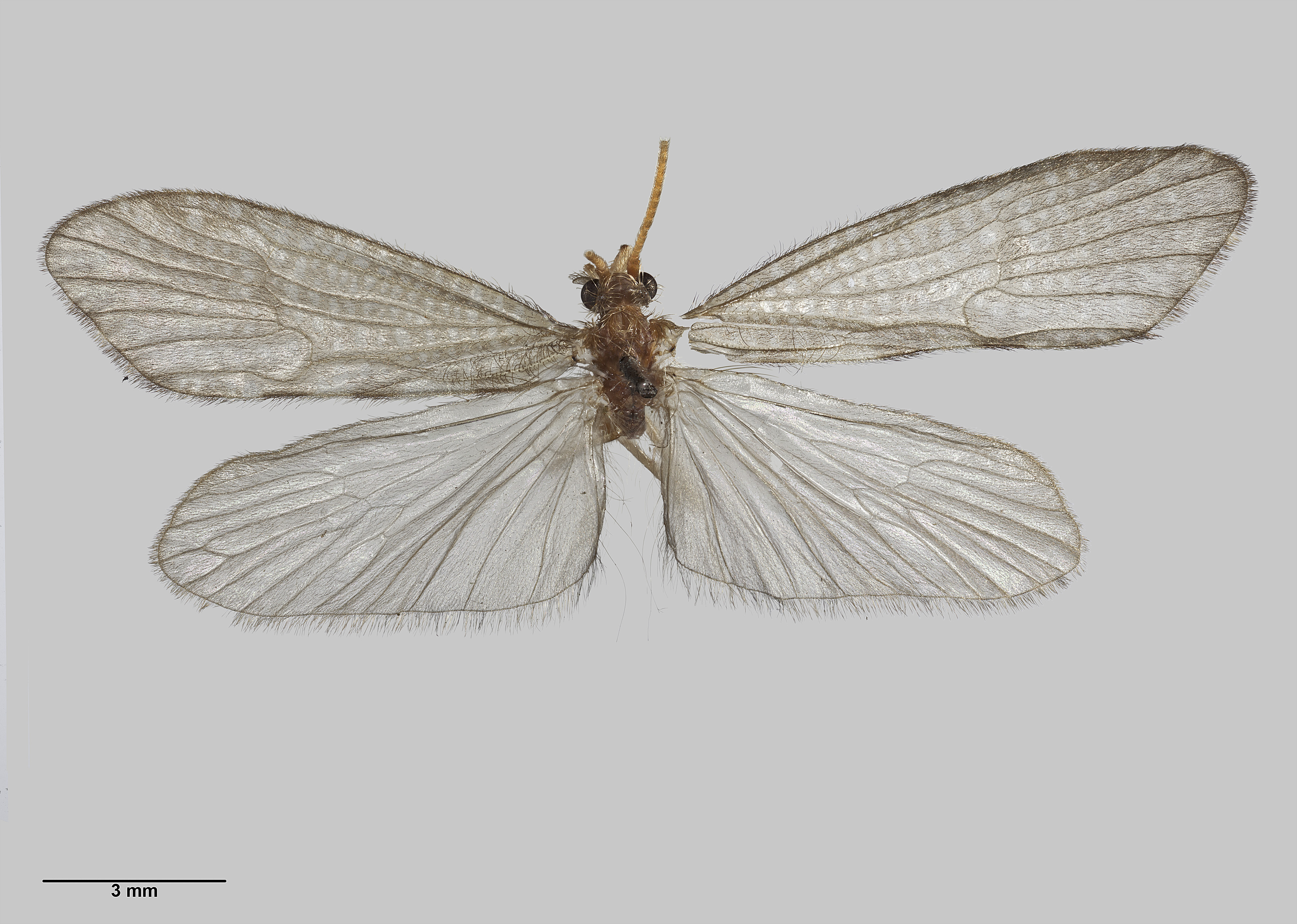
Male holotype specimen held at Auckland War Memorial Museum

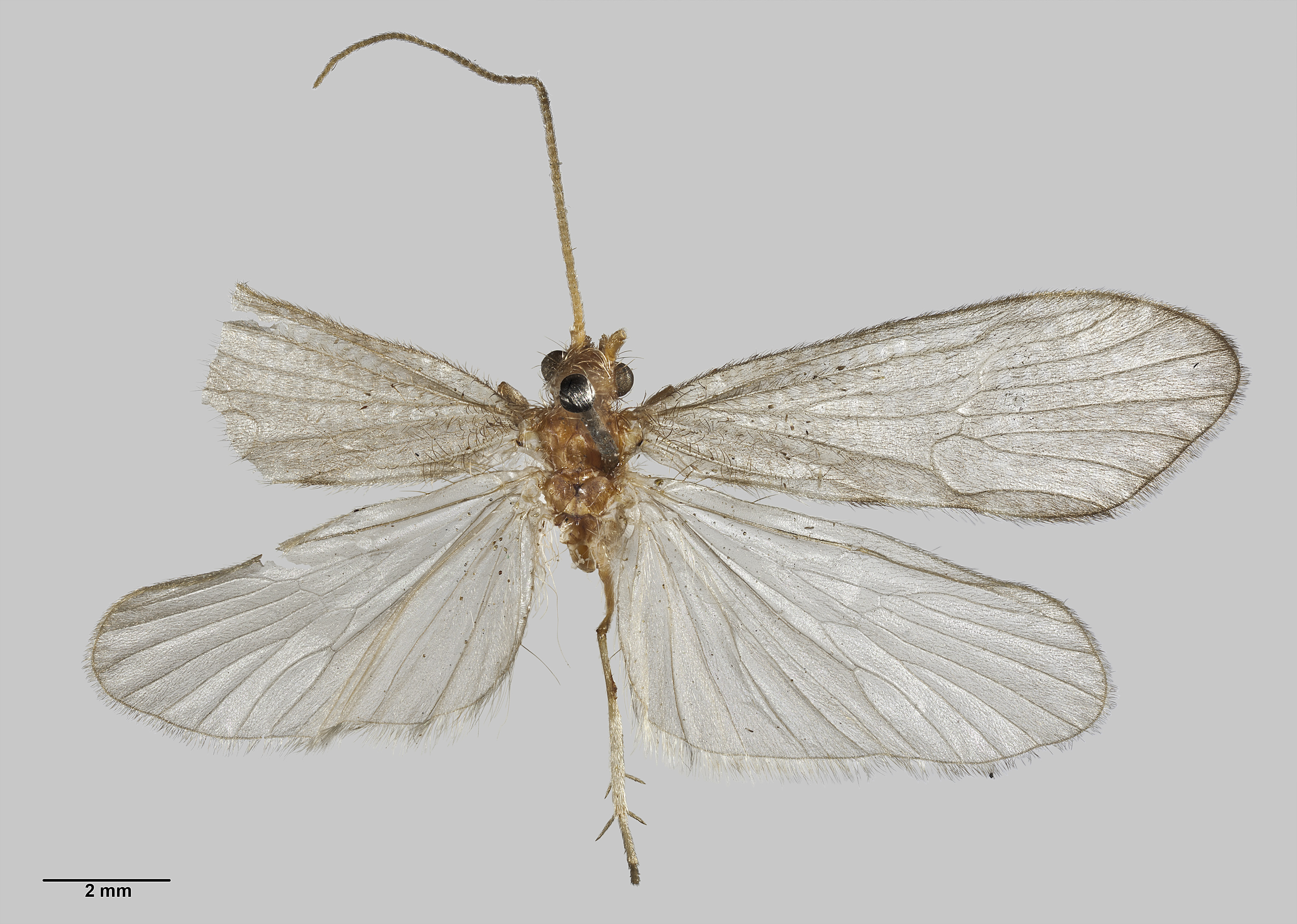
Male paratype specimen held at Auckland War Memorial Museum; the holotype of Pseudoeconesus tristirpis (synonymised in 1997)
