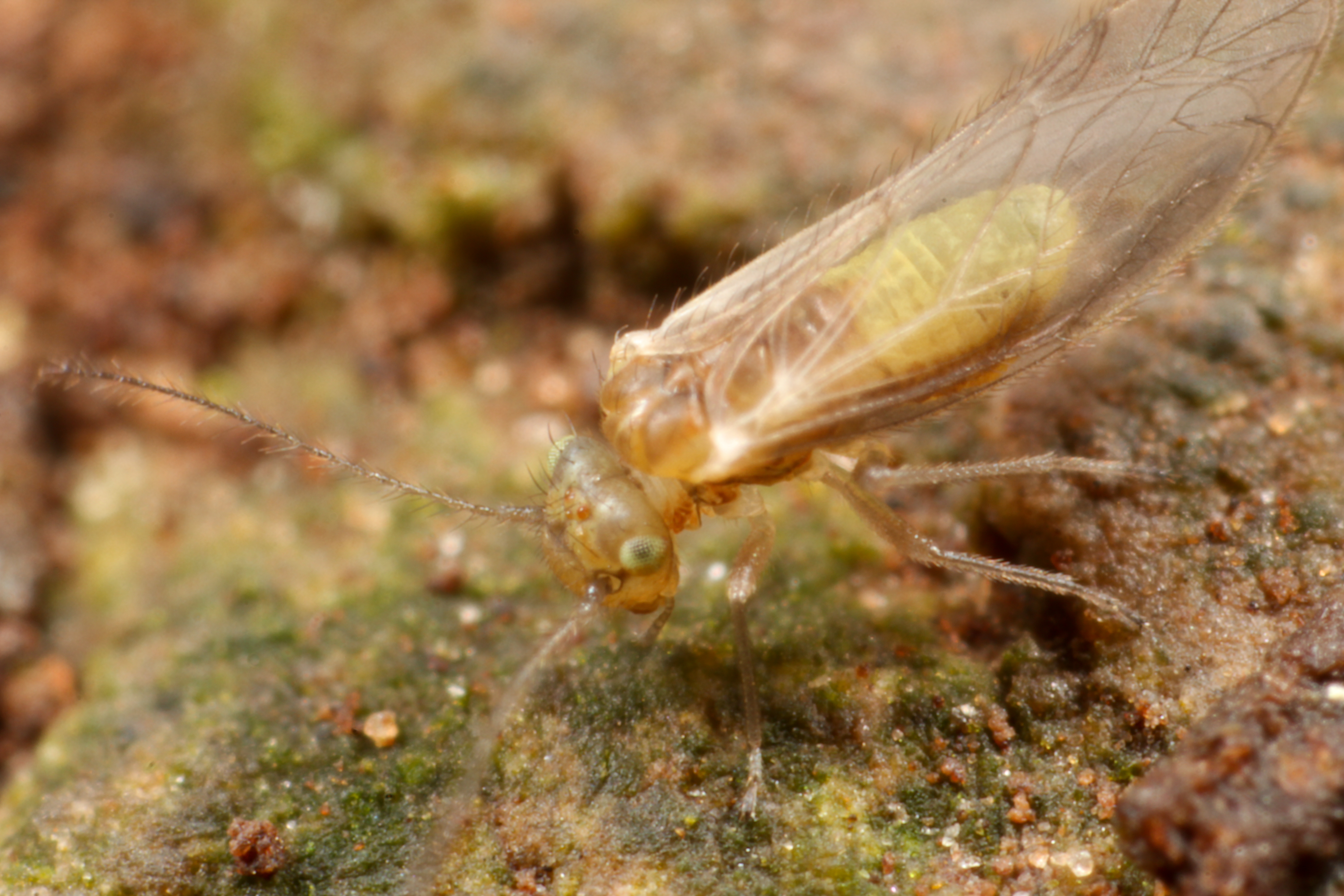

Scientific classification
- Domain: Eukaryota
- Kingdom: Animalia
- Phylum: Arthropoda
- Class: Insecta
- Order: Psocodea
- Family: Trichopsocidae
- Genus: Trichopsocus
- Species: T. brincki

Binomial name
- Trichopsocus brincki (Badonnel, 1963)

= Trichopsocus brincki =

Species of booklouse

Trichopsocus brincki is a species of Psocoptera from the Trichopsocidae family that can be found in England and Wales. The species are brown coloured.

== Habitat ==
The species feeds on blackthorn, elder, gorse, pine, and yew. The species also like to eat Douglas-fir and spruce cones.
