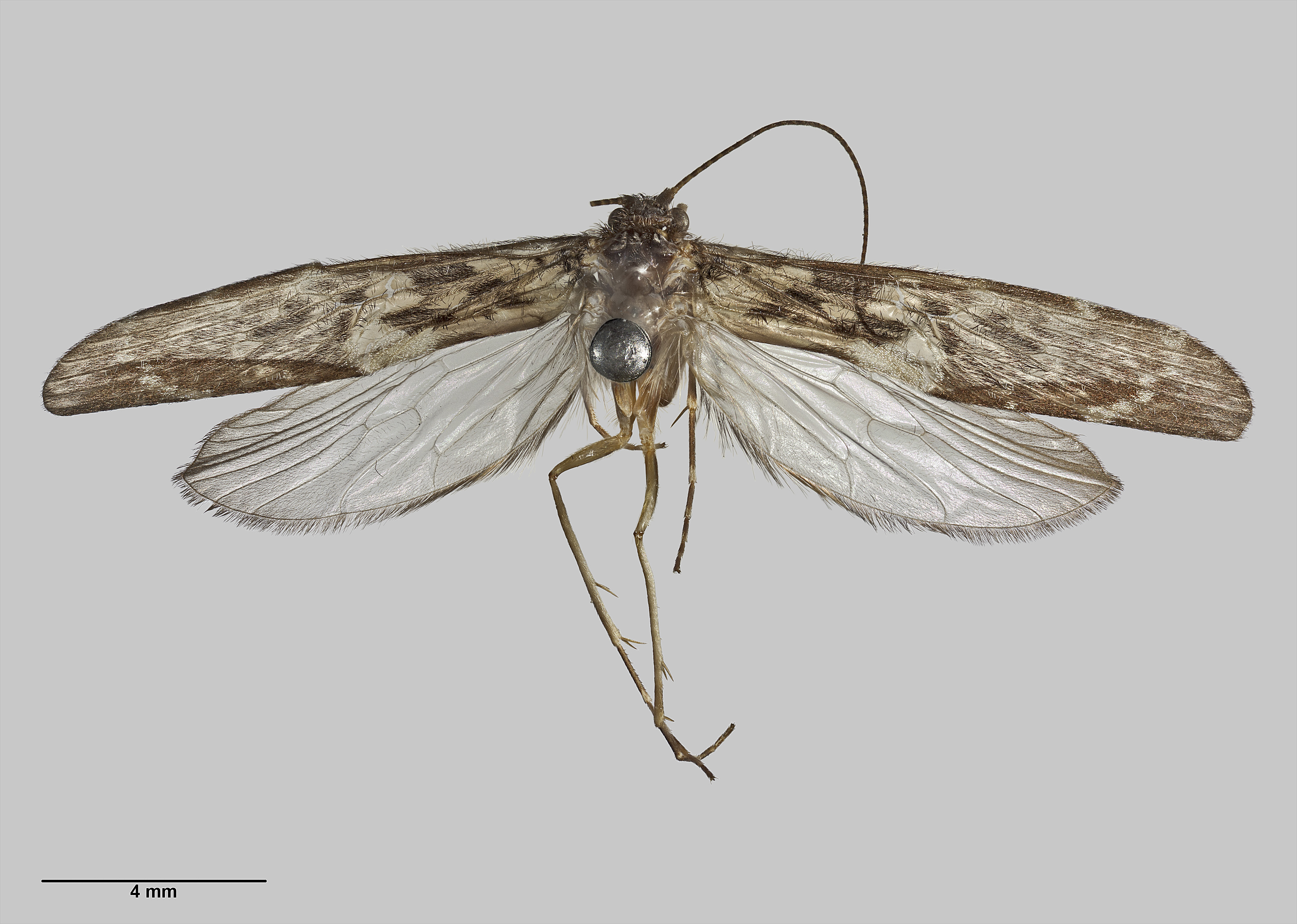
- Male holotype specimen from the collections of the Auckland War Memorial Museum

Conservation status
- Not Threatened (NZ TCS)

Scientific classification
- Kingdom: Animalia
- Phylum: Arthropoda
- Clade: Pancrustacea
- Class: Insecta
- Order: Trichoptera
- Family: Hydrobiosidae
- Genus: Psilochorema
- Species: P. embersoni

Binomial name
- Psilochorema embersoni Wise, 1982

= Psilochorema embersoni =

Species of caddisfly

Psilochorema embersoni is a species of caddisfly belonging to the family Hydrobiosidae. The species was first described by Keith Arthur John Wise in 1982, and is endemic to New Zealand.

== Taxonomy ==
The species was identified by Wise in 1982, based on a specimen collected by Rowan Mark Emberson and C. A. Muir from the Murchison Mountains in Fiordland National Park, New Zealand. Wise named the species after Emberson.

== Description ==
Wise's original text (the type description) reads as follows:

Genitalia, ♂ (Figs. 1-3). Dorsal process (Segment X) membranous, elongate. Above superior appendages an internal curved spine together with an external rounded process on each side; superior appendages long, bent near middle. Inferior appendages short, stout, tapering to apex ventrally in lateral view, with apical inner teeth; dorsal arm wide, expanded apically; apical expansion bent inward with outer angle bearing a central tubercle; points of expansion sub-equal in length, bearing internal teeth. Aedeagus with mid-length lateral expansions and a dark apical dorsal flap.

Wise measured the length of the forewings as 11.5 mm (0.45 in).

== Distribution and habitat ==
The species is endemic to New Zealand.
