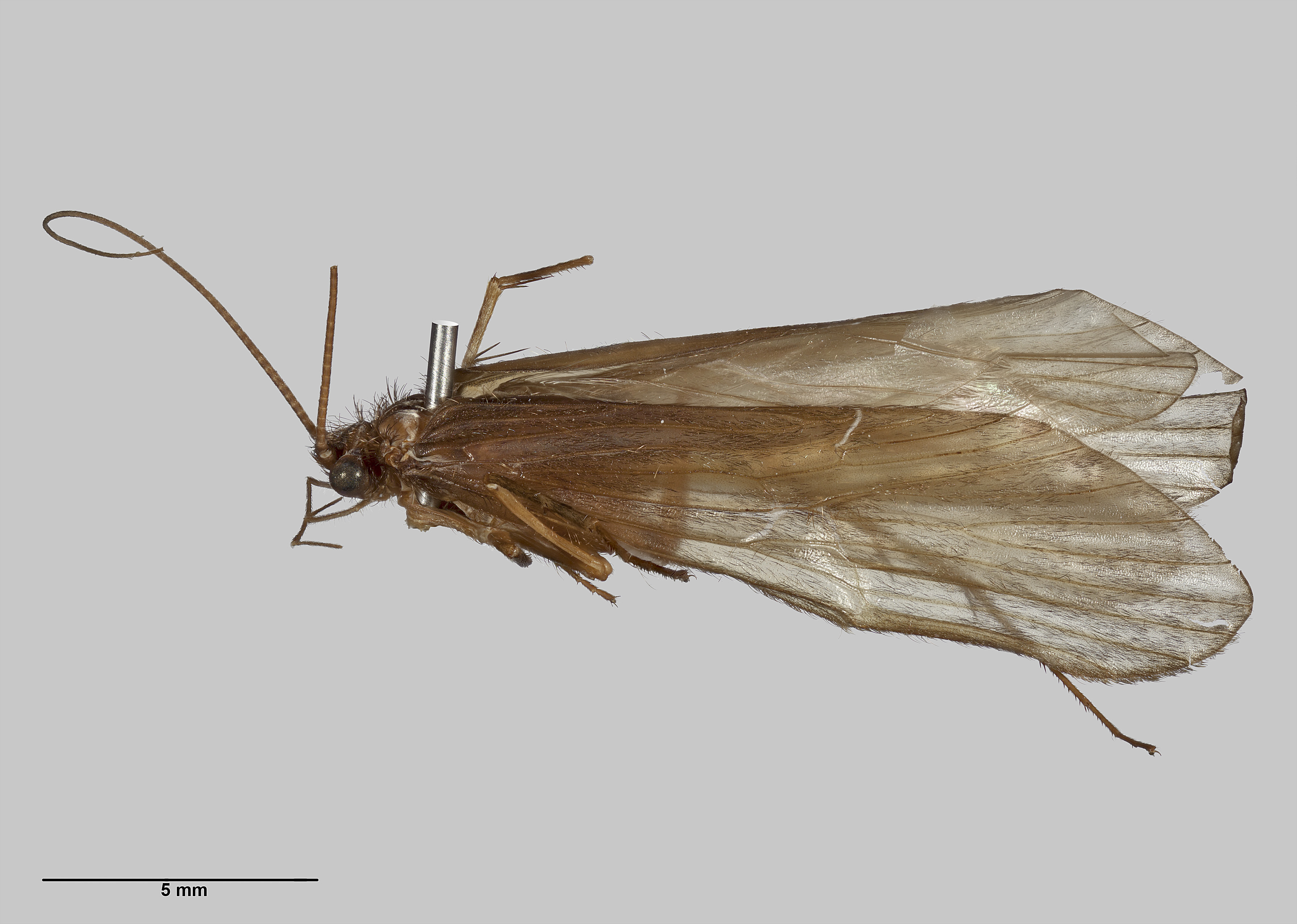
- Male holotype specimen from the collections of the Auckland War Memorial Museum

Conservation status
- Naturally Uncommon (NZ TCS)

Scientific classification
- Kingdom: Animalia
- Phylum: Arthropoda
- Clade: Pancrustacea
- Class: Insecta
- Order: Trichoptera
- Family: Hydrobiosidae
- Genus: Edpercivalia
- Species: E. harrisoni

Binomial name
- Edpercivalia harrisoni Wise, 1982

= Edpercivalia harrisoni =

Species of caddisfly

Edpercivalia harrisoni is a species of caddisfly belonging to the family Hydrobiosidae. The species was first described by Keith Arthur John Wise in 1982, and is endemic to New Zealand.

== Taxonomy ==
The species was first described by Wise in 1982, based on a specimen collected by Rowan Mark Emberson and C. A. Muir from the Murchison Mountains in Fiordland National Park, New Zealand. Wise named the species after entomologist R. A. Harrison.

== Description ==
Wise's original text (the type description) reads as follows:

Species typical of genus in wing pattern, wing venation and posterior spine on Abdomen VII and ventral extensions of posterior margin on Abdomen VIII, IX. Genitalia, ♂ (Figs. 4-7). Dorsal process (Segment X) membranous. Segment IX reduced to a thin band dorsally; paraproctal processes large, conspicuous, with short setae dorsally, crossed-over in present specimen; below each process a lateral setose protuberance. Superior appendages elongate. Inferior appendages short, elongate in lateral view with apex rounded dorsally and concave below. Aedeagus (Fig. 5) curved dorsally with paired appendages, the dorsal pair strongly down-curved before apices, the ventral pair slightly up-curved at tip, all dark-brown.

Wise measured the length of the forewings as 16 mm (0.63 in).

== Distribution and habitat ==
The species is endemic to New Zealand.
