= Tiphobiosis kuscheli =

Conservation status
- Data Deficit (NZ TCS)

Scientific classification
- Kingdom: Animalia
- Phylum: Arthropoda
- Clade: Pancrustacea
- Class: Insecta
- Order: Trichoptera
- Family: Hydrobiosidae
- Genus: Tiphobiosis
- Species: T. kuscheli

Binomial name
- Tiphobiosis kuscheli Wise, 1972

Species of caddisfly

Tiphobiosis kuscheli is a species of caddisfly belonging to the family Hydrobiosidae. The species was first described by Keith Arthur John Wise in 1972, and is endemic to the Auckland Islands of New Zealand.

== Taxonomy ==
The species was identified by Wise in 1972, based on a single specimen collected in 1966 from leaf litter on Adams Island off the coast of Auckland Island by Guillermo Kuschel, after whom the species was named. The larvae of the species was first described in 1978.

== Description ==
Wise's original text (the type description) reads as follows:

A small pale species with dark dorsal surface of abdomen, known only from the unique ♂ holotype.

Wings, ♂ (Figs. 17, 18). Reduced, not reaching beyond end of abdomen. Costa of anterior wing with fold. Venation reduced, particularly in posterior wings and in right anterior wing of holotype. Discoidal cell of anterior wing open, Apical fork 1 absent from all wings; apical forks 2, 3, 4, 5 present in left anterior wing of holotype. Posterior wings narrow, elongate, without apical forks. Abdomen, ♂ (Figs. 19, 20). Segment II with a pair of sensory organs, VII with a long ventral process, VIII slightly produced mid-ventrally. Segments I-VIII dark above, with fine transverse and longitudinal striae dorso-laterally.

Genitalia, ♂ (Figs. 21-23), Segment IX membranous dorsally. Segment X continuous dorsally with IX in a long narrow process (dorsal plate). Superior appendages large, almost as long as dorsal plate, each with basal inwardly curved process. Inferior appendages as long as superior appendages, each consisting of basal portion from which arise a narrow elongate distal process and short internal basal process, both processes curved inwards, internal basal process with ventrally-turned setose apex. Aedeagus with blunt upturned point..

Wise measured the holotype as having an anterior wing length of 3.5 mm (0.14 in), with the head and body measuring a combined 4 mm (0.16 in).

== Distribution and habitat ==
The species is endemic to the Auckland Islands of New Zealand.
