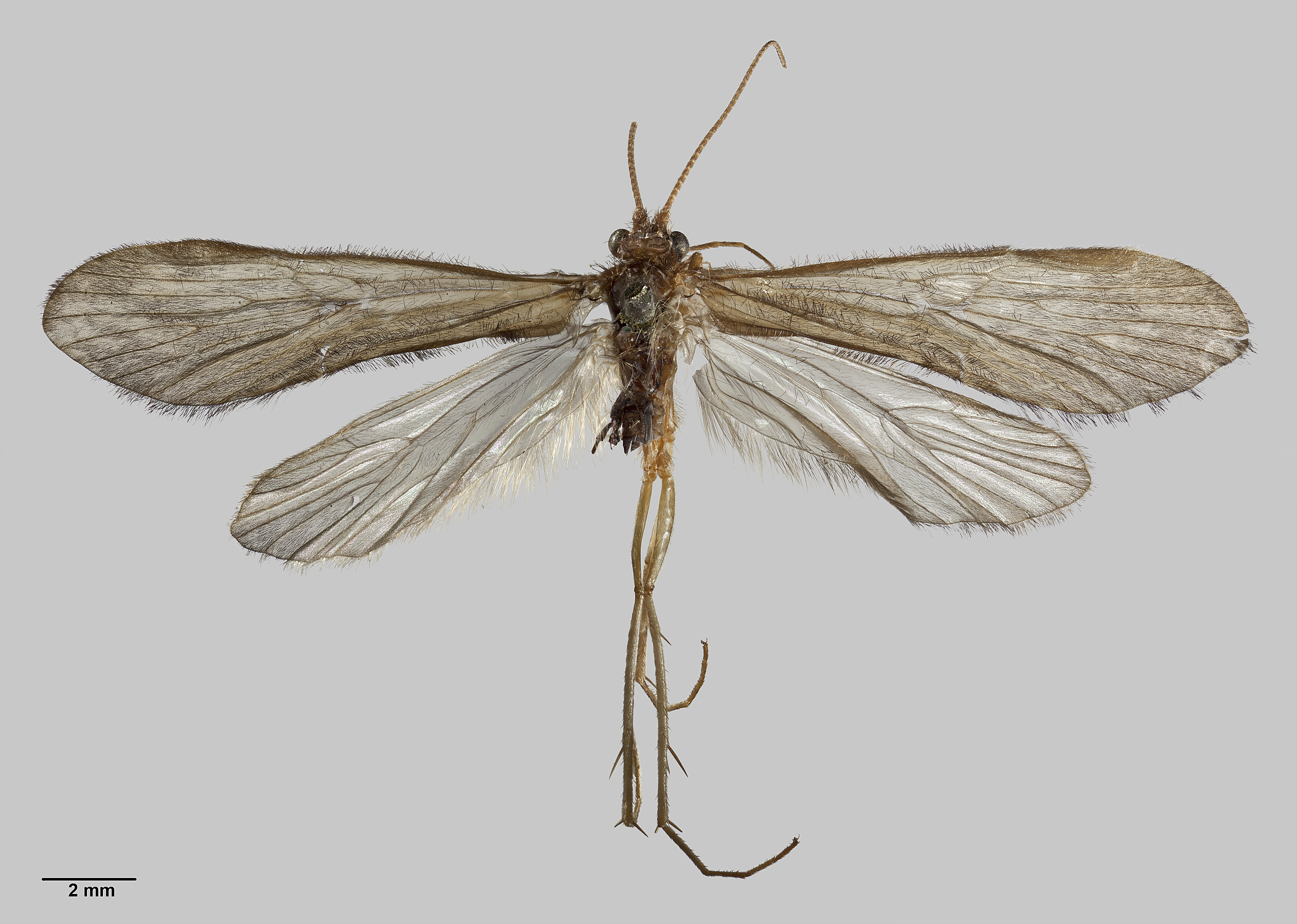
- Male holotype specimen held at Auckland War Memorial Museum

Conservation status
- Naturally Uncommon (NZ TCS)

Scientific classification
- Kingdom: Animalia
- Phylum: Arthropoda
- Clade: Pancrustacea
- Class: Insecta
- Order: Trichoptera
- Family: Hydrobiosidae
- Genus: Hydrobiosis
- Species: H. falcis

Binomial name
- Hydrobiosis falcis Wise, 1958

= Hydrobiosis falcis =

Species of caddisfly

Hydrobiosis falcis is a species of caddisfly belonging to the family Hydrobiosidae. The species was first described by Keith Arthur John Wise in 1958, and is endemic to New Zealand.

== Taxonomy ==
The species was identified by Wise in 1958. The species is genetically most closely related to H. styracine, and more distantly related to H. budgei, H. copis, H. johnsi, H. parumbripennis and H. umbripennis.

== Description ==
Wise's original text (the type description) reads as follows:

HEAD fuscous; ANTENNAE fuscous. THORAX fuscous; LEGS dark ochreous. ANTERIOR WINGS dark testaceous. Length of anterior wing, 12 mm (0.47 in).

Wise noted that the species could be distinguished from other Hydrobiosis species by the inner arm of each inferior appendage being much shorter than the outer arm, something not seen in H. umbripennis or H. parumbripennis.

== Distribution and habitat ==
The species is endemic to New Zealand. Specimens have been collected from Mount Taranaki, Mount Ruapehu, and near Lake Waikaremoana.
