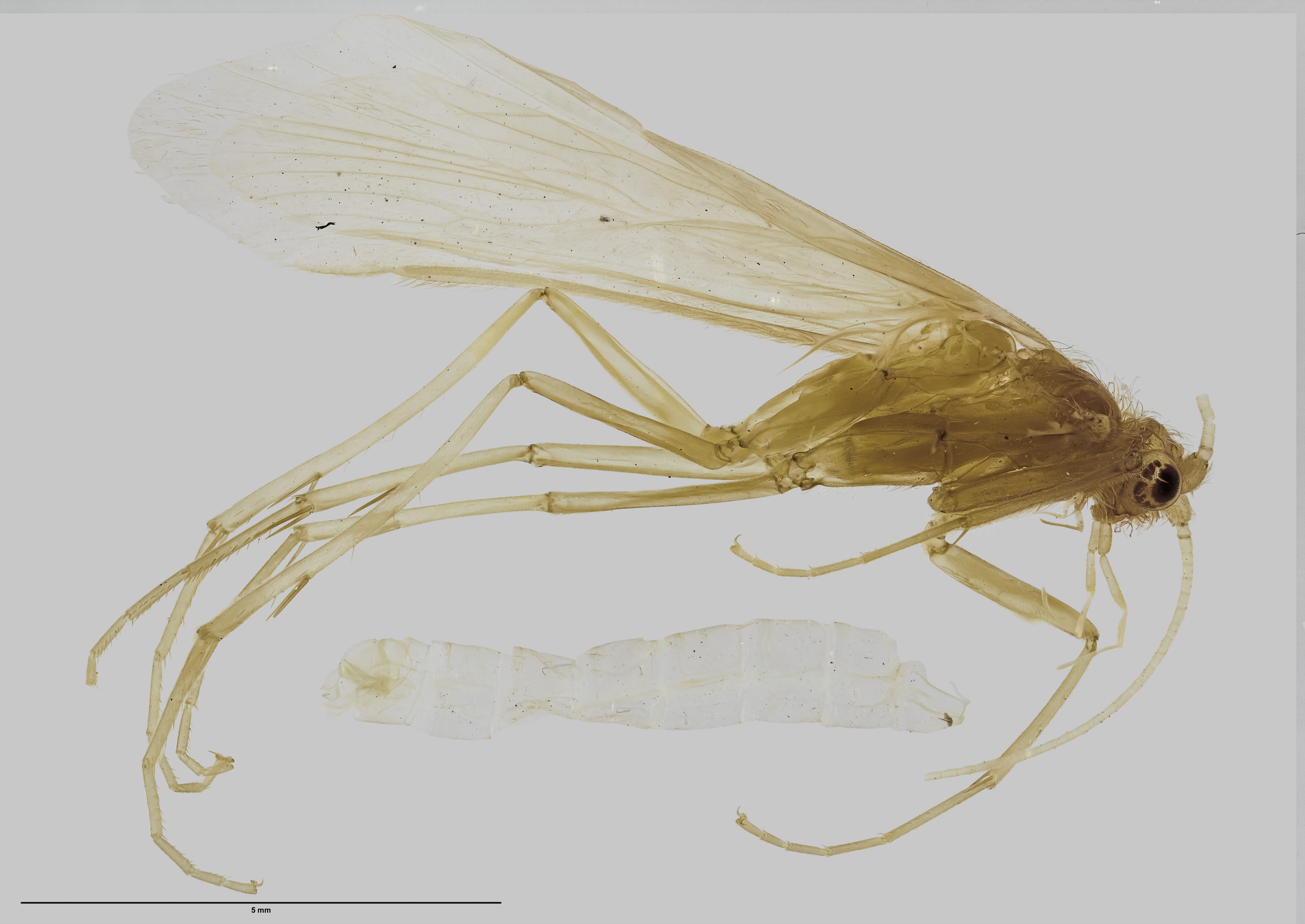
- Holotype specimen held at Auckland War Memorial Museum

Conservation status
- Naturally Uncommon (NZ TCS)

Scientific classification
- Kingdom: Animalia
- Phylum: Arthropoda
- Clade: Pancrustacea
- Class: Insecta
- Order: Trichoptera
- Family: Hydrobiosidae
- Genus: Costachorema
- Species: C. notopterum

Binomial name
- Costachorema notopterum Wise, 1972

Synonyms
- Costachorema notoptera Wise, 1972

= Costachorema notopterum =

Species of caddisfly

Costachorema notopterum is a species of caddisfly belonging to the family Hydrobiosidae. The species was first described by Keith Arthur John Wise in 1972, and is endemic to the Auckland Islands of New Zealand.

== Taxonomy ==
The species was identified by Wise in 1972 using the spelling Costachorema notoptera, based on a specimen collected by Wise from Enderby Island off the coast of Auckland Island in 1963.

== Description ==
Wise's original text (the type description) reads as follows:

A medium-sized species with pale brown wings longer than body, hairs of head all dark brown.

Wings, ♂♀ (Figs. 1-2). Venation normal for genus. Abdomen and genitalia, ♂ (Figs. 3-7). Segment VII with ventral process; dorsal posterior margin of VIII straight, membranous or lightly sclerotised mid-dorsally. Segment IX membranous dorsally. Segment X (dorsal plate) membranous with two apical concavities distally. Superior appendages rounded apically, a pair of long elongate processes beneath them, each process expanded apically with a basal dorsal stout process, an adjacent short narrow process internally. Inferior appendages stout, two-jointed, basal joint somewhat rounded apically, distal joint leaf-like, approximately halt length of basal. Aedeagus as figured (Figs. 6-7).

Abdomen and genitalia, ♀ (Figs. 8-11). Abdomen V with minute ventral tooth in lateral view: tooth broad, rounded in ventral view; line of tooth extending as oval line on sternite. Abd. VI with short ventral tooth; VII without tooth. Abd. VIII strongly chitinised, annular about abdomen; sternite extending posteriorly to upturned distal point, the posterior extension supporting a fleshy lobe. Beyond Abd. VIII, a large dorsal chitinised shield (Abd. IX?), with a fleshy apical lobe (Abd. X?) bearing a dorso-lateral pair of tubercles and a pair of minute distal tubercles.

Wise measured the anterior wings of male specimens as ranging between 10.5–11.25 mm (0.413–0.443 in), with female species slightly larger at 12.5–13 mm (0.49–0.51 in). The head and body of male specimens measures between 8.25–8.5 mm (0.325–0.335 in), with female ranging between 9.5–10 mm (0.37–0.39 in). C. notopterum larvae are pale purple in colour, with darker bands and pale spots.

The species is morphologically similar to Costachorema psaroptera. The two species can be differentiated by the presence of white hairs on the head of C. psaroptera.

== Distribution and habitat ==
The species is endemic to the Auckland Islands of New Zealand.
