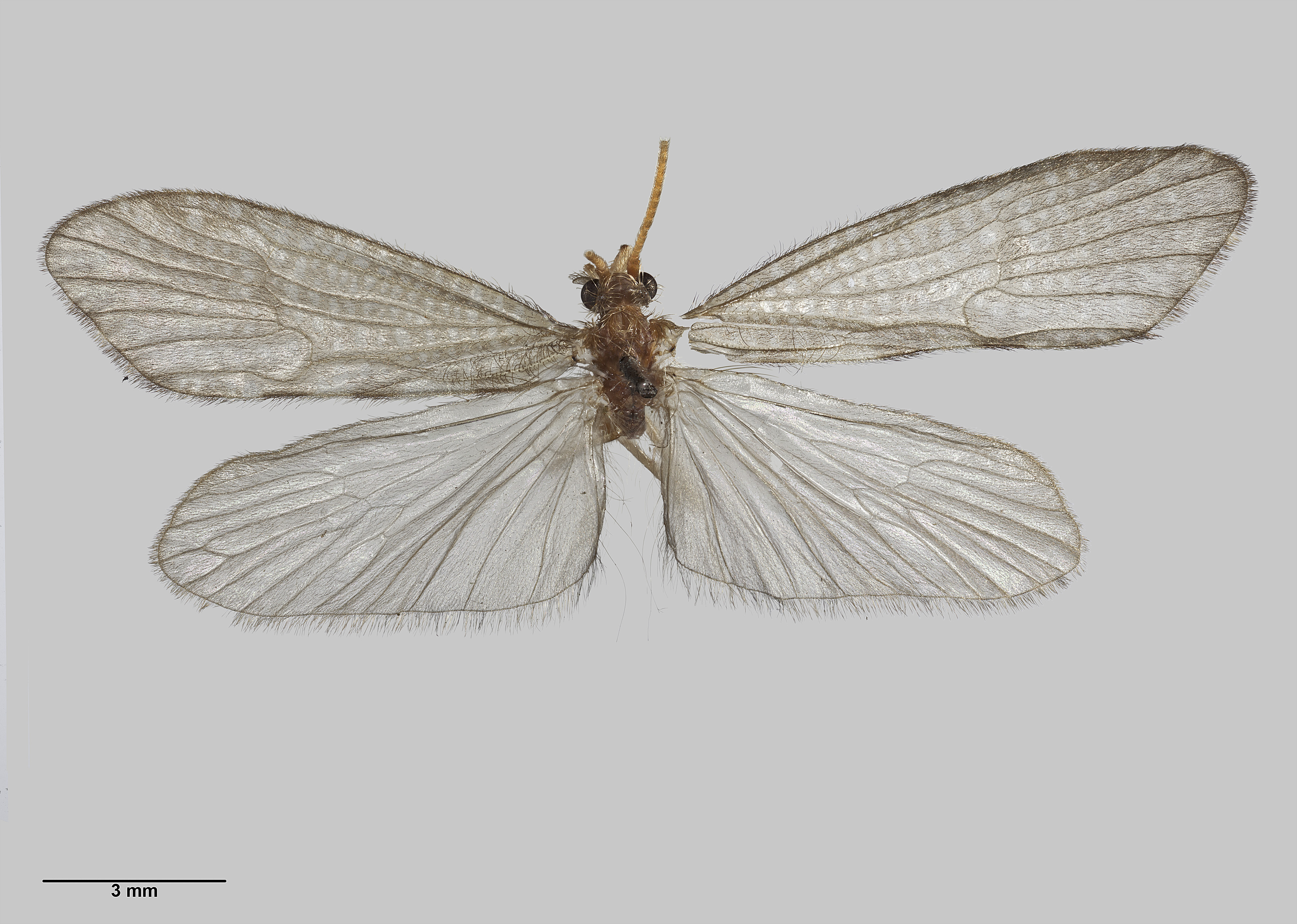
- Pseudoeconesus bistirpis

Scientific classification
- Kingdom: Animalia
- Phylum: Arthropoda
- Clade: Pancrustacea
- Class: Insecta
- Order: Trichoptera
- Family: Oeconesidae
- Genus: Pseudoeconesus; McLachlan, 1894

Species
- See text

= Pseudoeconesus =

Genus of insects

Pseudoeconesus is a genus of caddisflies belonging to the family Oeconesidae. The genus was first recognised by Robert McLachlan in 1894. All known species of Pseudoeconesus are endemic to New Zealand.

== Taxonomy ==
The genus was first identified by Robert McLachlan in 1894, who used the spelling Pseudœconesus, and named Pseudoeconesus mimus as the type species. Genetically, Pseudoeconesus forms a clade with three other Oeconesidae genera: Tarapsyche, Oeconesus and Zelandopsyche.

== Description ==
McLachlan's original text (the type description) reads as follows:

The species of this genus resemble Œconesus in a very remarkable manner, but the neuration of the ♂ is quite different. The characters here given are mainly comparative.

♂. Characters of antenne, palpi, legs, &c., practically the same. In the anterior wings there is no costal fold and no defined groove (present in Œconesus); the radius is confluent with the first apical sector (in both sexes and in both pairs, as in Œconesus); upper edge of discoidal cell excised (straight in Œconesus); apical forks Nos. 1, 2 and 3 present (irregular afterwards), the 6th apical cellule very much dilated at its base in a nearly circular manner. In the posterior wings apical forks Nos. 1, 2, 3 and 5 are present, and the neuration is apparently regular (but abnormally irregular on one side in the only male before me). ♀. The joints of the labial palpi shorter and broader, the terminal joint almost spoon-shaped. In the anterior and posterior wings apical forks Nos. 1, 2,3 and 5 are present, and the neuration appears to be normal and regular.

It appears to me probable that Œconesus and Pseudœconesus may have affinity with the group of genera represented by Goëra, Silo, &c.

== Distribution ==
The genus is found in New Zealand.

== Species ==
- Pseudoeconesus bistirpis Wise, 1958
- Pseudoeconesus geraldinae Ward, 1997
- Pseudoeconesus haasti Ward, 1997
- Pseudoeconesus hendersoni Ward, 1997
- Pseudoeconesus hudsoni Mosely, 1953
- Pseudoeconesus mimus McLachlan, 1894
- Pseudoeconesus paludis Ward, 1997
- Pseudoeconesus squamosus Mosely, 1953
- Pseudoeconesus stramineus McLachlan, 1894
