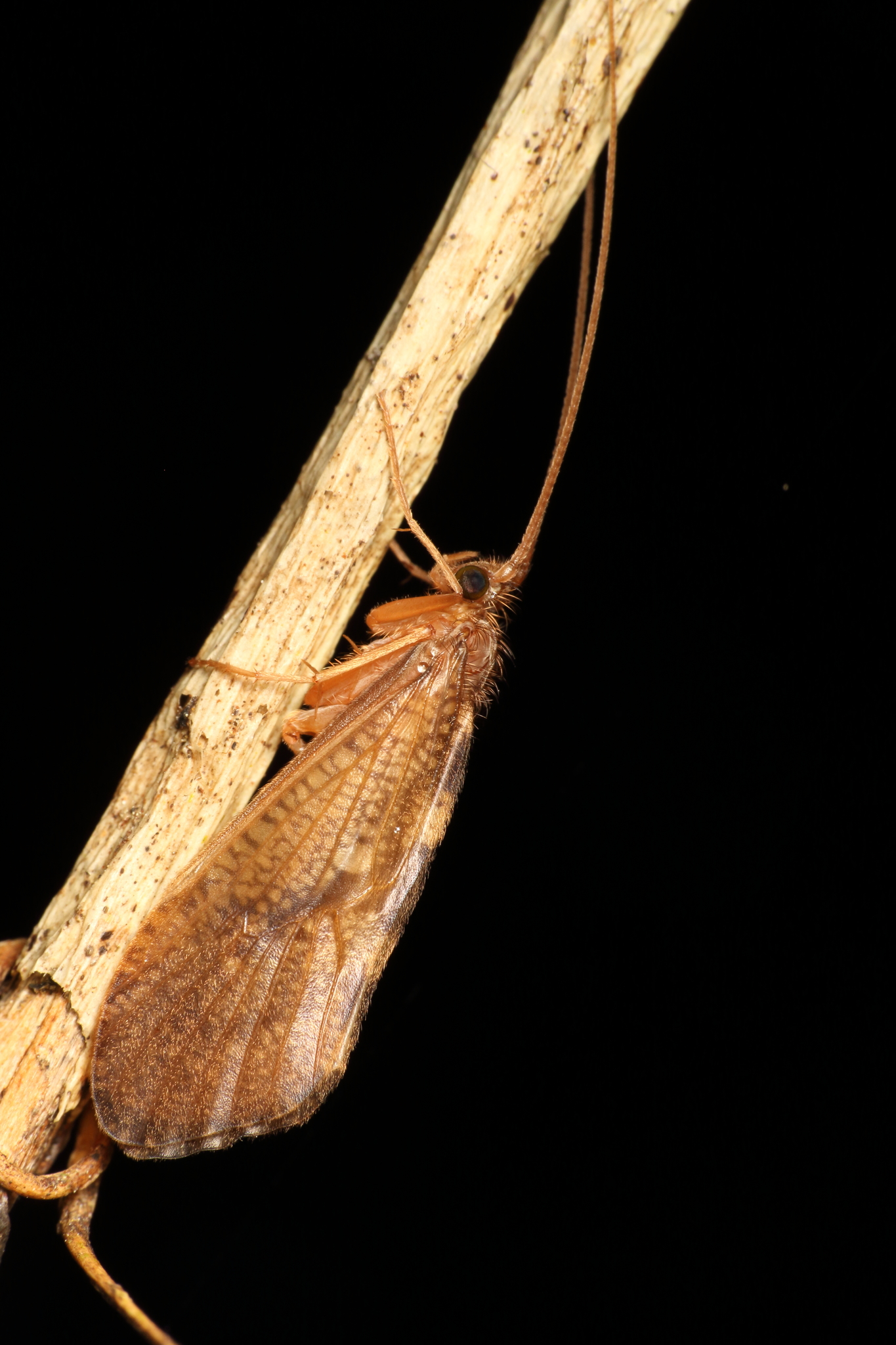
- The type species Oeconesus maori seen in situ in the Hutt Valley, New Zealand

Scientific classification
- Kingdom: Animalia
- Phylum: Arthropoda
- Clade: Pancrustacea
- Class: Insecta
- Order: Trichoptera
- Family: Oeconesidae
- Genus: Oeconesus; McLachlan, 1862

Species
- See text

= Oeconesus =

Genus of insects

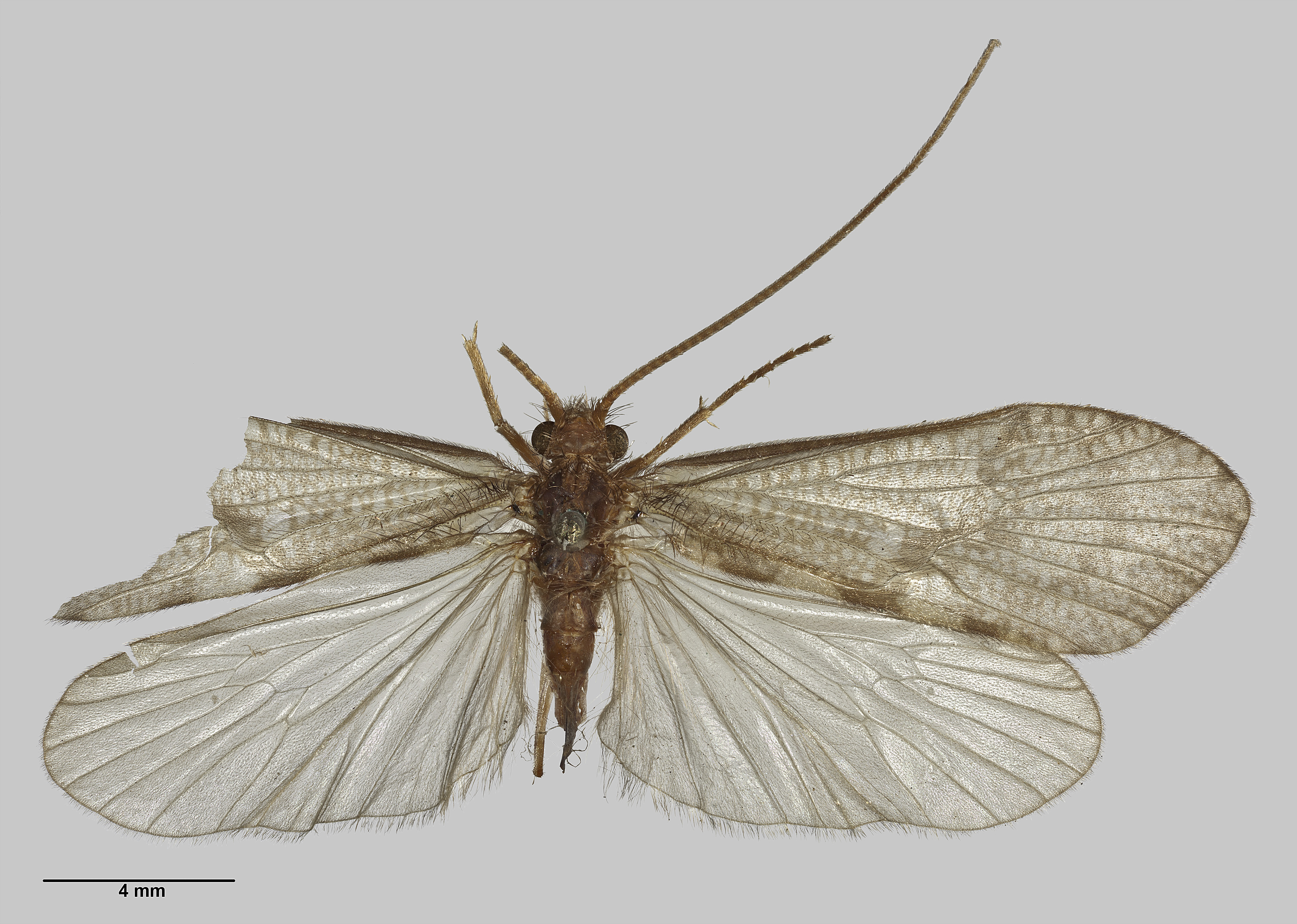
Type specimen of Oeconesus lobatus from the collections of Auckland War Memorial Museum

Oeconesus is a genus of caddisflies belonging to the family Oeconesidae. The genus was first recognised by Robert McLachlan in 1862. All known species of Oeconesus are endemic to New Zealand.

== Taxonomy ==
Robert McLachlan in 1862 originally placed the genus within the family Sericostomatidae. This was revised in 1921 when Robert John Tillyard placed Oeconesus within the family Oeconesidae. Tillyard designated Oeconesus as the type genus of the family. McLachlan designated Oeconesus maori as the type species of the genus. Genetically, Oeconesus forms a clade with three other Oeconesidae genera: Tarapsyche, Pseudoeconesus and Zelandopsyche.

== Description ==
McLachlan's original text (the type description) reads as follows:

Male. — Antennae about the length of the wings, basal joint short, and rather thick, not so long as the head; head quadrate; maxillary palpi oval-elongate, much swollen, curved up in front of the head, their apices, viewed from above, appearing as two rounded tubercles between the antennae, moderately hairy; labial palpi with the basal joint short, second and third of equal length, long; anterior tibiae with two short spurs, intermediate and posterior, each with four long unequal spurs.

Anterior wings rather short and broad, very slightly hairy, the costa much arched, apical margin almost straight; the costa from the base to the pterostigma is narrowly folded inwards; discoidal cell long and narrow, the ramus thyrifer does not fork before the anastomosis, and from this cause there are only eight apical cells; the anastomosis is complete and very oblique from the third apical cell, the lower part is not connected with the inner margin by a transverse vein, and the last apical cell is continued from the apex to near the base of the wing, the apical portion being very broad; near the base of the third apical cell in all four wings is a small round hyaline spot; posterior wings broad, folded; discoidal cell short and triangular.

This genus, although very characteristic of the family, differs in a marked degree from all others. The anomalous arrangement of the venation is somewhat extraordinary, even in this family, where singularity of structure appears to be the rule.

== Distribution ==
The genus is found in New Zealand.

== Species ==
- Oeconesus angustus Ward, 1997
- Oeconesus incisus Mosely, 1953
- Oeconesus lobatus Wise, 1958
- Oeconesus maori McLachlan, 1862
- Oeconesus similis Mosely, 1953
