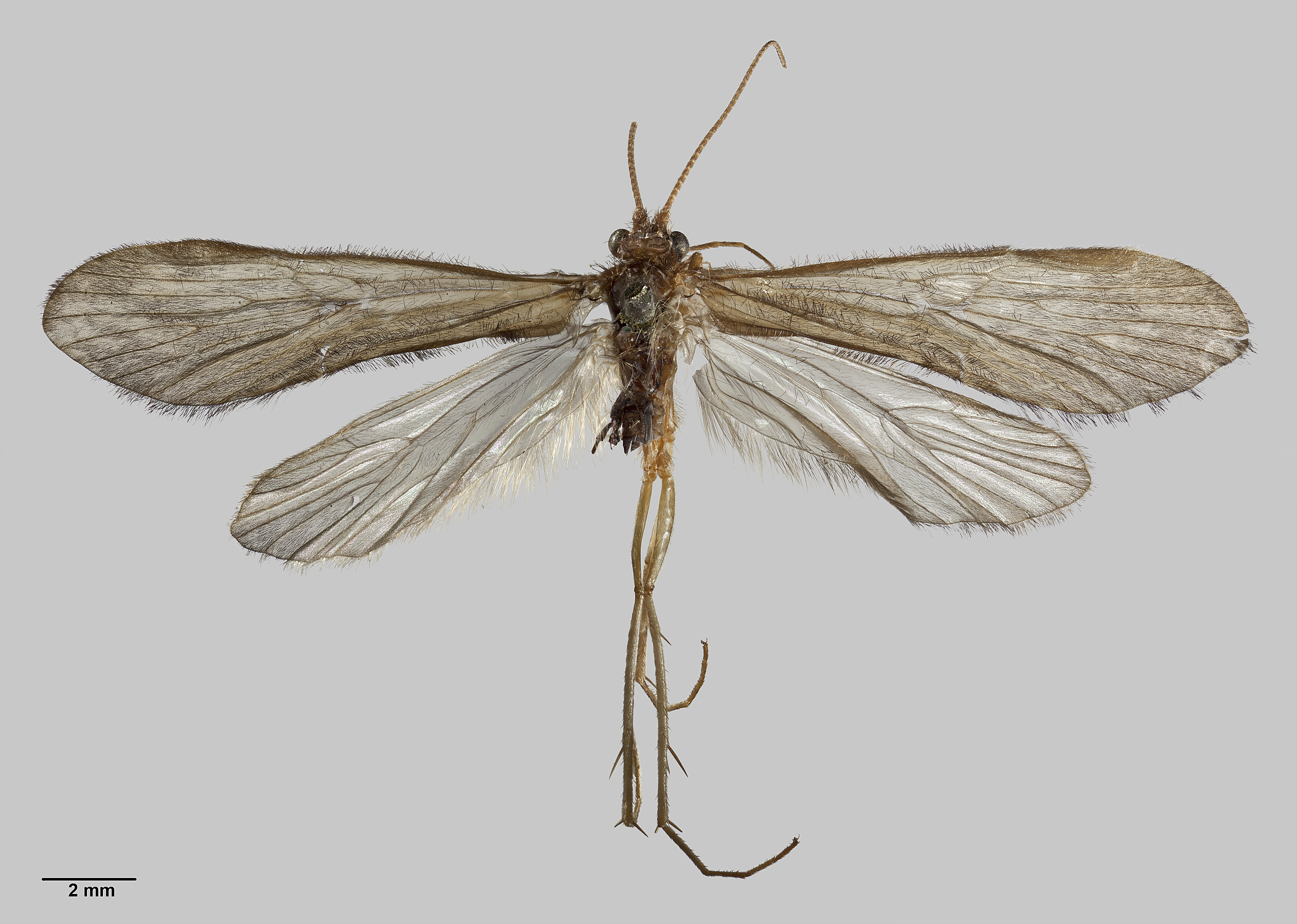
- Hydrobiosis falcis

Scientific classification
- Kingdom: Animalia
- Phylum: Arthropoda
- Clade: Pancrustacea
- Class: Insecta
- Order: Trichoptera
- Family: Hydrobiosidae
- Genus: Hydrobiosis; McLachlan, 1868

= Hydrobiosis =

Genus of insects

Hydrobiosis is a genus of caddisflies belonging to the family Hydrobiosidae. The genus was erected by Robert McLachlan in 1868.

== Distribution ==
The genus is found in New Zealand, the Chatham Islands, Australia (Tasmania, South Australia), and Fiji.

== Species ==
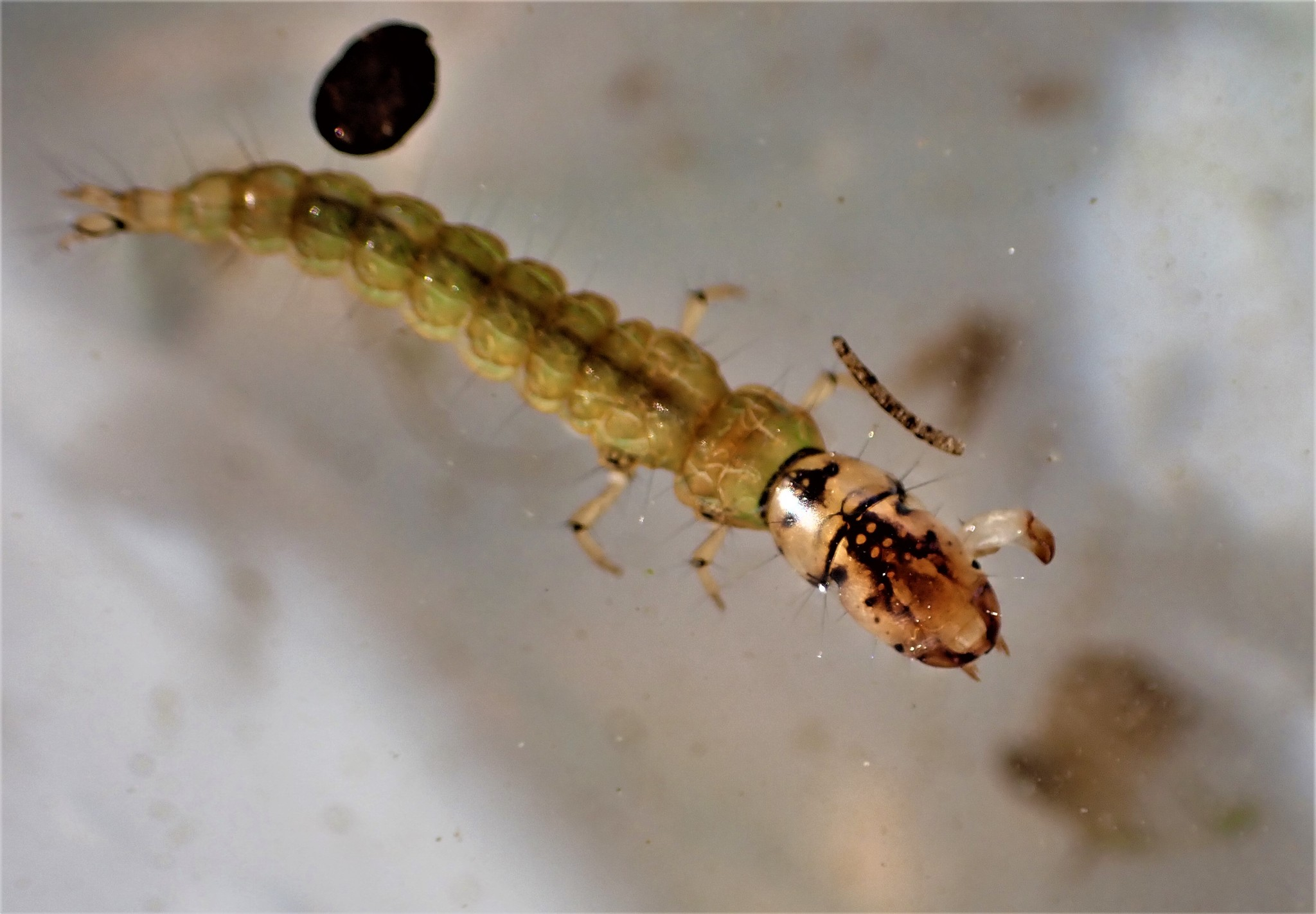
Larvae of Hydrobiosis parumbripennis

- Hydrobiosis budgei McFarlane, 1960
- Hydrobiosis centralis Ward, 1997
- Hydrobiosis chalcodes McFarlane, 1981
- Hydrobiosis charadraea McFarlane, 1951
- Hydrobiosis clavigera McFarlane, 1951
- Hydrobiosis copis McFarlane, 1960
- Hydrobiosis falcis Wise, 1958
- Hydrobiosis frater McLachlan, 1868
- Hydrobiosis gollanis Mosely, 1953
- Hydrobiosis harpidiosa McFarlane, 1951
- Hydrobiosis johnsi McFarlane, 1981
- Hydrobiosis kiddi McFarlane, 1951
- Hydrobiosis lindsayi Tillyard, 1925
- Hydrobiosis neadelphus Ward, 1997
- Hydrobiosis parumbripennis McFarlane, 1951
- Hydrobiosis sherleyi Ward, 1998
- Hydrobiosis silvicola McFarlane, 1951
- Hydrobiosis soror Mosely, 1953
- Hydrobiosis spatulata McFarlane, 1951
- Hydrobiosis styracine McFarlane, 1960
- Hydrobiosis styx McFarlane, 1951
- Hydrobiosis taumata Ward, 1997
- Hydrobiosis torrentis Ward, 1995
- Hydrobiosis umbripennis McLachlan, 1868

== Feeding ==
Hydrobiosis are carnivorous, with older instars consuming exclusively other invertebrates like simuliid and chironomid larvae. Early instars are detritivores that feed on fine organic matter such as dead leaves and wood, and algae fragments.
