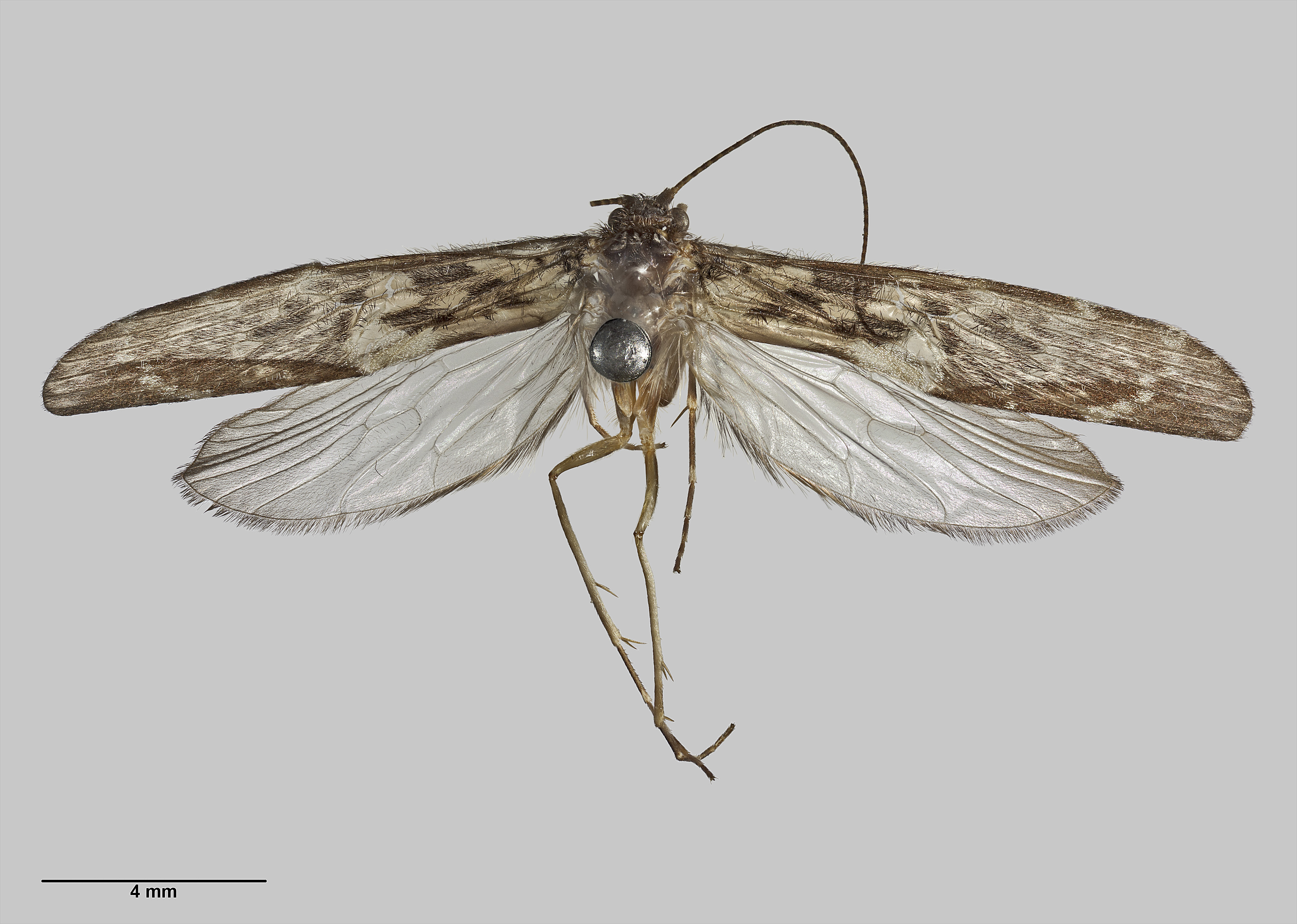
- Psilochorema embersoni

Scientific classification
- Kingdom: Animalia
- Phylum: Arthropoda
- Clade: Pancrustacea
- Class: Insecta
- Order: Trichoptera
- Family: Hydrobiosidae
- Genus: Psilochorema; McLachlan, 1866

Species
- See text

= Psilochorema =

Genus of insects

Psilochorema is a genus of caddisflies belonging to the family Hydrobiosidae. The genus was first recognised by Robert McLachlan in 1866.

== Distribution ==
The genus is endemic to New Zealand.

== Species ==
- Psilochorema acheir McFarlane, 1981
- Psilochorema bidens McFarlane, 1951
- Psilochorema cheirodes McFarlane, 1981
- Psilochorema donaldsoni McFarlane, 1960
- Psilochorema embersoni Wise, 1982
- Psilochorema folioharpax McFarlane, 1956
- Psilochorema leptoharpax McFarlane, 1951
- Psilochorema macroharpax McFarlane, 1951
- Psilochorema mataura McFarlane, 1956
- Psilochorema mimicum McLachlan, 1866
- Psilochorema nemorale McFarlane, 1951
- Psilochorema spiniharpax Ward, 1995
- Psilochorema tautoru McFarlane, 1964
- Psilochorema vomerharpax McFarlane, 1964
