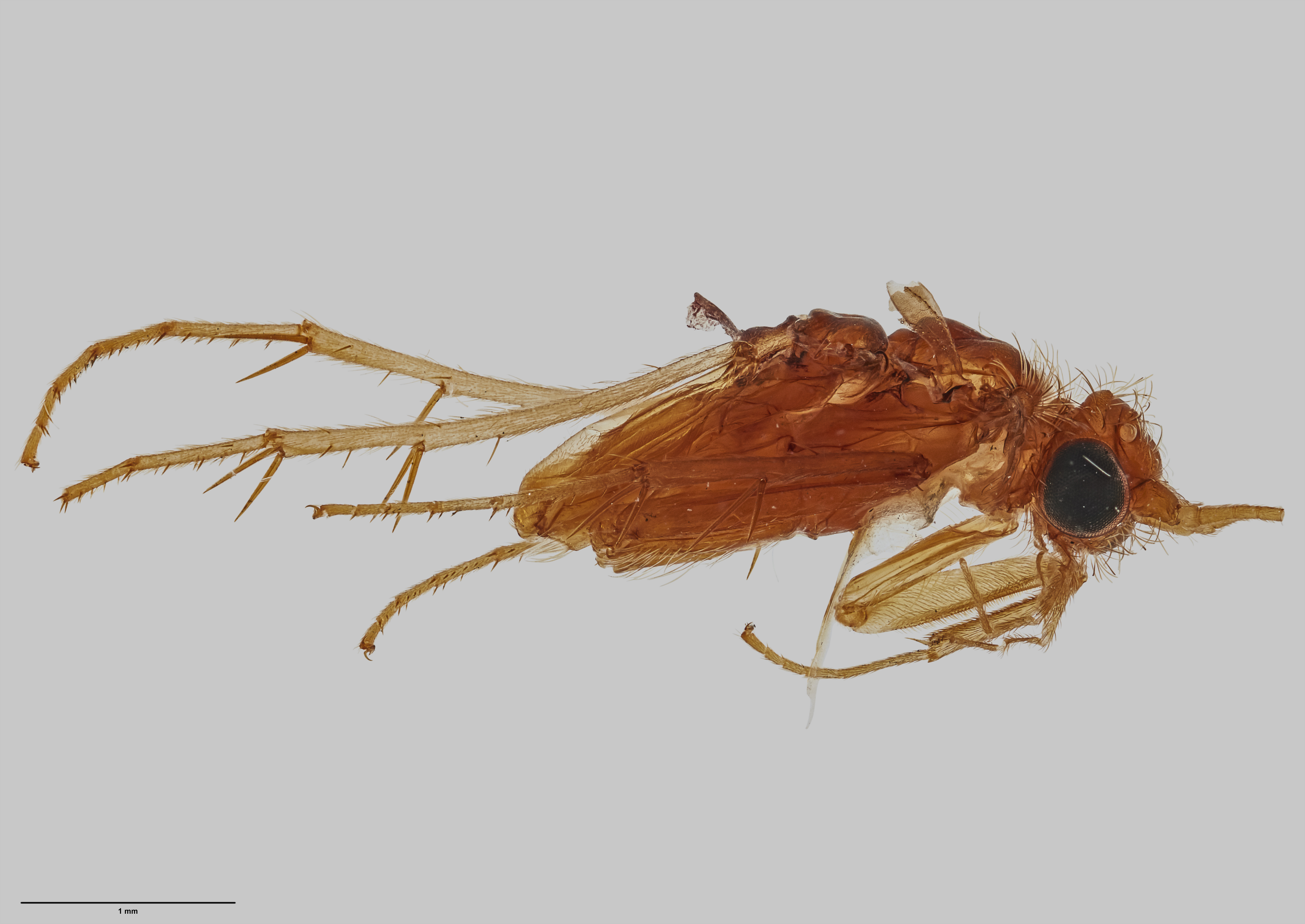
- Tiphobiosis kleinpastei

Scientific classification
- Kingdom: Animalia
- Phylum: Arthropoda
- Clade: Pancrustacea
- Class: Insecta
- Order: Trichoptera
- Family: Hydrobiosidae
- Genus: Tiphobiosis; Tillyard, 1924

Species
- See text

= Tiphobiosis =

Genus of insects

Tiphobiosis is a genus of caddisflies belonging to the family Hydrobiosidae. The genus was first recognised by Robert John Tillyard in 1924.

== Distribution ==
The genus is endemic to New Zealand.

== Species ==
- Tiphobiosis cataractae Ward, 1995
- Tiphobiosis childella Ward, 1995
- Tiphobiosis childi McFarlane, 1981
- Tiphobiosis cowiei Ward, 1991
- Tiphobiosis fulva Tillyard, 1924
- Tiphobiosis hinewai Ward, 1995
- Tiphobiosis intermedia Mosely, 1953
- Tiphobiosis kleinpastei Ward, 1998
- Tiphobiosis kuscheli Wise, 1972
- Tiphobiosis montana Tillyard, 1924
- Tiphobiosis plicosta McFarlane, 1960
- Tiphobiosis quadrifurca Ward, 1997
- Tiphobiosis salmoni McFarlane, 1981
- Tiphobiosis schmidi Ward, 1998
- Tiphobiosis trifurca McFarlane, 1981
- Tiphobiosis veniflex McFarlane, 1960
