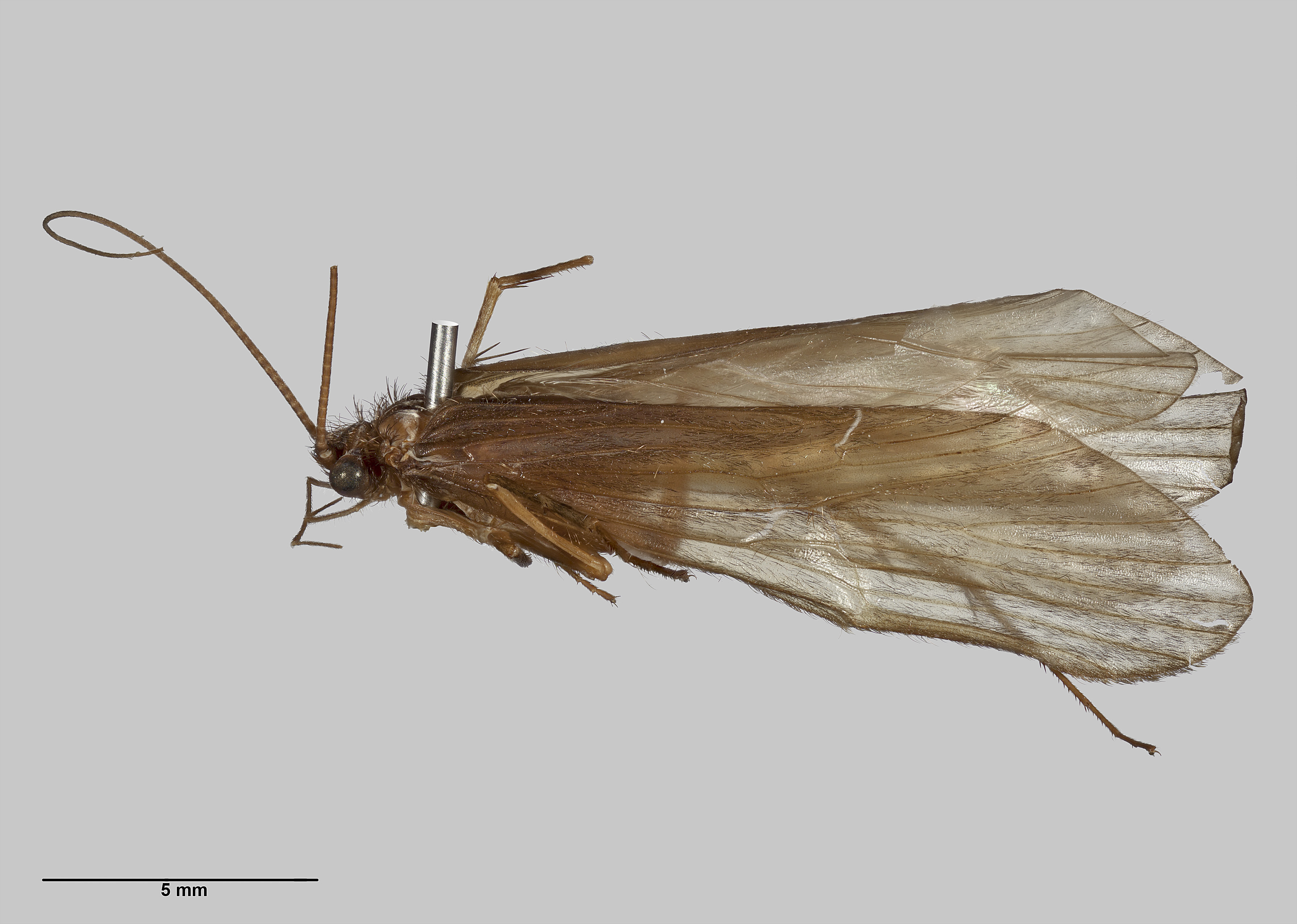
- Edpercivalia harrisoni Wise, 1982 specimen (holotype) held at Auckland Museum. Licensed under CC BY 4.0.

Scientific classification
- Kingdom: Animalia
- Phylum: Arthropoda
- Clade: Pancrustacea
- Class: Insecta
- Order: Trichoptera
- Family: Hydrobiosidae
- Subfamily: Hydrobiosinae
- Tribe: Hydrobiosini
- Genus: Edpercivalia; McFarlane, 1964

Species
- See text

= Edpercivalia =

Genus of caddisflies

Edpercivalia is a genus of insects known as caddisflies in the family Hydrobiosidae. This genus is endemic to New Zealand. The genus contains the following species:

- Edpercivalia banksiensis
- Edpercivalia borealis
- Edpercivalia cassicola
- Edpercivalia dugdalei
- Edpercivalia flintorum
- Edpercivalia fusca
- Edpercivalia harrisoni
- Edpercivalia maxima
- Edpercivalia morrisi
- Edpercivalia oriens
- Edpercivalia schistaria
- Edpercivalia shandi
- Edpercivalia smithi
- Edpercivalia spaini
- Edpercivalia tahatika
- Edpercivalia thomasoni
