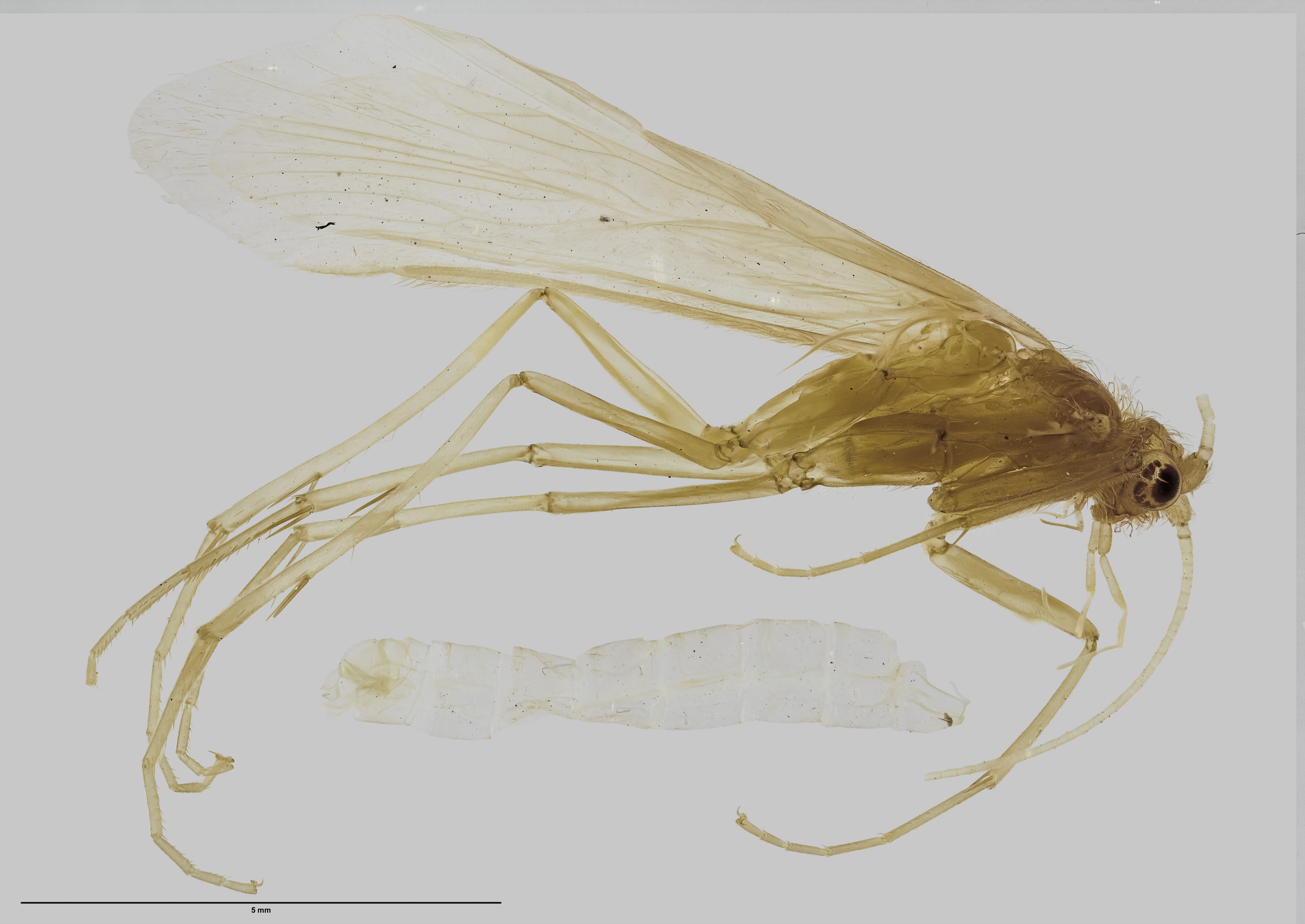
- Costachorema notopterum

Scientific classification
- Kingdom: Animalia
- Phylum: Arthropoda
- Clade: Pancrustacea
- Class: Insecta
- Order: Trichoptera
- Family: Hydrobiosidae
- Genus: Costachorema; McFarlane, 1939

Species
- See text

= Costachorema =

Genus of insects

Costachorema is a genus of caddisflies belonging to the family of Hydrobiosidae. The genus was first recognised by Alex G. McFarlane in 1939.

== Distribution ==
The genus is endemic to New Zealand.

== Species ==
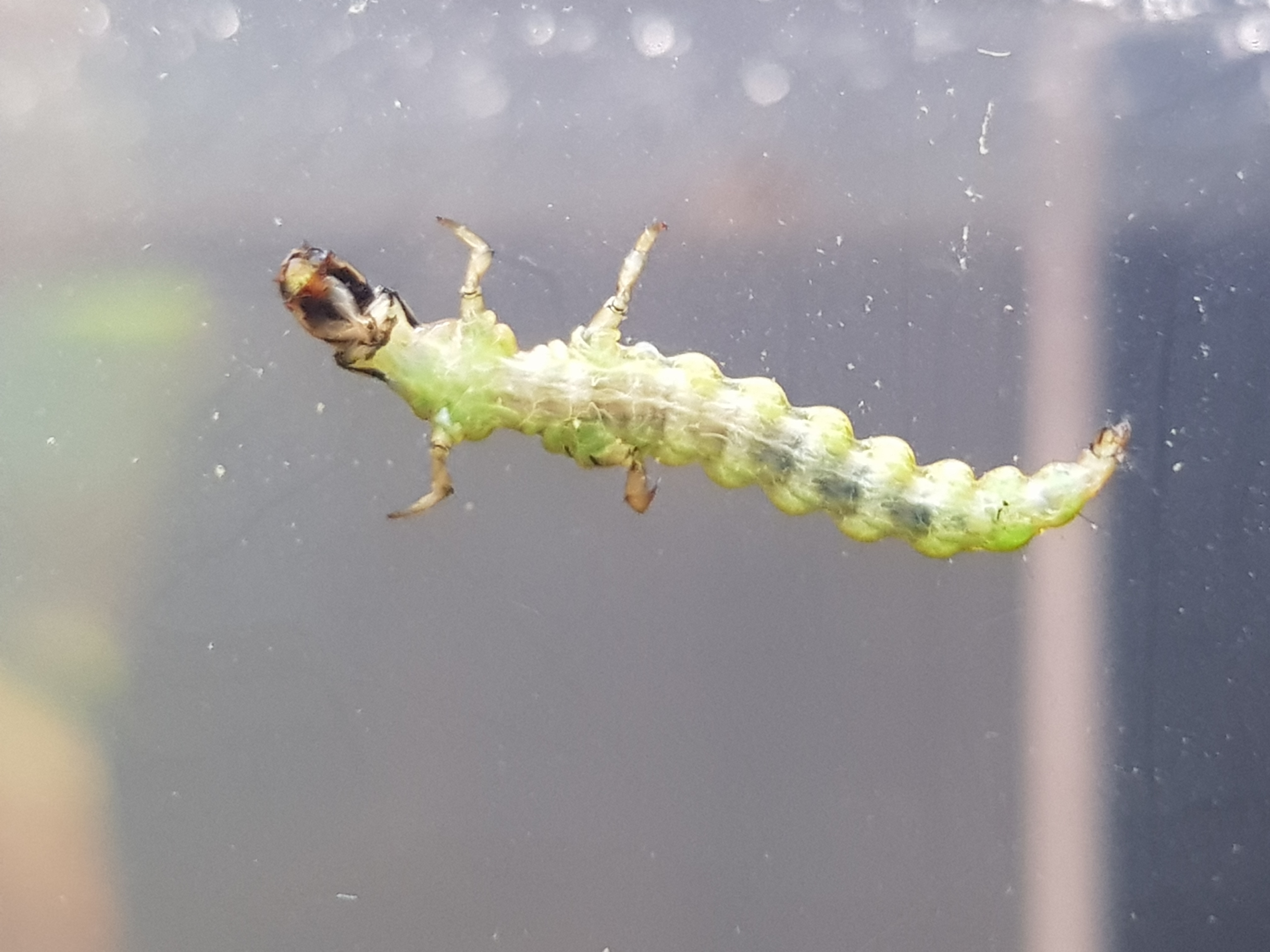
Larvae of Costachorema xanthopterum

- Costachorema brachypterum McFarlane, 1939
- Costachorema callistum McFarlane, 1939
- Costachorema hebdomon McFarlane, 1981
- Costachorema hecton McFarlane, 1981
- Costachorema notopterum Wise, 1972
- Costachorema peninsulae Ward, 1995
- Costachorema psaropterum McFarlane, 1939
- Costachorema xanthopterum McFarlane, 1939
