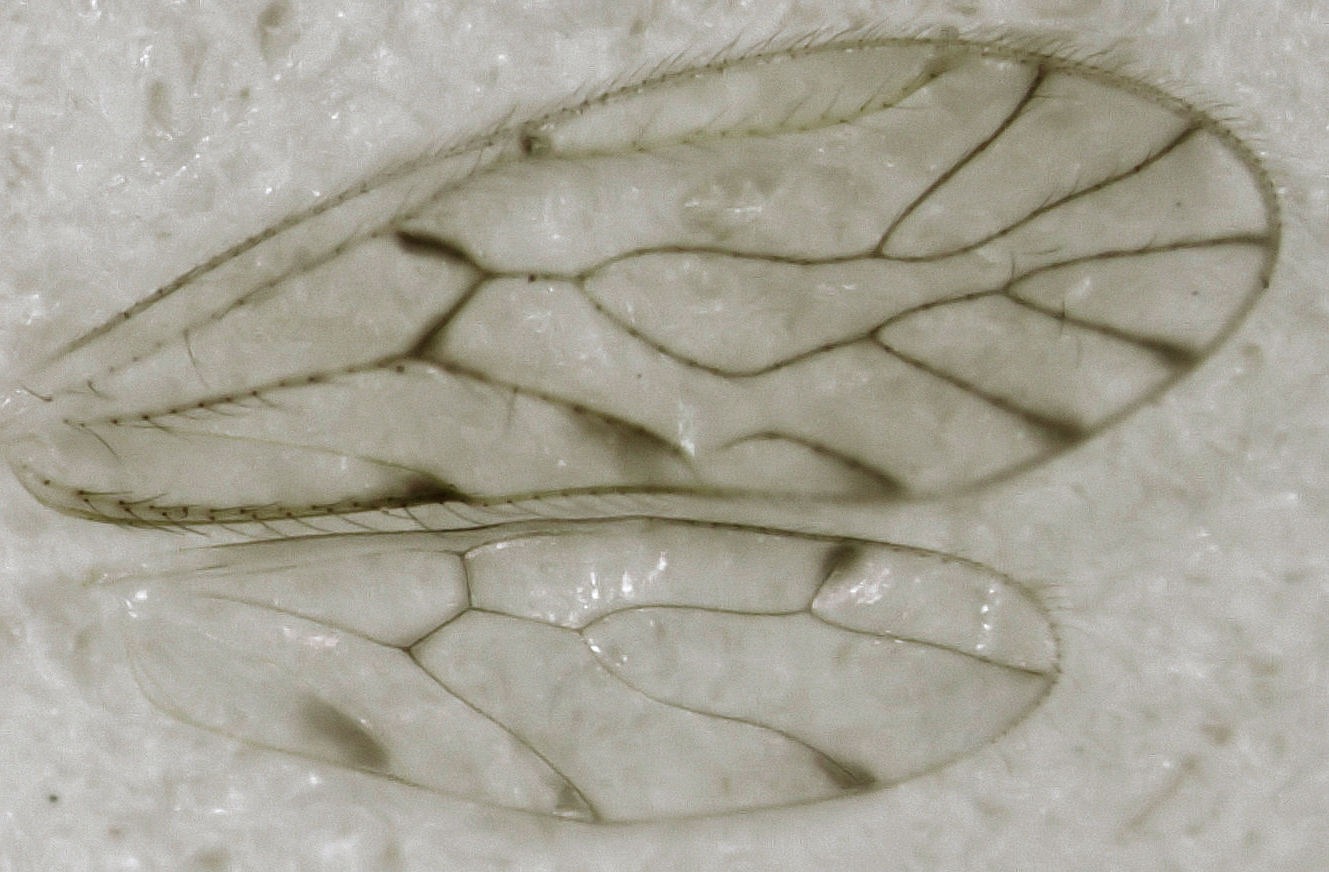
- Trichopsocus clarus (wings)

Scientific classification
- Kingdom: Animalia
- Phylum: Arthropoda
- Clade: Pancrustacea
- Class: Insecta
- Order: Psocodea
- Family: Trichopsocidae
- Genus: Trichopsocus
- Species: T. clarus

Binomial name
- Trichopsocus clarus (Banks, 1908)

= Trichopsocus clarus =

Species of booklouse

Trichopsocus clarus is a species of Psocodea (formerly Psocoptera) from the Trichopsocidae family. It can be found across Europe, in United Kingdom, Ireland, on Azores, Canary Islands, in Finland, France, Germany, Italy, Latvia, Madeira, Poland, Portugal, Spain, Sweden, Switzerland, and the Netherlands. The species are either yellow or orange coloured. It is also found in Australia and New Zealand.

== Habitat ==
The species is found on foliage of a range of trees.
