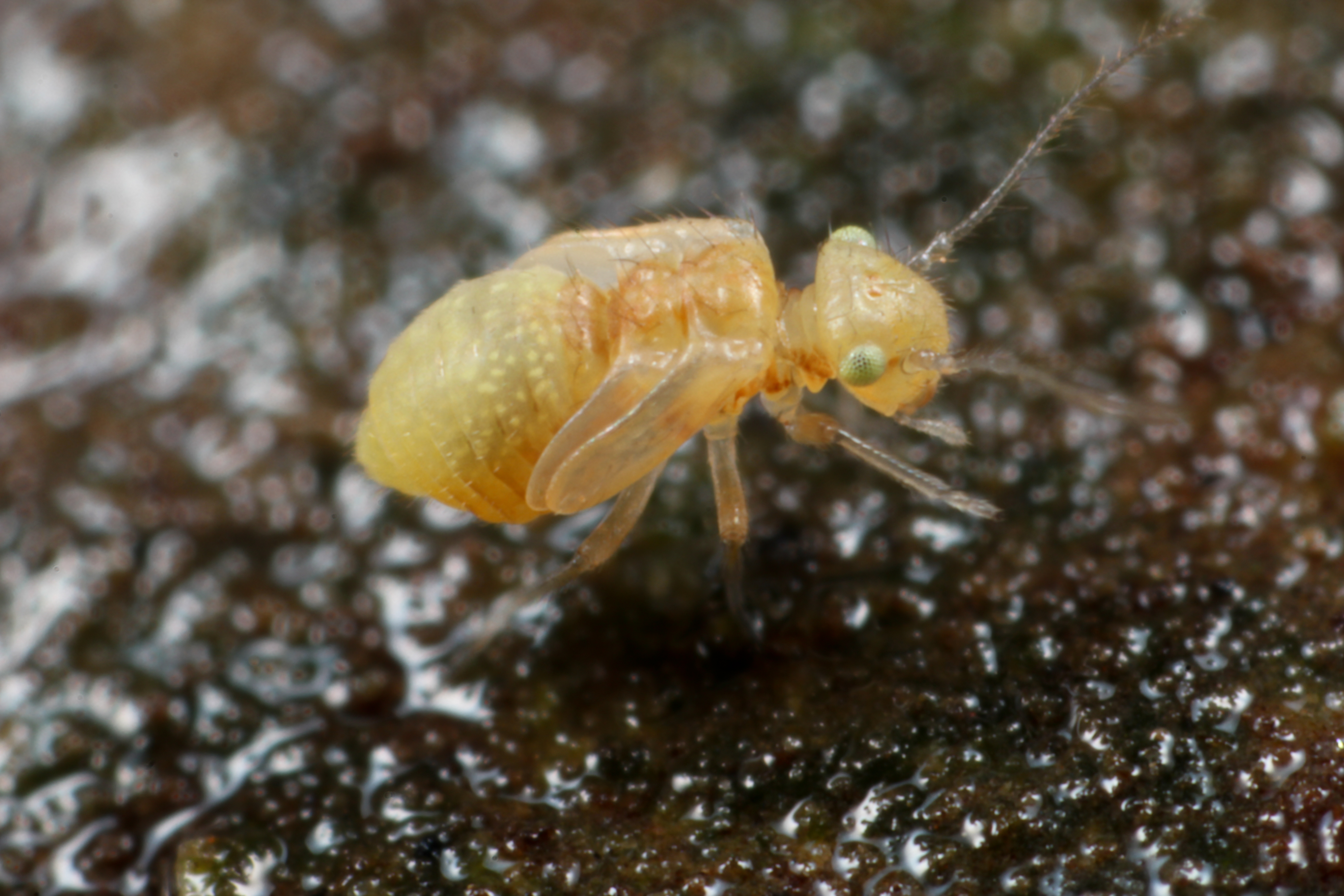
- Trichopsocus brincki

Scientific classification
- Domain: Eukaryota
- Kingdom: Animalia
- Phylum: Arthropoda
- Class: Insecta
- Order: Psocodea
- Family: Trichopsocidae
- Genus: Trichopsocus; Kolbe, 1882

= Trichopsocus =

Genus of booklice

Trichopsocus is a genus of lash-faced psocids in the family Trichopsocidae. There are about nine described species in Trichopsocus.

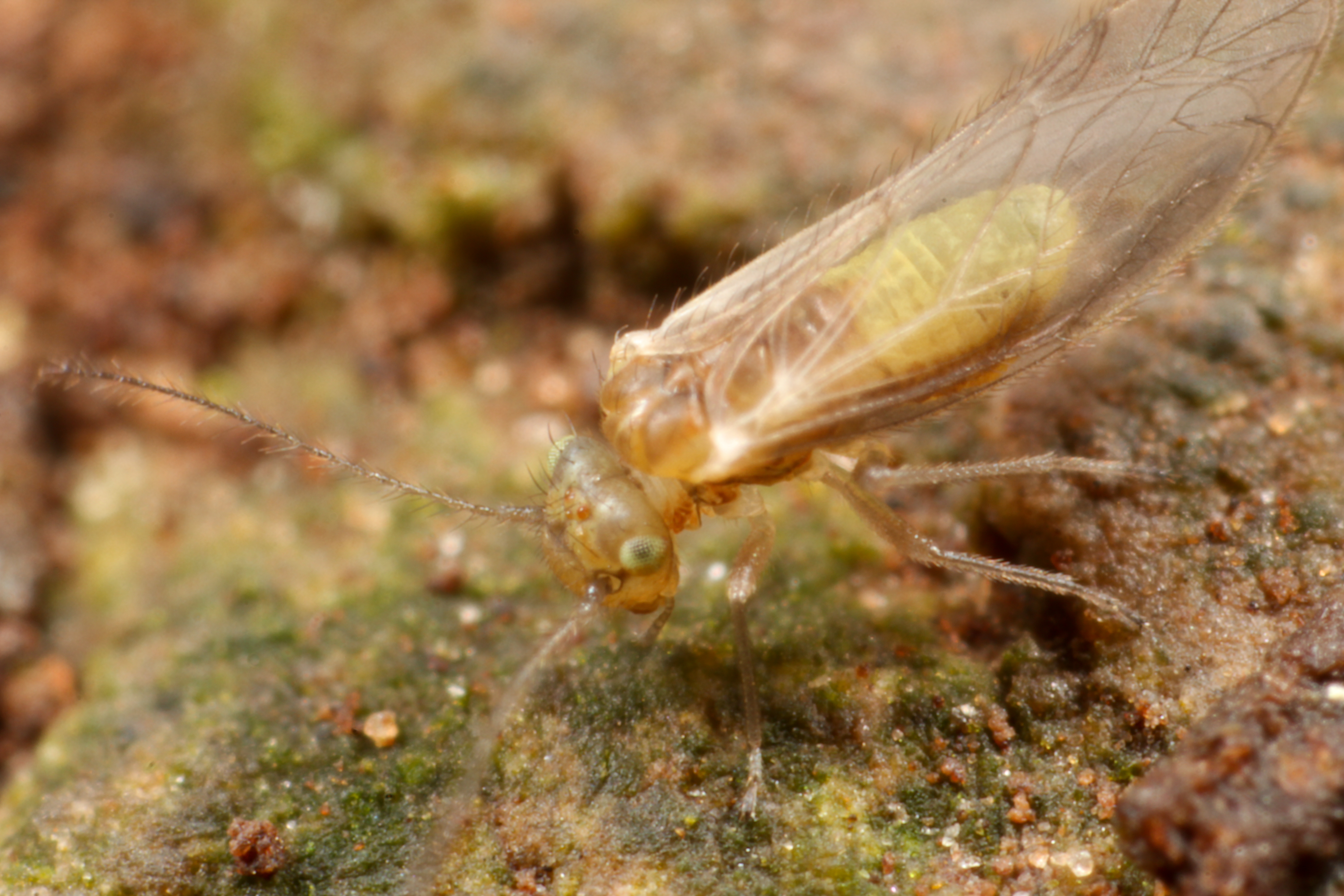
Trichopsocus brincki

== Species ==
These nine species belong to the genus Trichopsocus:

- Trichopsocus brincki Badonnel, 1963^{c g}
- Trichopsocus chilensis New & Thornton, 1981^{c g}
- Trichopsocus clarus (Banks, 1908)^{i c g b}
- Trichopsocus coloratus Lienhard, 1983^{c g}
- Trichopsocus dalii (McLachlan, 1867)^{i c g b}
- Trichopsocus difficilis Lienhard, 1996^{c g}
- Trichopsocus fastuosus (Navás, 1915)^{c g}
- Trichopsocus maculosus Mockford, 1969^{c g}
- Trichopsocus marmoratus (Hagen, 1865)^{c g}

Data sources: i = ITIS, c = Catalogue of Life, g = GBIF, b = Bugguide.net
