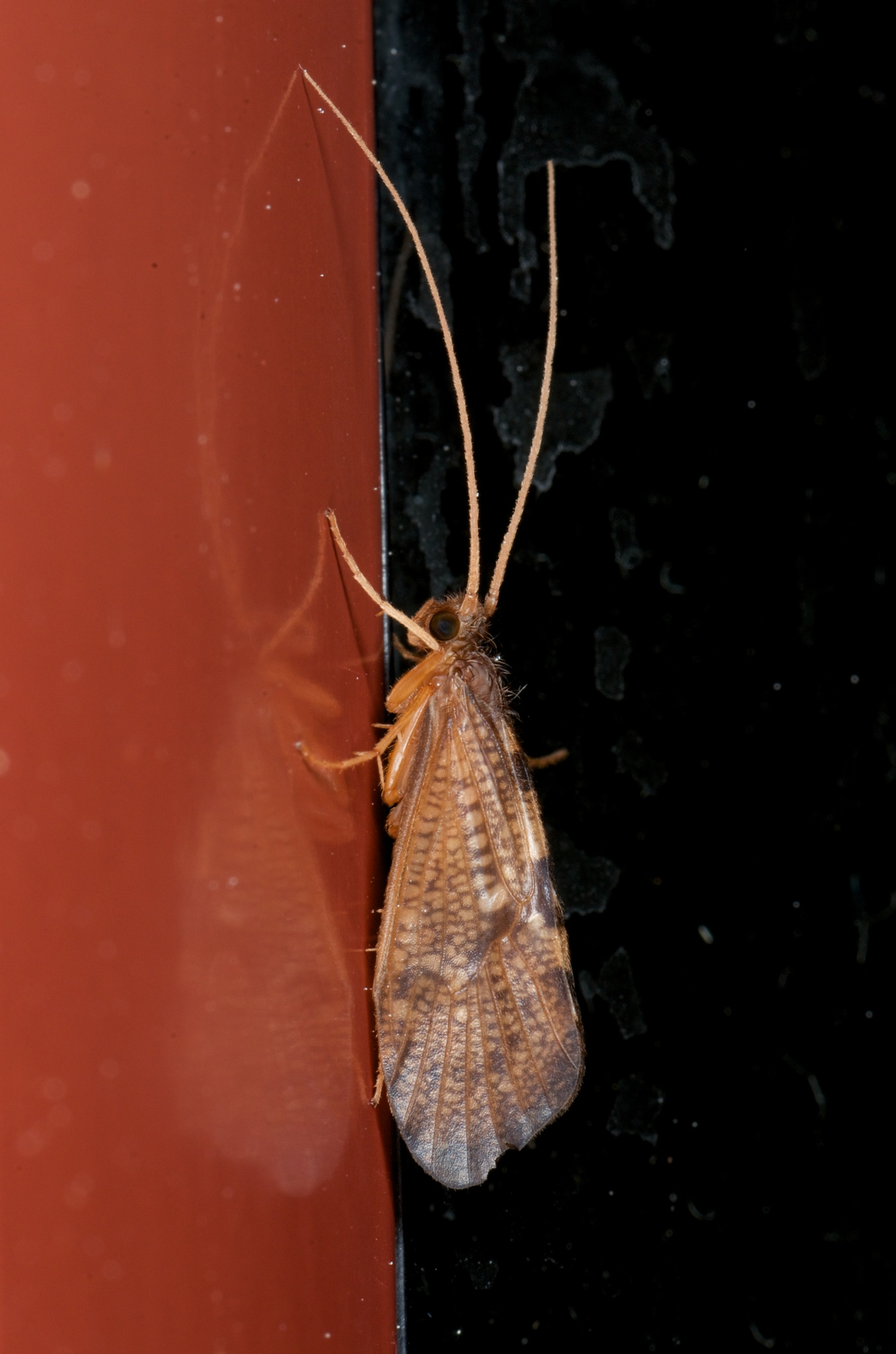
- Oeconesus maori, New Zealand

Scientific classification
- Kingdom: Animalia
- Phylum: Arthropoda
- Clade: Pancrustacea
- Class: Insecta
- Order: Trichoptera
- Family: Oeconesidae; Tillyard, 1921

= Oeconesidae =

Family of caddisflies

Oeconesidae is a family of caddisflies in the order Trichoptera. There are about 6 genera and 19 described species in Oeconesidae, found mainly in New Zealand. A single species, Tascuna ignota, is found in Tasmania.

== Taxonomy ==
Oeconesidae was first described by Robert John Tillyard in 1921. Tillyard designated Oeconesus, as the type genus of the family.

== Genera ==
These six genera belong to the family Oeconesidae:

- Oeconesus McLachlan, 1862
- Pseudoeconesus McLachlan, 1894
- Tarapsyche McFarlane, 1960
- Tascuna Neboiss, 1975
- Zelandopsyche Tillyard, 1921
- Zepsyche McFarlane, 1960
