= Robert McLachlan (entomologist) =

British entomologist (1837–1904)

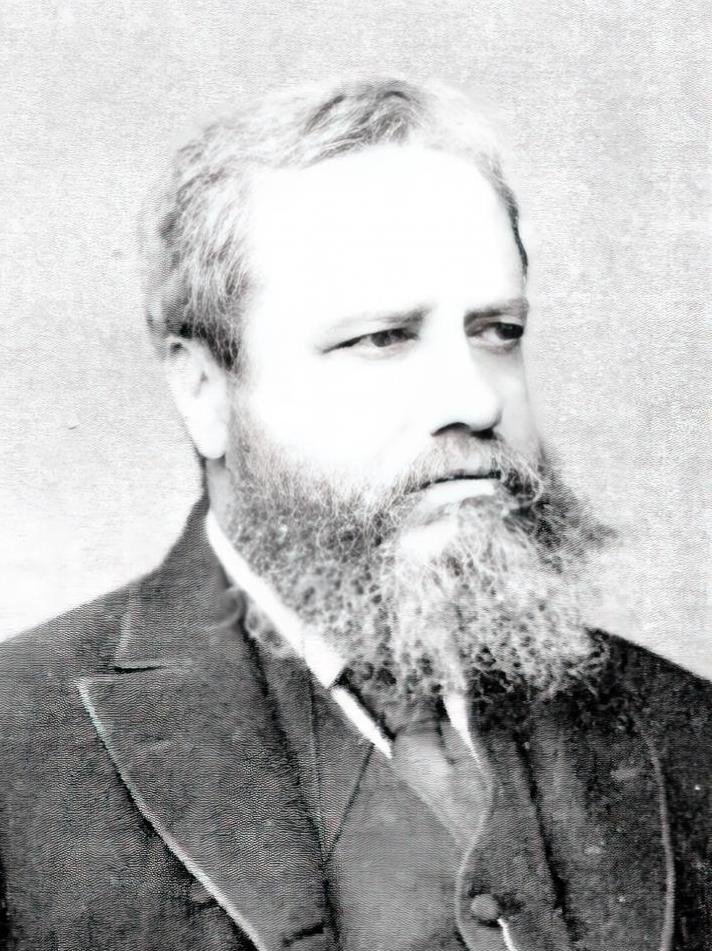
Robert McLachlan

Robert McLachlan FRS (10 April 1837 – 23 May 1904) was an English entomologist specializing in the study of lacewings (Neuroptera) and caddisflies (Trichoptera).

== Life ==
McLachlan was born in London on 10 April 1837, one of five children of Hugh McLachlan and Hannah (Thompson) McLachlan. His father was a successful manufacturer of ship chronometers. He lived his early life in Ongar, Essex, and was educated in Ilford at a private school where he developed a good knowledge of English, French and German. Due to a sizable inheritance, McLachlan was a man of independent means and devoted himself entirely to the study of entomology and other aspects of natural history. An initial interest in botany was prompted by a desire to understand the relationship between butterflies and their food plants.

In 1855, after a broken engagement, McLachlan traveled to New South Wales, Australia and Shanghai, China to study and collect botanical materials. On his return to England he enlisted the help of Robert Brown at the British Museum to identify the plants in his collection. An acquaintance with John Van Voorst influenced his focus on entomology and the work of Hermann August Hagen prompted him to study Neuroptera. He wrote his first paper on this order in 1861, including a description of a new British species. Other papers on lacewings followed, culminating with his Catalogue of British Neuroptera in 1870.

He next turned his attention to the collection and study of caddisflies (Trichoptera) becoming an acknowledged authority on this order. His greatest work was considered to be the Monographic Revision and Synopsis of the Trichoptera of the European Fauna (1874–84). Originally published in nine parts, it was illustrated by nearly 2000 of his own detailed drawings, made with a camera lucida. McLachlan had extensive connections with a worldwide community of entomologists and was able to build a collection of Neuroptera that was one of the largest in the world. He also had an extensive collection of butterflies, many of which were once common in Britain but had become rare or extinct.

McLachlan was the first editor of the review Entomologist's Monthly Magazine. He became a member of the Entomological Society of London in 1858, and served variously as secretary, treasurer and president. He was a member of the Linnean Society of London from 1862, and was elected to the Royal Society in 1877. He was also a member of the Zoological Society of London, the Royal Horticultural Society, a member of the council of the Ray Society and a member of various other British and foreign learned societies.

He died on 23 May 1904 in Lewisham, close to London. He is buried in Tower Hamlets Cemetery.

== Works ==
Among his publications are

- Monograph of the British species of caddis-flies (1865).
- Monograph of the British Neuroptera-Planipennia (1868).
- Monograph British Psocidae (1866-1867).
- Catalogue of British Neuroptera (1870).
- Monographic revision and synopsis of the Trichoptera of the European fauna (two volumes, 1874 & 1880).
