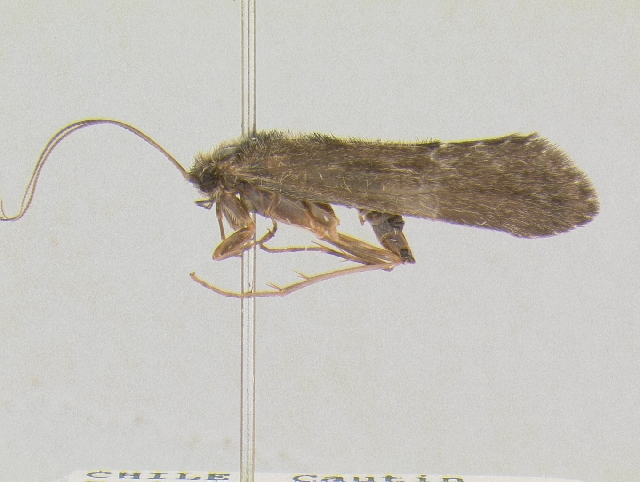

Scientific classification
- Kingdom: Animalia
- Phylum: Arthropoda
- Clade: Pancrustacea
- Class: Insecta
- Order: Trichoptera
- Superfamily: Rhyacophiloidea
- Family: Hydrobiosidae; Ulmer, 1905

Subfamilies, tribes and genera
- Apsilochoreminae: Allochorema; Apatanodes; Apsilochorema; Isochorema; Neopsilochorema; Hydrobiosinae: Hydrobiosini; Amphichorema; Androchorema; Atopsyche; Atrachorema; Australobiosis; Austrochorema; Cailloma; Clavichorema; Costachorema; Edpercivalia; Ethochorema; Heterochorema; Hydrobiosis; Hydrochorema; Iguazu; Ipsebiosis; Koetonga; Megogata; Metachorema; Microchorema; Neoatopsyche; Neochorema; Neurochorema; Parachorema; Poecilochorema; Pomphochorema; Pseudoradema; Psilochorema; Ptychobiosis; Rheochorema; Schajovskoya; Stenochorema; Synchorema; Tanjilana; Tanorus; Taschorema; Traillochorema; Ulmerochorema; Xanthochorema; Psyllobetini; Allobiosis; Moruya; Psyllobetina; Tiphobiosis

= Hydrobiosidae =

Family of caddisflies

The Hydrobiosidae are a family of caddisflies in the insect order Trichoptera. The family contains two subfamilies with about 50 genera.
