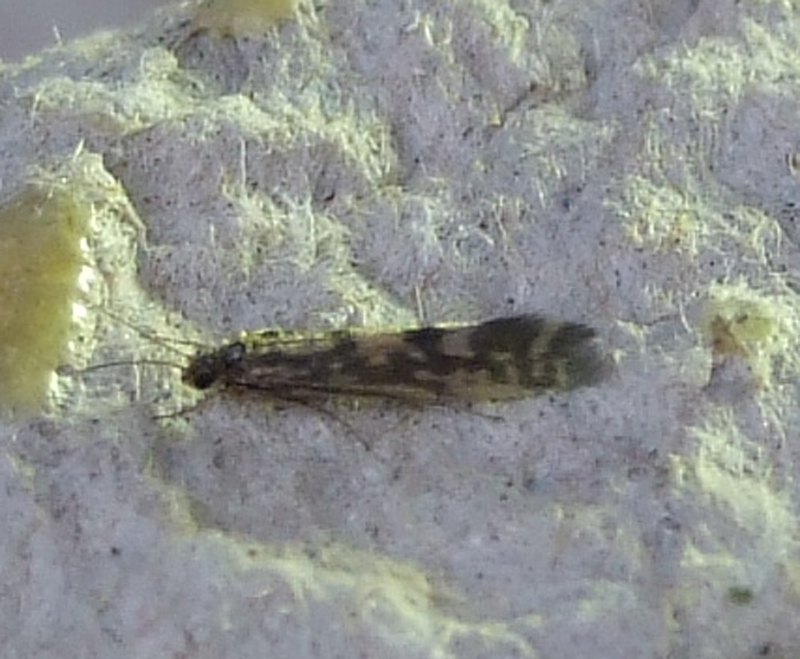
- Agraylea multipunctata

Scientific classification
- Domain: Eukaryota
- Kingdom: Animalia
- Phylum: Arthropoda
- Class: Insecta
- Order: Trichoptera
- Family: Hydroptilidae
- Subfamily: Hydroptilinae; Stephens, 1836

Tribes
- Hydroptilini Stephens, 1836; Leucotrichiini Flint, 1970; Neotrichiini Ross, 1956; Ochrotrichiini Marshall, 1979; Orthotrichiini Nielsen, 1948; Stactobiini Botosaneanu, 1956

= Hydroptilinae =

Subfamily of caddisflies

Hydroptilinae is a subfamily of the microcaddisflies in the family Hydroptilidae. The subfamily includes at least 60 genera and 1,600 described species.

The type genus for Hydroptilinae is Hydroptila,described by J.W. Dalman, 1819.

== Genera ==
These 65 genera belong to the subfamily Hydroptilinae:

- Abtrichia Mosely, 1939^{i c g}
- Acanthotrichia Wells, 1982^{i c g}
- Acostatrichia Mosely, 1939^{i c g}
- Acritoptila Wells, 1982^{i c g}
- Agraylea Curtis, 1834^{i c g b}
- Alisotrichia Flint, 1964^{i c g}
- Anchitrichia Flint, 1970^{i c g}
- Ascotrichia Flint, 1983^{i c g}
- Austratrichia Wells, 1982^{i c g}
- Betrichia Mosely, 1939^{i c g}
- Bredinia Flint, 1968^{i c g}
- Byrsopteryx Flint, 1981^{i c g}
- Caledonotrichia Sykora, 1967^{i c g}
- Catoxyethira Ulmer, 1912^{i c g}
- Celaenotrichia Mosely, 1934^{i c g}
- Cerasmatrichia Flint, Harris & Botosaneanu, 1994^{i c g}
- Ceratotrichia Flint in Quintero & Aiello, 1992^{i c g}
- Chrysotrichia Schmid, 1958^{i c g}
- Costatrichia Mosely, 1937^{i c g}
- Cyclopsiella Kjaerandsen, 1997^{i c g}
- Dhatrichia Mosely, 1948^{i c g}
- Dibusa Ross, 1939^{i c g}
- Dicaminus Mueller, 1879^{i c g}
- Eutonella Mueller, 1921^{i c g}
- Flintiella Angrisano, 1995^{i c g}
- Hellyethira Neboiss, 1977^{i c g}
- Hydroptila Dalman, 1819^{i c g b}
- Hydroptilina Martynov, 1934^{i c g}
- Ithytrichia Eaton, 1873^{i c g}
- Jabitrichia Wells, 1990^{i c g}
- Kumanskiella Harris & Flint, 1992^{i c g}
- Leucotrichia Mosely, 1934^{i c g}
- Macrostactobia Schmid, 1958^{i c g}
- Mayatrichia Mosely, 1937^{i c g}
- Maydenoptila Neboiss, 1977^{i c g}
- Mejicanotrichia Harris & Holzenthal, 1997^{i c g}
- Metrichia Ross, 1938^{i c g}
- Microptila Ris, 1897^{i c g}
- Missitrichia Wells, 1991^{i c g}
- Mulgravia Wells, 1982^{i c g}
- Neotrichia Morton, 1905^{i c g}
- Niuginitrichia Wells, 1990^{i c g}
- Nothotrichia Flint, 1967^{i c g}
- Ochrotrichia Mosely, 1934^{i c g b}
- Orphninotrichia Mosely, 1934^{i c g}
- Orthotrichia Eaton, 1873^{i c g}
- Oxyethira Eaton, 1873^{i c g b}
- Parastactobia Schmid, 1958^{i c g}
- Paroxyethira Mosely, 1924^{i c g}
- Paucicalcaria Mathis & Bowles, 1989^{i c g}
- Peltopsyche Mueller, 1879^{i c g}
- Plethus Hagen, 1887^{i c g}
- Rhyacopsyche Mueller, 1879^{i c g}
- Scelobotrichia Harris & Bueno-Soria, 1993^{i c g}
- Scelotrichia Ulmer, 1951^{i c g}
- Stactobia McLachlan, 1880^{i c g}
- Stactobiella Martynov, 1924^{i c g}
- Tangatrichia Wells & Andersen, 1995^{i c g}
- Taraxitrichia Flint & Harris, 1991^{i c g}
- Tricholeiochiton Kloet & Hincks, 1944^{i c g}
- Ugandatrichia Mosely, 1939^{i c g}
- Vietrichia Olah, 1989^{i c g}
- Wlitrichia Kjaerandsen, 1997^{i c g}
- Xuthotrichia Mosely, 1934^{i c g}
- Zumatrichia Mosely, 1937^{i c g}

Data sources: i = ITIS, c = Catalogue of Life, g = GBIF, b = Bugguide.net

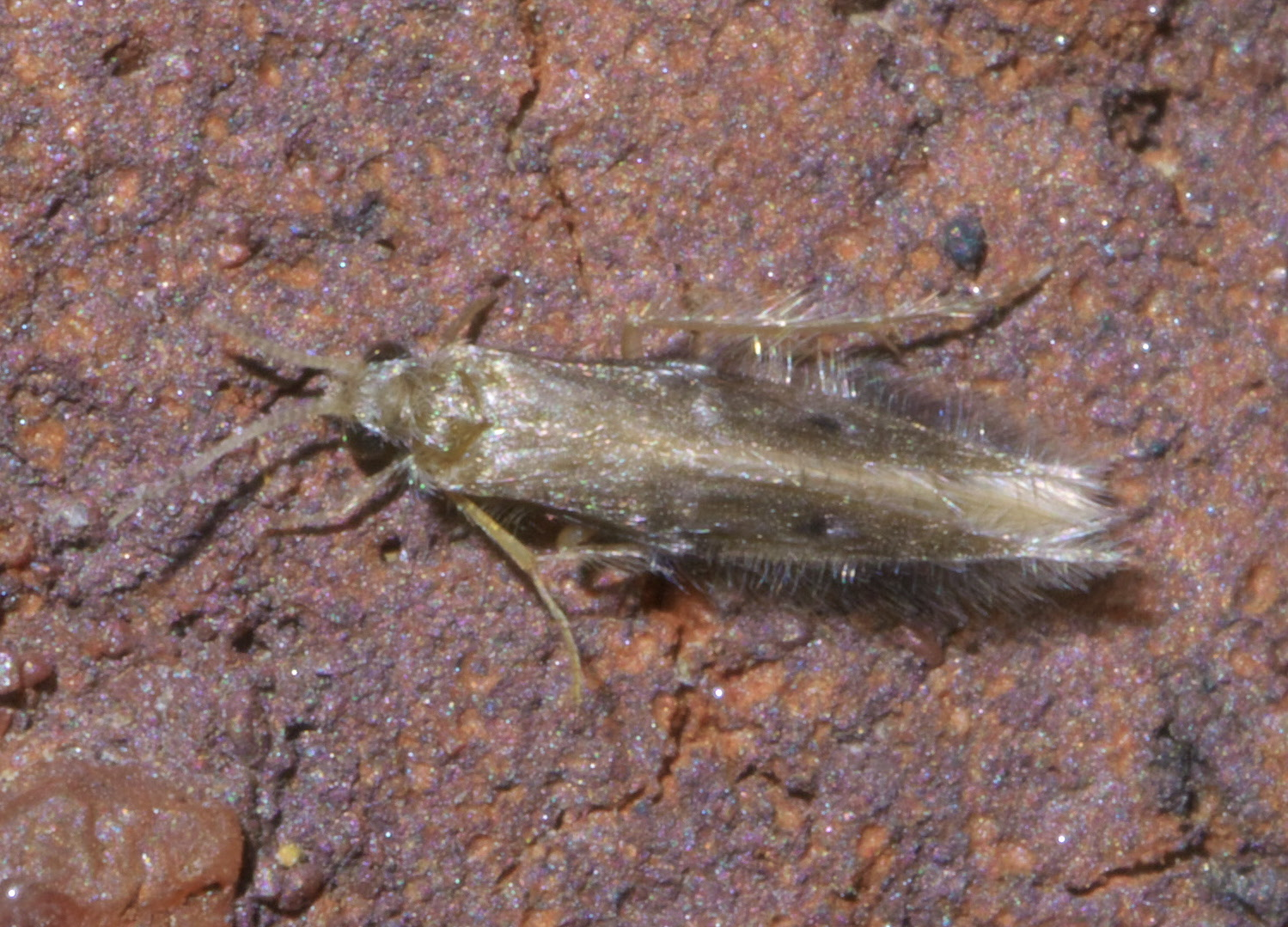
Oxyethira
