= List of Oxyethira species =

This is a list of 197 species in Oxyethira, a genus of microcaddisflies in the family Hydroptilidae.

== Oxyethira species ==
- Oxyethira abacatia Denning, 1947^{i c g}
- Oxyethira absona Flint, 1991^{i c g}
- Oxyethira acegua Angrisano, 1995^{i c g}
- Oxyethira aculea Ross, 1941^{i c g}
- Oxyethira acuta Kobayashi, 1977^{i c g}
- Oxyethira aeola Ross, 1938^{i c g}
- Oxyethira ahipara Wise, 1998^{i c g}
- Oxyethira alaluz Botosaneanu, 1980^{i c g}
- Oxyethira albaeaquae Botosaneanu, 1995^{i c g}
- Oxyethira albiceps (McLachlan, 1862)^{i c g}
- Oxyethira allagashensis Blickle, 1963^{i c g}
- Oxyethira anabola Blickle, 1966^{i c g}
- Oxyethira andina Kelley, 1983^{i c g}
- Oxyethira angustella Martynov, 1933^{i c g}
- Oxyethira apinolada Holzenthal & Harris, 1992^{i c g}
- Oxyethira araya Ross, 1941^{i c g}
- Oxyethira archaica Malicky, 1975^{i c g}
- Oxyethira arctodactyla Kelley, 1983^{i c g}
- Oxyethira argentinensis Flint, 1982^{i c g}
- Oxyethira arizona Ross, 1948^{i c g}
- Oxyethira artuvillosus (Wells, 1981)^{i c g}
- Oxyethira aspera Yang & Kelley in Yang, Kelley & Morse, 1997^{i c g}
- Oxyethira assia Botosaneanu & Moubayed, 1985^{i c g}
- Oxyethira azteca (Mosely, 1937)^{i c g}
- Oxyethira bamaga ^{g}
- Oxyethira baritu Angrisano, 1995^{i c g}
- Oxyethira bicornuta Kelley, 1983^{i c g}
- Oxyethira bidentata Mosely, 1934^{i c g}
- Oxyethira bifurcata Yang & Kelley in Yang, Kelley & Morse, 1997^{i c g}
- Oxyethira bogambara Schmid, 1958^{i c g}
- Oxyethira boreella Svensson & Tjeder, 1975^{i c g}
- Oxyethira braziliensis Kelley, 1983^{i c g}
- Oxyethira brevis Wells, 1981^{i c g}
- Oxyethira burkina Gibon, Guenda & Coulibaly, 1994^{i c g}
- Oxyethira caledoniensis Kelley, 1989^{i c g}
- Oxyethira calori ^{g}
- Oxyethira campanula Botosaneanu, 1970^{i c g}
- Oxyethira campesina Botosaneanu, 1977^{i c g}
- Oxyethira circarverna Kelley, 1983^{g}
- Oxyethira circaverna Kelley, 1983^{i c g}
- Oxyethira coercens Morton, 1905^{i c g}
- Oxyethira colombiensis Kelley, 1983^{i c g}
- Oxyethira columba (Neboiss, 1977)^{i c g}
- Oxyethira complicata Wells, 1990^{i c g}
- Oxyethira copina Angrisano, 1995^{i c g}
- Oxyethira cornuta Wells, 1990^{i c g}
- Oxyethira costaricensis Kelley, 1983^{i c g}
- Oxyethira cotula Wells & Dudgeon, 1990^{i c g}
- Oxyethira cuernuda Holzenthal & Harris, 1992^{i c g}
- Oxyethira culebra Holzenthal & Harris, 1992^{i c g}
- Oxyethira dactylonedys Kelley, 1983^{i c g}
- Oxyethira dalmeria (Mosely, 1937)^{i c g}
- Oxyethira datra Olah, 1989^{i c g}
- Oxyethira delcourti Jacquemart, 1973^{i c g}
- Oxyethira desadorna Moulton & Harris, 1997^{i c g}
- Oxyethira discaelata Kelley, 1983^{i c g}
- Oxyethira distinctella McLachlan, 1880^{i c g}
- Oxyethira dorsennus Kelley, 1989^{i c g}
- Oxyethira dualis Morton, 1905^{i c g}
- Oxyethira dunbartonensis Kelley, 1981^{i c g}
- Oxyethira ecornuta Morton, 1893^{i c g}
- Oxyethira efatensis Kelley, 1989^{i c g}
- Oxyethira elerobi (Blickle, 1961)^{i c g}
- Oxyethira espinada Holzenthal & Harris, 1992^{i c g}
- Oxyethira ezoensis Kobayashi, 1977^{i c g}
- Oxyethira falcata Morton, 1893^{i c g}
- Oxyethira fijiensis Kelley, 1989^{i c g}
- Oxyethira flagellata Jacquemart, 1963^{i c g}
- Oxyethira flavicornis (Pictet, 1834)^{i c g}
- Oxyethira florida Denning, 1947^{i c g}
- Oxyethira forcipata Mosely, 1934^{i c g b}
- Oxyethira frici Klapalek, 1891^{i c g}
- Oxyethira galekoluma Schmid, 1958^{i c g}
- Oxyethira garifosa Moulton & Harris, 1997^{i c g}
- Oxyethira glasa (Ross, 1941)^{i c g}
- Oxyethira gomera Kelley, 1984^{i c g}
- Oxyethira gracilianoi ^{g}
- Oxyethira grisea Betten, 1934^{i c g}
- Oxyethira guariba ^{g}
- Oxyethira hainanensis Yang & Xue, 1992^{i c g}
- Oxyethira harpagella Kimmins, 1951^{i c g}
- Oxyethira harpeodes Yang & Kelley in Yang, Kelley & Morse, 1997^{i c g}
- Oxyethira hartigi Moretti, 1981^{i c g}
- Oxyethira hilosa Holzenthal & Harris, 1992^{i c g}
- Oxyethira hozosa Harris & Davenport, 1999^{i c g}
- Oxyethira hyalina (Mueller, 1879)^{i c g}
- Oxyethira iannuzzae ^{g}
- Oxyethira iglesiasi Gonzalez & Terra, 1982^{i c g}
- Oxyethira ikal Wells & Huisman, 1992^{i c g}
- Oxyethira inaequispina Flint, 1990^{i c g}
- Oxyethira incana Ulmer, 1906^{i c g}
- Oxyethira indorsennus Kelley, 1989^{i c g}
- Oxyethira insularis Kelley, 1989^{i c g}
- Oxyethira itascae Monson & Holzenthal, 1993^{i c g}
- Oxyethira jamaicensis Flint, 1968^{i c g}
- Oxyethira janella Denning, 1948^{i c g}
- Oxyethira josifovi Kumanski, 1990^{i c g}
- Oxyethira kelleyi Harris in Harris & Armitage, 1987^{i c g}
- Oxyethira kingi Holzenthal & Kelley, 1983^{i c g}
- Oxyethira klingstedti Nybom, 1982^{i c g}
- Oxyethira lagunita Flint, 1982^{i c g}
- Oxyethira lobophora Mey, 1998^{i c g}
- Oxyethira longipenis ^{g}
- Oxyethira longispinosa Kumanski, 1987^{i c g}
- Oxyethira longissima Flint, 1974^{i c g}
- Oxyethira luanae ^{g}
- Oxyethira lumipollex Kelley & Harris, 1983^{i c g}
- Oxyethira lumosa Ross, 1948^{i c g}
- Oxyethira macrosterna Flint, 1974^{i c g}
- Oxyethira maryae Kelley, 1983^{i c g}
- Oxyethira matadero Harper & Turcotte, 1985^{i c g}
- Oxyethira maya Denning, 1947^{i c g}
- Oxyethira melasma Kelley, 1989^{i c g}
- Oxyethira merga Kelley, 1983^{i c g}
- Oxyethira michiganensis Mosely, 1934^{i c g}
- Oxyethira mienica Wells, 1981^{i c g}
- Oxyethira minima (Kimmins, 1951)^{i c g}
- Oxyethira mirabilis Morton, 1904^{i c g}
- Oxyethira mirebalina Botosaneanu, 1991^{i c g}
- Oxyethira misionensis Angrisano, 1995^{i c g}
- Oxyethira mithi Malicky, 1974^{i c g}
- Oxyethira mocoi Angrisano, 1995^{i c g}
- Oxyethira novasota Ross, 1944^{i c g}
- Oxyethira obscura Flint, 1974^{i c g}
- Oxyethira obtatus Denning, 1947^{i c g}
- Oxyethira orellanai Harris & Davenport, 1992^{i c g}
- Oxyethira oropedion Kelley, 1989^{i c g}
- Oxyethira ortizorum Botosaneanu, 1995^{i c g}
- Oxyethira pallida (Banks, 1904)^{i c g b}
- Oxyethira paramartha Schmid, 1960^{i c g}
- Oxyethira parazteca Kelley, 1983^{i c g}
- Oxyethira parce (Edwards & Arnold, 1961)^{i c g}
- Oxyethira paritentacula Kelley, 1983^{i c g}
- Oxyethira peruviana Harris & Davenport, 1999^{i c g}
- Oxyethira petei Angrisano, 1995^{i c g}
- Oxyethira picita Harris & Davenport, 1999^{i c g}
- Oxyethira pirisinui Moretti, 1981^{i c g}
- Oxyethira plumosa (Wells, 1981)^{i c}
- Oxyethira presilla Harris & Davenport, 1999^{i c g}
- Oxyethira pseudofalcata Ivanov, 1992^{i c g}
- Oxyethira puertoricensis Flint, 1964^{i c g}
- Oxyethira quinquaginta Kelley, 1983^{i c g}
- Oxyethira rachanee Chantaramongkol & Malicky, 1986^{i c g}
- Oxyethira ramosa Martynov, 1935^{i c g}
- Oxyethira rareza Holzenthal & Harris, 1992^{i c g}
- Oxyethira retracta Wells, 1981^{i c g}
- Oxyethira retrosa ^{g}
- Oxyethira ritae Angrisano, 1995^{i c g}
- Oxyethira rivicola Blickle & Morse, 1954^{i c g}
- Oxyethira roberti Harper & Roy, 1980^{i c g}
- Oxyethira rossi Blickle & Morse, 1957^{i c g}
- Oxyethira sagittifera Ris, 1897^{i c g}
- Oxyethira santiagensis Flint, 1982^{i c g}
- Oxyethira savanniensis Kelley & Harris, 1983^{i c g}
- Oxyethira scaeodactyla Kelley, 1983^{i c g}
- Oxyethira scutica Kelley, 1989^{i c g}
- Oxyethira sechellensis Malicky, 1993^{i c g}
- Oxyethira sencilla Holzenthal & Harris, 1992^{i c g}
- Oxyethira septentrionalis ^{g}
- Oxyethira serrata Ross, 1938^{i c g}
- Oxyethira setosa Denning, 1947^{i c g}
- Oxyethira sichuanensis Yang & Kelley in Yang, Kelley & Morse, 1997^{i c g}
- Oxyethira sida Blickle & Morse, 1954^{i c g}
- Oxyethira sierruca Holzenthal & Harris, 1992^{i c g}
- Oxyethira simplex Ris, 1897^{i c g}
- Oxyethira simulatrix Flint, 1968^{i c g}
- Oxyethira singularis ^{g}
- Oxyethira sininsigne Kelley, 1981^{i c g}
- Oxyethira sinistra ^{g}
- Oxyethira smolpela Wells, 1991^{i c g}
- Oxyethira spinosella McLachlan, 1884^{i c g}
- Oxyethira spirogyrae (Mueller, 1879)^{i c g}
- Oxyethira spissa Kelley, 1983^{i c g}
- Oxyethira tamperensis Malicky, 1999^{i c g}
- Oxyethira tasmaniensis Wells, 1998^{i c g}
- Oxyethira tega Flint, 1968^{i c g}
- Oxyethira teixeirai Harris & Davenport, 1992^{i c g}
- Oxyethira tenei Gibon, Guenda & Coulibaly, 1994^{i c g}
- Oxyethira tenuella Martynov, 1924^{i c g}
- Oxyethira tica Holzenthal & Harris, 1992^{i c g}
- Oxyethira torresiana ^{g}
- Oxyethira touba Gibon, 1988^{i c g}
- Oxyethira triangulata Wells, 1981^{i c g}
- Oxyethira tristella Klapalek, 1895^{i c g}
- Oxyethira tropis Yang & Kelley in Yang, Kelley & Morse, 1997^{i c g}
- Oxyethira ulmeri Mosely, 1937^{i c g}
- Oxyethira unidentata McLachlan, 1884^{i c g}
- Oxyethira unispina Flint, 1974^{i c g}
- Oxyethira vaina Harris & Davenport, 1999^{i c g}
- Oxyethira velocipes (Barnard, 1934)^{i c g}
- Oxyethira verna Ross, 1938^{i c g}
- Oxyethira vipera Kelley, 1983^{i c g}
- Oxyethira volsella Yang & Kelley in Yang, Kelley & Morse, 1997^{i c g}
- Oxyethira waipoua Wise, 1998^{i c g}
- Oxyethira warramunga Wells, 1985^{i c g}
- Oxyethira zeronia Ross, 1941^{i c g b}
- Oxyethira zilaba (Mosely, 1939)^{i c g}

Data sources: i = ITIS, c = Catalogue of Life, g = GBIF, b = Bugguide.net
