= Oxyethira forcipata =

Scientific classification
- Kingdom: Animalia
- Phylum: Arthropoda
- Class: Insecta
- Order: Trichoptera
- Family: Hydroptilidae
- Genus: Oxyethira
- Species: O. forcipata

Binomial name
- Oxyethira forcipata Mosely, 1934

Species of caddisfly

Oxyethira forcipata is a species of microcaddisfly in the family Hydroptilidae. It is found in North America.
