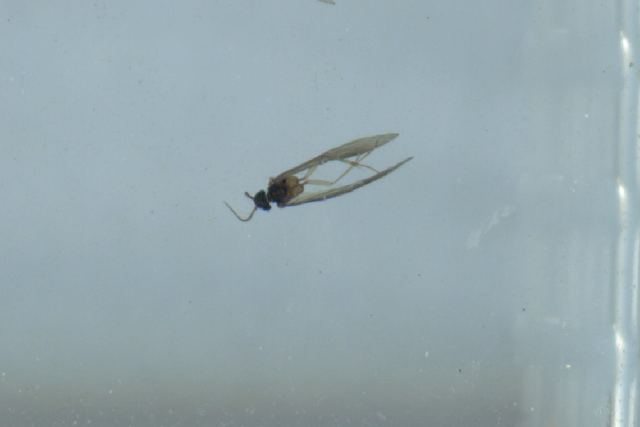
- Allotrichia

Scientific classification
- Kingdom: Animalia
- Phylum: Arthropoda
- Clade: Pancrustacea
- Class: Insecta
- Order: Trichoptera
- Family: Hydroptilidae
- Genus: Allotrichia; McLachlan, 1880

= Allotrichia =

Genus of caddisflies

Allotrichia is a genus of insect belonging to the family Hydroptilidae.

The genus was first described by McLachlan in 1880.

The species of this genus are found in Europe.

Species:

- Allotrichia laerma Malicky, 1976 - East Aegean Island, Greece
- Allotrichia militsa Malicky, 1992 - mainland Greece
- Allotrichia pallicornis
