= Ochrotrichia tenuata =

Scientific classification
- Kingdom: Animalia
- Phylum: Arthropoda
- Class: Insecta
- Order: Trichoptera
- Family: Hydroptilidae
- Genus: Ochrotrichia
- Species: O. tenuata

Binomial name
- Ochrotrichia tenuata Blickle & Denning, 1977

Species of caddisfly

Ochrotrichia tenuata is a species of microcaddisfly in the family Hydroptilidae. It is found in North America.
