= Hydroptila rono =

Scientific classification
- Domain: Eukaryota
- Kingdom: Animalia
- Phylum: Arthropoda
- Class: Insecta
- Order: Trichoptera
- Family: Hydroptilidae
- Genus: Hydroptila
- Species: H. rono

Binomial name
- Hydroptila rono Ross, 1941

Species of caddisfly

Hydroptila rono is a species of microcaddisfly in the family Hydroptilidae. It is found in North America.
