= Hydroptila armata =

Scientific classification
- Domain: Eukaryota
- Kingdom: Animalia
- Phylum: Arthropoda
- Class: Insecta
- Order: Trichoptera
- Family: Hydroptilidae
- Genus: Hydroptila
- Species: H. armata

Binomial name
- Hydroptila armata Ross, 1938

Species of caddisfly

Hydroptila armata is a species in the family Hydroptilidae ("microcaddisflies"), in the order Trichoptera ("caddisflies"). Hydroptila armata is found in North America.

== Notes ==
- Type locality: United States of America
