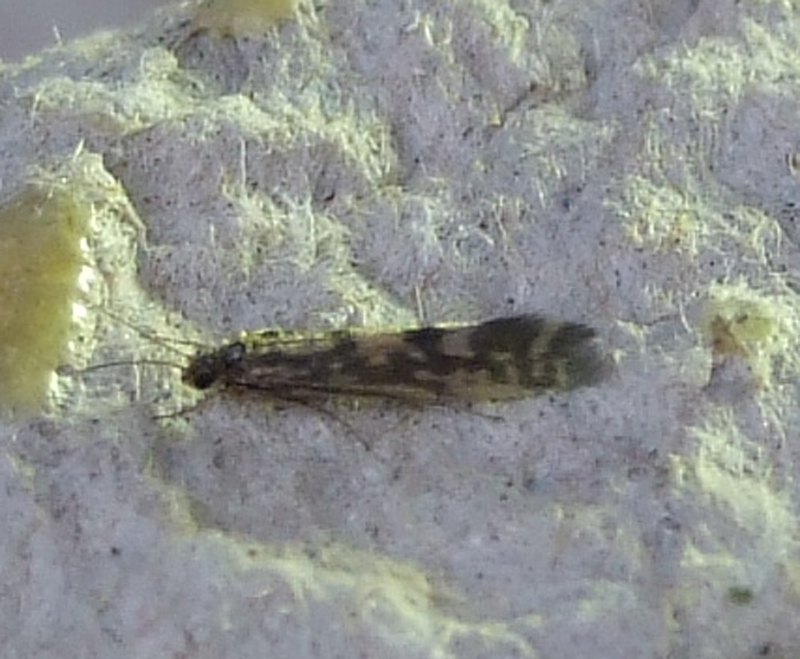

Scientific classification
- Domain: Eukaryota
- Kingdom: Animalia
- Phylum: Arthropoda
- Class: Insecta
- Order: Trichoptera
- Family: Hydroptilidae
- Genus: Agraylea
- Species: A. multipunctata

Binomial name
- Agraylea multipunctata Curtis, 1834

Synonyms
- Agraylea fraterna Banks, 1907

= Agraylea multipunctata =

Species of caddisfly

Agraylea multipunctata, the salt and pepper microcaddis, is a species of microcaddisfly in the family Hydroptilidae. It is found in Europe and Northern Asia (excluding China).
