= Tricholeiochiton fagesii =

Scientific classification
- Kingdom: Animalia
- Phylum: Arthropoda
- Clade: Pancrustacea
- Class: Insecta
- Order: Trichoptera
- Family: Hydroptilidae
- Genus: Tricholeiochiton
- Species: T. fagesii

Binomial name
- Tricholeiochiton fagesii (Guinard, 1879)

Species of caddisfly

Tricholeiochiton fagesii is a species of caddisfly belonging to the family Hydroptilidae.

It is native to Europe.
