= Ochrotrichia apalachicola =

Scientific classification
- Kingdom: Animalia
- Phylum: Arthropoda
- Class: Insecta
- Order: Trichoptera
- Family: Hydroptilidae
- Genus: Ochrotrichia
- Species: O. apalachicola

Binomial name
- Ochrotrichia apalachicola Harris, Pescador & Rasmussen, 1998

Species of caddisfly

Ochrotrichia apalachicola is a species of microcaddisfly. It is only known from a single adult male collected from a cold spring-fed stream in the Apalachicola National Forest, Florida. This is a tiny brown caddisfly up to 3.4 mm in length and can only be distinguished from its closest relatives by minute differences in the genitalia.
