= Scelotrichia kakatu =

Scientific classification
- Kingdom: Animalia
- Phylum: Arthropoda
- Clade: Pancrustacea
- Class: Insecta
- Order: Trichoptera
- Family: Hydroptilidae
- Genus: Scelotrichia
- Species: S. kakatu

Binomial name
- Scelotrichia kakatu Wells, 1990

Species of caddisfly

Scelotrichia kakatu is a caddisfly from the family Hydroptilidae. This species can be found in the Australasian realm.
