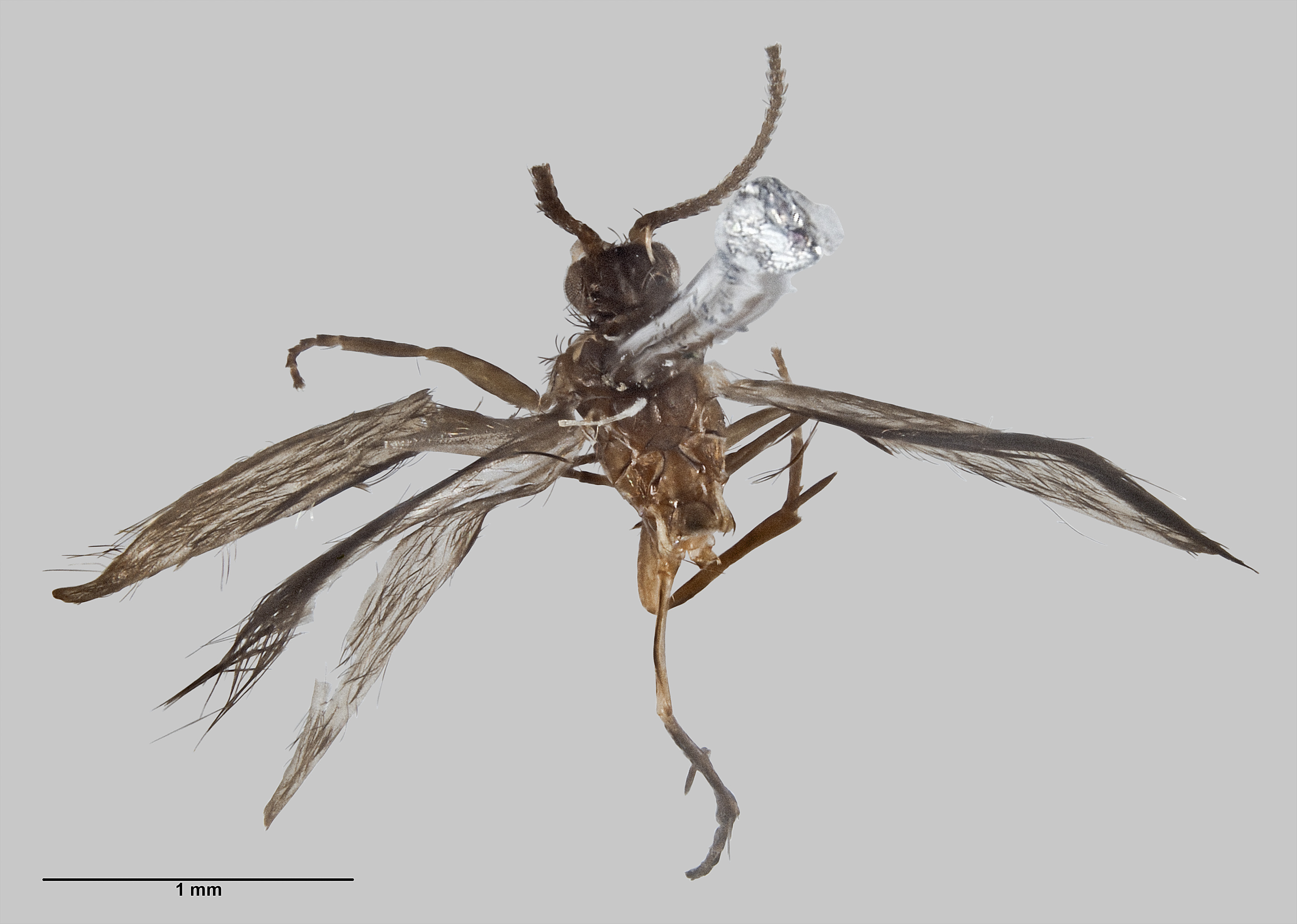
- Male holotype specimen from the collections of the Auckland War Memorial Museum

Scientific classification
- Kingdom: Animalia
- Phylum: Arthropoda
- Clade: Pancrustacea
- Class: Insecta
- Order: Trichoptera
- Family: Hydroptilidae
- Genus: Oxyethira
- Species: O. waipoua

Binomial name
- Oxyethira waipoua Wise, 1998

= Oxyethira waipoua =

Species of caddisfly

Oxyethira waipoua is a species of caddisfly belonging to the family Hydroptilidae. The species was first described by Keith Arthur John Wise in 1998, and is endemic to New Zealand.

== Taxonomy ==
The species was identified by Wise in 1998, based on a specimens collected by Wise in 1996 from a section of the Waipoua River flowing through the Waipoua Forest of Northland Region, New Zealand. Wise named the species after the forest.

== Description ==
O. waipoua is a small species coloured black, with short antennae. Males of species range from 1.9–2.1 mm (0.075–0.083 in) in length from their head to the tips of their folded wings, with while females measure approximately 2.3 mm (0.091 in). The anterior wings of males range between 1.6–1.8 mm (0.063–0.071 in), and is approximately 1.9 mm (0.075 in) for females.

== Distribution and habitat ==
The species is endemic to New Zealand, found in the vicinity of the Waipoua Forest of the Northland Region, New Zealand.
