= Hydroptila apalachicola =

Scientific classification
- Domain: Eukaryota
- Kingdom: Animalia
- Phylum: Arthropoda
- Class: Insecta
- Order: Trichoptera
- Family: Hydroptilidae
- Genus: Hydroptila
- Species: H. apalachicola

Binomial name
- Hydroptila apalachicola Harris, Pescador & Rasmussen 1998

Species of caddisfly

Hydroptila apalachicola is a species of microcaddisfly. It is only known from three adult males collected from cold spring-fed streams in the Apalachicola National Forest, Florida. This is a tiny brown caddisfly up to 3.2 mm in length and can only be distinguished from its closest relatives by minute differences in the structure of the tenth abdominal tergum.
