= Hydroptila icona =

Scientific classification
- Domain: Eukaryota
- Kingdom: Animalia
- Phylum: Arthropoda
- Class: Insecta
- Order: Trichoptera
- Family: Hydroptilidae
- Genus: Hydroptila
- Species: H. icona

Binomial name
- Hydroptila icona Mosely, 1937

Species of caddisfly

Hydroptila icona is a species of microcaddisfly in the family Hydroptilidae. It is found in Central America.
