= Oxyethira pallida =

Scientific classification
- Kingdom: Animalia
- Phylum: Arthropoda
- Class: Insecta
- Order: Trichoptera
- Family: Hydroptilidae
- Genus: Oxyethira
- Species: O. pallida

Binomial name
- Oxyethira pallida (Banks, 1904)

Synonyms
- Oxyethira cibola Denning, 1948

Species of caddisfly

Oxyethira pallida is a species of microcaddisfly in the family Hydroptilidae. It is found in lakes and slow moving rivers in North America.
