= Hydroptila callia =

Scientific classification
- Kingdom: Animalia
- Phylum: Arthropoda
- Class: Insecta
- Order: Trichoptera
- Family: Hydroptilidae
- Genus: Hydroptila
- Species: H. callia

Binomial name
- Hydroptila callia Denning, 1948

Species of caddisfly

Hydroptila callia is a species of microcaddisfly in the family Hydroptilidae. It is found in North America.

== Notes ==
- Type locality: United States of America
