= Agraylea sexmaculata =

Scientific classification
- Domain: Eukaryota
- Kingdom: Animalia
- Phylum: Arthropoda
- Class: Insecta
- Order: Trichoptera
- Family: Hydroptilidae
- Genus: Agraylea
- Species: A. sexmaculata

Binomial name
- Agraylea sexmaculata Curtis, 1834

Species of caddisfly

Agraylea sexmaculata is a species of insect belonging to the family Hydroptilidae.

It is native to Europe.
