= Hydroptila acuta =

Scientific classification
- Domain: Eukaryota
- Kingdom: Animalia
- Phylum: Arthropoda
- Class: Insecta
- Order: Trichoptera
- Family: Hydroptilidae
- Genus: Hydroptila
- Species: H. acuta

Binomial name
- Hydroptila acuta Mosely, 1930

Species of caddisfly

Hydroptila acuta is a species of Trichoptera in the large genus Hydroptila.
