= Oxyethira zeronia =

Scientific classification
- Kingdom: Animalia
- Phylum: Arthropoda
- Class: Insecta
- Order: Trichoptera
- Family: Hydroptilidae
- Genus: Oxyethira
- Species: O. zeronia

Binomial name
- Oxyethira zeronia Ross, 1941

Synonyms
- Oxyethira walteri Denning, 1947

Species of caddisfly

Oxyethira zeronia is a species of microcaddisfly in the family Hydroptilidae. It is found in North America.
