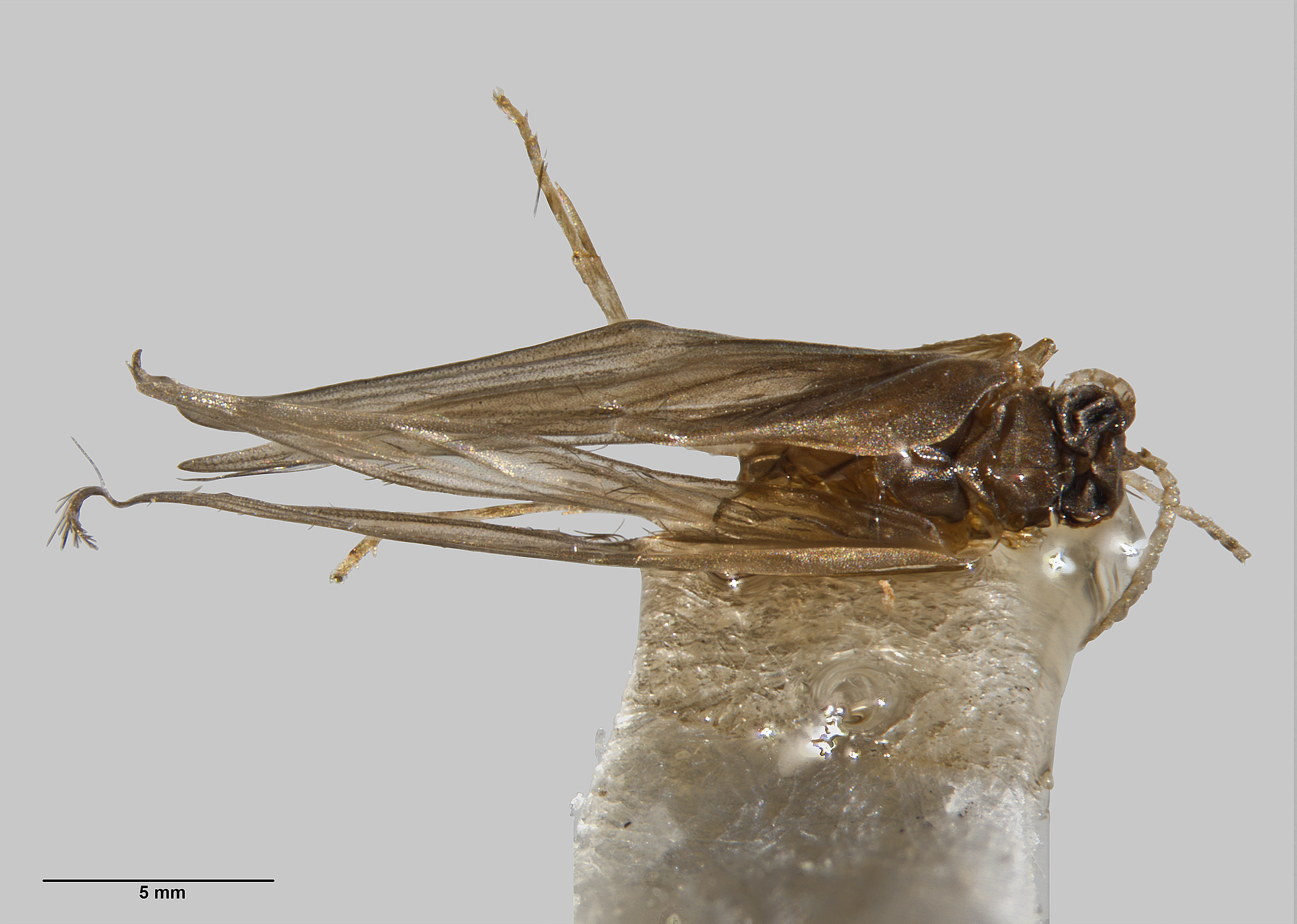
- Male holotype specimen from the collections of the Auckland War Memorial Museum

Scientific classification
- Kingdom: Animalia
- Phylum: Arthropoda
- Clade: Pancrustacea
- Class: Insecta
- Order: Trichoptera
- Family: Hydroptilidae
- Genus: Oxyethira
- Species: O. ahipara

Binomial name
- Oxyethira ahipara Wise, 1998

= Oxyethira ahipara =

Species of caddisfly

Oxyethira ahipara is a species of caddisfly belonging to the family Hydroptilidae. The species was first described by Keith Arthur John Wise in 1998, and is endemic to New Zealand.

== Taxonomy ==
The species was identified by Wise in 1998, based on a specimens collected by Wise in 1983 from the Upper Hunahuna Stream in the Ahipara Plateau of Northland Region, New Zealand. Wise named the species after the Ahipara District.

== Description ==
O. ahipara is a small species coloured dark-brown, with apically attenuated wings with a fringe of long hairs. The species is 2.2–2.4 mm (0.087–0.094 in) in length, with wing stae measuring approximately 2.5 mm (0.098 in). The species can be differentiated from other Oxyethira due to the long coiled spring on the aedeagus, as well as its wing colour pattern.

== Distribution and habitat ==
The species is endemic to New Zealand, found in the vicinity of the Ahipara Plateau of the Northland Region, New Zealand.
