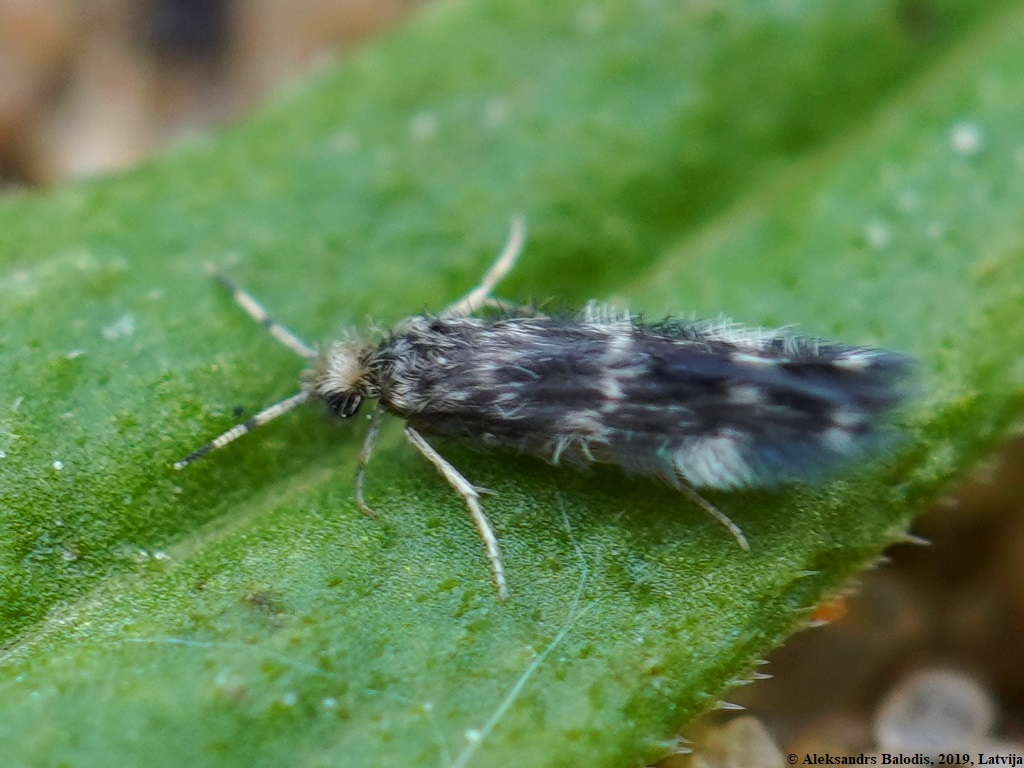
- Hydroptila sparsa

Scientific classification
- Kingdom: Animalia
- Phylum: Arthropoda
- Clade: Pancrustacea
- Class: Insecta
- Order: Trichoptera
- Family: Hydroptilidae
- Subfamily: Hydroptilinae
- Genus: Hydroptila; Dalman 1819

Species
- see text

= Hydroptila =

Genus of caddisflies

Hydroptila is a very large genus of microcaddisflies with a worldwide distribution.

== Species ==
- Hydroptila abantica
- Hydroptila abbotti
- Hydroptila acadia
- Hydroptila acinacis
- Hydroptila acrodonta
- Hydroptila acuminata
- Hydroptila acuta
- Hydroptila acutangulata
- Hydroptila adana
- Hydroptila aegyptia
- Hydroptila africana
- Hydroptila agosensis
- Hydroptila ajax
- Hydroptila alabama
- Hydroptila alara
- Hydroptila albicornis
- Hydroptila aldricki
- Hydroptila amoena
- Hydroptila ampoda
- Hydroptila ancistrion
- Hydroptila andalusiaca
- Hydroptila angulata
- Hydroptila angulifera
- Hydroptila angusta
- Hydroptila angustata
- Hydroptila anisoforficata
- Hydroptila annulicornis
- Hydroptila antennopedia
- Hydroptila antilliarum
- Hydroptila apalachicola
- Hydroptila arctia
- Hydroptila arethusa
- Hydroptila argentinica
- Hydroptila argosa
- Hydroptila armata
- Hydroptila armathai
- Hydroptila artemis
- Hydroptila artesa
- Hydroptila asteria
- Hydroptila astraia
- Hydroptila asymmetrica Kumanski, 1990
- Hydroptila atalante
- Hydroptila atargatis
- Hydroptila ate
- Hydroptila auge
- Hydroptila aurora
- Hydroptila autonoe
- Hydroptila batang
- Hydroptila baukis
- Hydroptila begap
- Hydroptila bellona
- Hydroptila bengkoka
- Hydroptila berkait
- Hydroptila berneri
- Hydroptila biankii
- Hydroptila bibir
- Hydroptila bidens
- Hydroptila bifurcata
- Hydroptila bispina
- Hydroptila bispinatella
- Hydroptila blicklei
- Hydroptila botosaneanui Kumanski, 1990
- Hydroptila brailovskyi
- Hydroptila bribriae
- Hydroptila brigittae
- Hydroptila brincki
- Hydroptila brissaga
- Hydroptila broweri
- Hydroptila bugata
- Hydroptila bumbulensis
- Hydroptila calcara
- Hydroptila callia
- Hydroptila calundoensis
- Hydroptila campanulata
- Hydroptila caperata
- Hydroptila carara
- Hydroptila carolae
- Hydroptila catamarcensis
- Hydroptila chattanooga
- Hydroptila cheaha
- Hydroptila chelops
- Hydroptila chinensis Xue & Yang, 1990
- Hydroptila cintrana
- Hydroptila cochlearis
- Hydroptila cognata
- Hydroptila consimilis
- Hydroptila constricta
- Hydroptila coreana Kumanski, 1990
- Hydroptila cornea
- Hydroptila cornuta
- Hydroptila corsicana
- Hydroptila cortensis
- Hydroptila coscaroni
- Hydroptila cottaquilla
- Hydroptila coweetensis
- Hydroptila crenata
- Hydroptila cretosa
- Hydroptila cruciata
- Hydroptila cubana
- Hydroptila cuneata
- Hydroptila curvata
- Hydroptila dampfi Ulmer, 1929
- Hydroptila daun
- Hydroptila dayung
- Hydroptila decia
- Hydroptila dejaloni
- Hydroptila delineata
- Hydroptila dentata
- Hydroptila denza
- Hydroptila desertorum
- Hydroptila dikirilagoda
- Hydroptila disgalera
- Hydroptila ditalea
- Hydroptila dominicana
- Hydroptila dorsoprocessuata
- Hydroptila eglinensis
- Hydroptila eileithyia
- Hydroptila elongata
- Hydroptila englishi
- Hydroptila engywuck
- Hydroptila eramosa
- Hydroptila erkakanae
- Hydroptila ernstreichli
- Hydroptila extrema
- Hydroptila fiorii
- Hydroptila fiskei
- Hydroptila flinti
- Hydroptila fonsorontina
- Hydroptila forcipata
- Hydroptila fortunata
- Hydroptila fowlesi
- Hydroptila friedeli
- Hydroptila fuentaldeala
- Hydroptila fuentelarbola
- Hydroptila furcata
- Hydroptila furcilla
- Hydroptila furcula
- Hydroptila furtiva
- Hydroptila fuscina
- Hydroptila gandhara
- Hydroptila gapdoi
- Hydroptila gaya
- Hydroptila giama
- Hydroptila giudicellorum
- Hydroptila grandiosa
- Hydroptila grenadense
- Hydroptila grucheti
- Hydroptila gunda
- Hydroptila gurdi
- Hydroptila halus
- Hydroptila hamata
- Hydroptila hamiltoni
- Hydroptila hamistyla
- Hydroptila harpeodes
- Hydroptila helicina
- Hydroptila helmali
- Hydroptila hochyangha
- Hydroptila hoffmannae
- Hydroptila holzenthali
- Hydroptila homochitta
- Hydroptila howelli
- Hydroptila hubenovi
- Hydroptila hyllos
- Hydroptila icona
- Hydroptila idefix
- Hydroptila incertula
- Hydroptila inornata
- Hydroptila insubrica
- Hydroptila ion
- Hydroptila isabellae
- Hydroptila ivisa
- Hydroptila jackmanni
- Hydroptila jaruma
- Hydroptila jeanae
- Hydroptila judithae
- Hydroptila kairos
- Hydroptila kakidaensis Nazoki & Tanida, 2007
- Hydroptila kalchas
- Hydroptila kalonichtis
- Hydroptila kaschgari
- Hydroptila kebawah
- Hydroptila keres
- Hydroptila kieneri
- Hydroptila kirilawela
- Hydroptila klapperichi
- Hydroptila koropa
- Hydroptila koryaki
- Hydroptila kreusa
- Hydroptila kuehnei
- Hydroptila kurukepitiya
- Hydroptila lacandona
- Hydroptila lagoi
- Hydroptila laloka
- Hydroptila latosa
- Hydroptila lennoxi
- Hydroptila lenora
- Hydroptila libanica
- Hydroptila licina
- Hydroptila lidah
- Hydroptila lingigi
- Hydroptila lloganae
- Hydroptila lonchera
- Hydroptila longifilis
- Hydroptila longissimus
- Hydroptila losida
- Hydroptila lotensis
- Hydroptila luzonensis
- Hydroptila lyaios
- Hydroptila maculata
- Hydroptila manavgatensis
- Hydroptila maoae
- Hydroptila mariatheresae
- Hydroptila maritza
- Hydroptila martini
- Hydroptila martorelli
- Hydroptila matsuii
- Hydroptila maza
- Hydroptila mazumbaiensis
- Hydroptila medinai
- Hydroptila melia
- Hydroptila mendli
- Hydroptila meralda
- Hydroptila metoeca
- Hydroptila metteei
- Hydroptila mexicana
- Hydroptila micropotamis
- Hydroptila misolha
- Hydroptila mitirigalla
- Hydroptila modica
- Hydroptila molsonai
- Hydroptila morogorensis
- Hydroptila morpheus
- Hydroptila moselyi
- Hydroptila mugla
- Hydroptila nanseiensis Ito, 2011
- Hydroptila narifer
- Hydroptila neoleonensis
- Hydroptila ngaythibaya
- Hydroptila nicoli
- Hydroptila nigrovalvata
- Hydroptila novicola
- Hydroptila nusagandia
- Hydroptila oakmulgeensis
- Hydroptila obscura
- Hydroptila occulta
- Hydroptila oemerueneli
- Hydroptila ogasawaraensis Ito, 2011
- Hydroptila oguranis Kobayashi, 1974
- Hydroptila okaloosa
- Hydroptila oknos
- Hydroptila oneili
- Hydroptila ornithocephala
- Hydroptila ortaca
- Hydroptila osa
- Hydroptila ouachita
- Hydroptila ovacikensis
- Hydroptila palestinae
- Hydroptila panchaoi
- Hydroptila parachelops
- Hydroptila paradenza
- Hydroptila parakampsis
- Hydroptila paralatosa
- Hydroptila paramoena
- Hydroptila parapiculata
- Hydroptila parastrepha
- Hydroptila paschia
- Hydroptila patriciae
- Hydroptila pecos
- Hydroptila pectinifera
- Hydroptila pedemontana
- Hydroptila perdita
- Hydroptila perimele
- Hydroptila perplexa
- Hydroptila phaon
- Hydroptila phenianica Botosaneanu, 1970
- Hydroptila phileos
- Hydroptila phoeniciae
- Hydroptila pintal
- Hydroptila poirrieri
- Hydroptila potosina
- Hydroptila producta
- Hydroptila protera
- Hydroptila pulchricornis
- Hydroptila pulestoni
- Hydroptila pullata
- Hydroptila quadrifida
- Hydroptila quinaria
- Hydroptila quinola
- Hydroptila rastrilla
- Hydroptila recurvata
- Hydroptila reducta
- Hydroptila remita
- Hydroptila rheni
- Hydroptila rhodica
- Hydroptila roberta
- Hydroptila robusta
- Hydroptila rono
- Hydroptila ruffoi
- Hydroptila rumpun
- Hydroptila sabit
- Hydroptila salmo
- Hydroptila sandersoni
- Hydroptila sanghala
- Hydroptila sarahai
- Hydroptila sauca
- Hydroptila scamandra
- Hydroptila scheiringi
- Hydroptila scolops
- Hydroptila sederhana
- Hydroptila segitiga
- Hydroptila selvatica
- Hydroptila sengavi
- Hydroptila serrata
- Hydroptila setigera
- Hydroptila sicilicula
- Hydroptila sidong
- Hydroptila sikanda
- Hydroptila simplex
- Hydroptila simulans
- Hydroptila singri
- Hydroptila sinuosa
- Hydroptila spada
- Hydroptila spangleri
- Hydroptila sparsa
- Hydroptila spatulata
- Hydroptila spinata
- Hydroptila spinosa Arefina & Armitage, 2003
- Hydroptila spirula
- Hydroptila spirulatella
- Hydroptila starmuehlneri
- Hydroptila stellifera
- Hydroptila strepha
- Hydroptila sudip
- Hydroptila sumanmalie
- Hydroptila surinamensis
- Hydroptila sykorai
- Hydroptila sylvestris
- Hydroptila tacheti
- Hydroptila tagus
- Hydroptila takamaka
- Hydroptila talladega
- Hydroptila tanduka
- Hydroptila tannerorum
- Hydroptila tasmanica
- Hydroptila taurica
- Hydroptila terbela
- Hydroptila thaphena
- Hydroptila thiba
- Hydroptila thisa
- Hydroptila thuna Olah, 1989
- Hydroptila tiani
- Hydroptila tigurina
- Hydroptila tineoides
- Hydroptila tobaga
- Hydroptila tomah
- Hydroptila tombolhitam
- Hydroptila tong
- Hydroptila tortosa
- Hydroptila touroumaya
- Hydroptila traunica
- Hydroptila triangula
- Hydroptila tridentata
- Hydroptila triloba
- Hydroptila trilobata
- Hydroptila trullata
- Hydroptila tumpul
- Hydroptila tusculum
- Hydroptila uncinata
- Hydroptila unicuspis
- Hydroptila upulmalie
- Hydroptila usambarensis
- Hydroptila usuguronis
- Hydroptila vala
- Hydroptila valesiaca
- Hydroptila valhalla
- Hydroptila varla
- Hydroptila vazquezae
- Hydroptila vectis
- Hydroptila venezuelensis
- Hydroptila veracruzensis
- Hydroptila vichtaspa
- Hydroptila viganoi
- Hydroptila vilaverde
- Hydroptila virgata
- Hydroptila vittata
- Hydroptila voticia
- Hydroptila wakulla
- Hydroptila warisa
- Hydroptila waskesia
- Hydroptila waubesiana
- Hydroptila wetumpka
- Hydroptila wyomia
- Hydroptila xella
- Hydroptila xera
- Hydroptila xoncla
- Hydroptila zairiensis
- Hydroptila ziddensis
