= Agraylea pallicornis =

Scientific classification
- Domain: Eukaryota
- Kingdom: Animalia
- Phylum: Arthropoda
- Class: Insecta
- Order: Trichoptera
- Family: Hydroptilidae
- Genus: Agraylea
- Species: A. pallicornis

Binomial name
- Agraylea pallicornis (Eaton, 1873)

Species of caddisfly

Agraylea pallicornis is a species of caddisfly belonging to the family Hydroptilidae.

It is native to Europe.

Synonym:

- Allotrichia pallicornis Eaton, 1873
