= Autotrichia solanikovi =

Scientific classification
- Kingdom: Animalia
- Phylum: Arthropoda
- Clade: Pancrustacea
- Class: Insecta
- Order: Lepidoptera
- Family: Geometridae
- Genus: Autotrichia
- Species: A. solanikovi

Binomial name
- Autotrichia solanikovi Ivinskis & Saldaitis, 2001

Synonyms
- Dodiopsis solanikovi Ivinskis & Saldaitis, 2001

Species of moth

Dodiopsis solanikovi is a moth in the family Geometridae first described by Povilas Ivinskis and Aidas Saldaitis in 2001. It can be found near the Uryngym-gol River in Mongolia.
