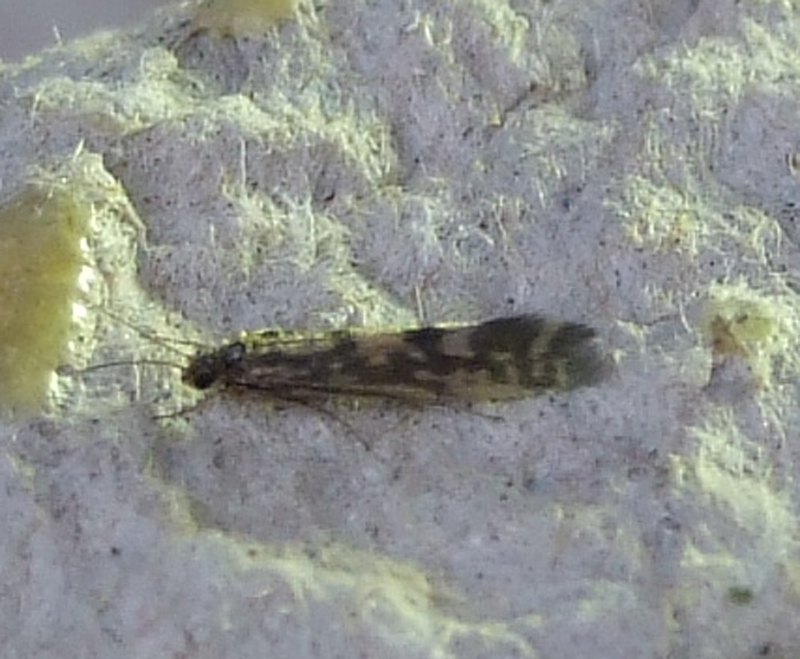
- Agraylea multipunctata

Scientific classification
- Kingdom: Animalia
- Phylum: Arthropoda
- Class: Insecta
- Order: Trichoptera
- Family: Hydroptilidae
- Subfamily: Hydroptilinae
- Genus: Agraylea; Curtis, 1834

Subgenera
- Agraylea (Agraylea) Curtis, 1834; Agraylea (Allotrichia) McLachlan, 1880

= Agraylea =

Genus of caddisflies

Agraylea is a genus of microcaddisflies in the family Hydroptilidae. There are more than 20 described species in Agraylea.

== Species ==
These 25 species belong to the genus Agraylea:

- Agraylea argyricola (Kolenati, 1848)
- Agraylea cognatella McLachlan, 1880
- Agraylea costella Ross, 1941
- Agraylea dactylina
- Agraylea drosima Navas, 1917
- Agraylea galaica Gonzalez & Malicky, 1980
- Agraylea heterocera Navás, 1917
- Agraylea insularis (Hagen, 1865)
- Agraylea laerma Malicky, 1976
- Agraylea marinkovicae Malicky, 1977
- Agraylea militsa Malicky, 1992
- Agraylea multipunctata Curtis, 1834 (salt and pepper microcaddis)
- Agraylea pallicornis (Eaton, 1873)
- Agraylea saltesea Ross, 1938
- Agraylea sexmaculata Curtis, 1834
- Agraylea tauri Jacquemart, 1965
- Agraylea teldanica Botosaneanu, 1974
- Agraylea vilnensis Raciecka, 1937
- † Agraylea cretaria Botosaneanu, 1995
- † Agraylea cumsacculo Wichard, 2013
- † Agraylea electroscientia Melnitsky & Ivanov, 2010
- † Agraylea glaesaria Wichard, 2013
- † Agraylea lentiginosa Botosaneanu & al., 1998
- † Agraylea parva Wichard & Bölling, 2000
- † Agraylea spathifera Ulmer, 1912
