= Scelotrichia =

Scientific classification
- Kingdom: Animalia
- Phylum: Arthropoda
- Clade: Pancrustacea
- Class: Insecta
- Order: Trichoptera
- Family: Hydroptilidae
- Genus: Scelotrichia; Ulmer, 1951

Genus of caddisflies

Scelotrichia is a genus of insects belonging to the family Hydroptilidae.

Species:

- Scelotrichia asgiriskanda (Schmid, 1958)
- Scelotrichia bercabanghalus Wells & Malicky, 1997
- Scelotrichia kakatu Wells, 1990
