= Ochrotrichia =

Scientific classification
- Kingdom: Animalia
- Phylum: Arthropoda
- Clade: Pancrustacea
- Class: Insecta
- Order: Trichoptera
- Family: Hydroptilidae
- Subfamily: Ochrotrichiinae
- Genus: Ochrotrichia; Mosely 1934

Species
- see text

Genus of caddisflies

Ochrotrichia is a large genus of microcaddisflies. All are Nearctic or Neotropical in distribution apart from Ochrotrichia verbekei, recorded from the Democratic Republic of the Congo.

== Species ==
- Ochrotrichia affinis
- Ochrotrichia alargada
- Ochrotrichia aldama
- Ochrotrichia alexanderi
- Ochrotrichia alsea
- Ochrotrichia anisca
- Ochrotrichia anomala
- Ochrotrichia amorfa
- Ochrotrichia apalachicola
- Ochrotrichia argentea
- Ochrotrichia arizonica
- Ochrotrichia arranca
- Ochrotrichia arriba
- Ochrotrichia arva
- Ochrotrichia assita
- Ochrotrichia attenuata
- Ochrotrichia avis
- Ochrotrichia ayaya
- Ochrotrichia bicaudata
- Ochrotrichia bipartita
- Ochrotrichia blanca
- Ochrotrichia boquillas
- Ochrotrichia bractea
- Ochrotrichia brayi
- Ochrotrichia brodzinskyi
- Ochrotrichia buccata
- Ochrotrichia burdicki
- Ochrotrichia cachonera
- Ochrotrichia caimita
- Ochrotrichia calcarata
- Ochrotrichia caligula
- Ochrotrichia campanilla
- Ochrotrichia capitana
- Ochrotrichia caramba
- Ochrotrichia catarina
- Ochrotrichia cavitectum
- Ochrotrichia chaulioda
- Ochrotrichia chiapa
- Ochrotrichia cieneguilla
- Ochrotrichia citra
- Ochrotrichia compacta
- Ochrotrichia concha
- Ochrotrichia confusa
- Ochrotrichia contorta
- Ochrotrichia contrerasi
- Ochrotrichia corneolus
- Ochrotrichia crucecita
- Ochrotrichia cruces
- Ochrotrichia curvata
- Ochrotrichia cuspidata
- Ochrotrichia dactylophora
- Ochrotrichia dardeni
- Ochrotrichia delgada
- Ochrotrichia denaia
- Ochrotrichia denningi
- Ochrotrichia doehleri
- Ochrotrichia dulce
- Ochrotrichia eliaga
- Ochrotrichia elongiralla
- Ochrotrichia ecuatoriana
- Ochrotrichia escoba
- Ochrotrichia eyipantla
- Ochrotrichia felipe
- Ochrotrichia filiforma
- Ochrotrichia flagellata
- Ochrotrichia flexura
- Ochrotrichia flintiana
- Ochrotrichia footei
- Ochrotrichia glabra
- Ochrotrichia graysoni
- Ochrotrichia guadalupensis
- Ochrotrichia gurneyi
- Ochrotrichia hadria
- Ochrotrichia hamatilis
- Ochrotrichia hondurenia
- Ochrotrichia honeyi
- Ochrotrichia ildria
- Ochrotrichia indefinida
- Ochrotrichia ingloria
- Ochrotrichia insularis
- Ochrotrichia intermedia
- Ochrotrichia intortilis
- Ochrotrichia involuta
- Ochrotrichia islenia
- Ochrotrichia ixcateopana
- Ochrotrichia ixtlahuaca
- Ochrotrichia limonensis
- Ochrotrichia lobifera
- Ochrotrichia logana
- Ochrotrichia lometa
- Ochrotrichia longispina
- Ochrotrichia lucia
- Ochrotrichia lupita
- Ochrotrichia machiguenga
- Ochrotrichia manuensis
- Ochrotrichia marica
- Ochrotrichia maya
- Ochrotrichia maycoba
- Ochrotrichia membrana
- Ochrotrichia mono
- Ochrotrichia moselyi
- Ochrotrichia nacora
- Ochrotrichia oblongata
- Ochrotrichia obtecta
- Ochrotrichia okaloosa
- Ochrotrichia okanoganensis
- Ochrotrichia oregona
- Ochrotrichia pacifica
- Ochrotrichia palitla
- Ochrotrichia palmata
- Ochrotrichia panamensis
- Ochrotrichia pectinata
- Ochrotrichia pectinifera
- Ochrotrichia phenosa
- Ochrotrichia poblana
- Ochrotrichia ponta
- Ochrotrichia potomus
- Ochrotrichia provosti
- Ochrotrichia puyana
- Ochrotrichia quadrispina
- Ochrotrichia quebrada
- Ochrotrichia quinealensis
- Ochrotrichia raposa
- Ochrotrichia ramona
- Ochrotrichia regina
- Ochrotrichia regiomontana
- Ochrotrichia riesi
- Ochrotrichia robisoni
- Ochrotrichia rothi
- Ochrotrichia salaris
- Ochrotrichia serra
- Ochrotrichia serrana
- Ochrotrichia shawnee
- Ochrotrichia silva
- Ochrotrichia spina
- Ochrotrichia spinosa
- Ochrotrichia spinosissima
- Ochrotrichia spinula
- Ochrotrichia spinulata
- Ochrotrichia stylata
- Ochrotrichia susanae
- Ochrotrichia tagala
- Ochrotrichia tarsalis
- Ochrotrichia tenanga
- Ochrotrichia tenuata
- Ochrotrichia transylvanica
- Ochrotrichia trapoiza
- Ochrotrichia trinitatis
- Ochrotrichia tuscaloosa
- Ochrotrichia unica
- Ochrotrichia unicornia
- Ochrotrichia unio
- Ochrotrichia velascoi
- Ochrotrichia verbekei
- Ochrotrichia verda
- Ochrotrichia vertreesi
- Ochrotrichia vieja
- Ochrotrichia villarenia
- Ochrotrichia weddleae
- Ochrotrichia weoka
- Ochrotrichia wojcickyi
- Ochrotrichia xena
- Ochrotrichia yanayacuana
- Ochrotrichia yavesia
- Ochrotrichia yepachica
- Ochrotrichia zihuaquia
- Ochrotrichia zioni
