= Tricholeiochiton =

Scientific classification
- Kingdom: Animalia
- Phylum: Arthropoda
- Clade: Pancrustacea
- Class: Insecta
- Order: Trichoptera
- Family: Hydroptilidae
- Genus: Tricholeiochiton; Kloet & Hincks, 1944

Genus of caddisflies

Tricholeiochiton is a genus of insects belonging to the family Hydroptilidae.

The species of this genus are found in Europe, Southern Africa and Australia.

Species:

- Tricholeiochiton fagesii (Guinard, 1879)
- Tricholeiochiton fortensis (Ulmer, 1951)
