= Ithytrichia =

Scientific classification
- Kingdom: Animalia
- Phylum: Arthropoda
- Clade: Pancrustacea
- Class: Insecta
- Order: Trichoptera
- Family: Hydroptilidae
- Genus: Ithytrichia; Eaton, 1873

Genus of caddisflies

Ithytrichia is a genus of insects belonging to the family Hydroptilidae.

The species of this genus are found in Europe and America.

Species:

- Ithytrichia aquila Gonzalez & Malicky, 1988
- Ithytrichia bosniaca Murgoci, Botnariuec & Botosaneanu, 1948
