= Dibusa =

Scientific classification
- Domain: Eukaryota
- Kingdom: Animalia
- Phylum: Arthropoda
- Class: Insecta
- Order: Trichoptera
- Family: Hydroptilidae
- Genus: Dibusa; Ross, 1939
- Species: D. angata

Binomial name
- Dibusa angata Ross, 1939

Genus of caddisflies

Dibusa is a genus of microcaddisflies in the family Hydroptilidae. There is one described species in Dibusa, D. angata.
