= Stactobia =

Scientific classification
- Kingdom: Animalia
- Phylum: Arthropoda
- Clade: Pancrustacea
- Class: Insecta
- Order: Trichoptera
- Family: Hydroptilidae
- Genus: Stactobia; McLachlan, 1880

Genus of caddisflies

Stactobia is a genus of insects belonging to the family Hydroptilidae.

The species of this genus are found in Eurasia.

Species:

- Stactobia algira Vaillant, 1951
- Stactobia alpina Bertuetti, Lodovici & Valle, 2004
