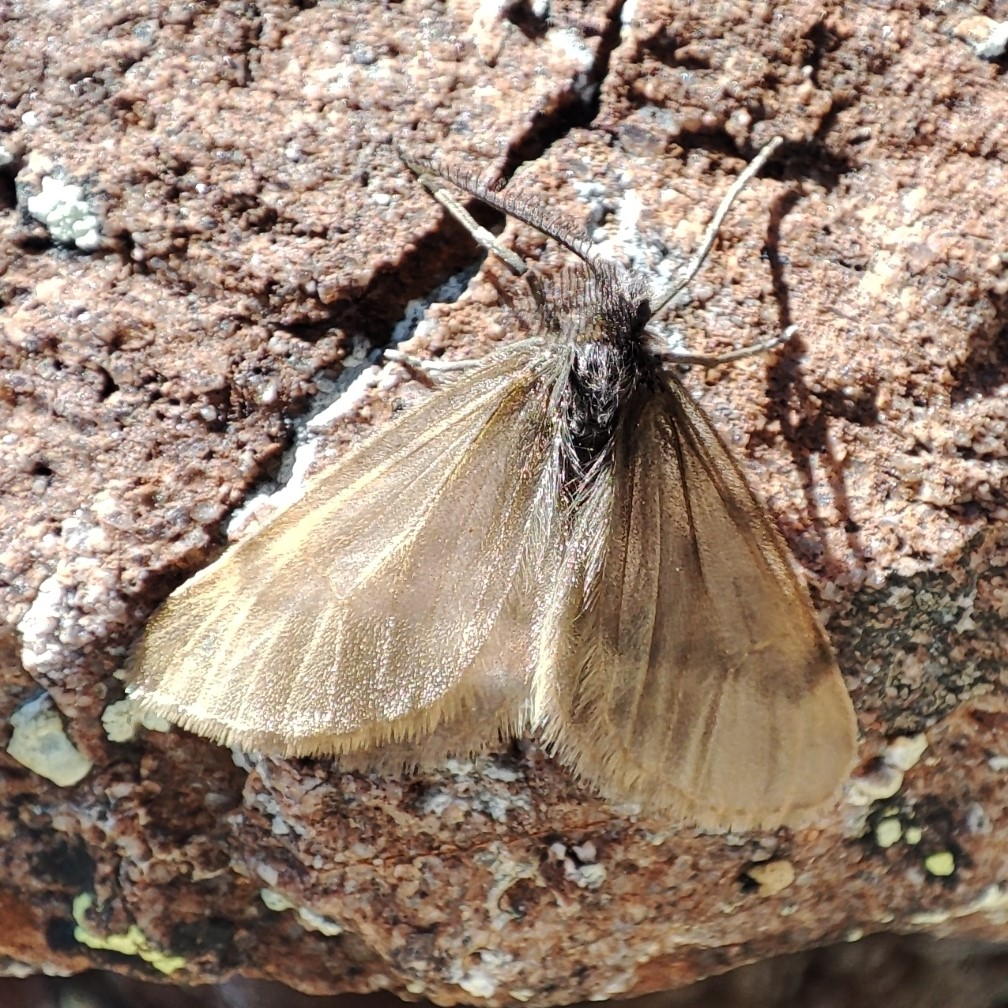
- Autotrichia heterogynoides

Scientific classification
- Kingdom: Animalia
- Phylum: Arthropoda
- Clade: Pancrustacea
- Class: Insecta
- Order: Lepidoptera
- Family: Geometridae
- Tribe: Gnophini
- Genus: Autotrichia; Prout, 1934

Synonyms
- Orthotrichia Wehrli, 1927; Dodiopsis Ivinskis & Saldaitis, 2001

= Autotrichia =

Genus of moths

Autotrichia is a genus of moths in the family Geometridae that was erected by Prout in 1934.

== Species ==
- Autotrichia heterogynoides (Wehrli, 1927)
- Autotrichia lysimeles (Prout, 1924)
- Autotrichia pellucida (Staudinger, 1899)
- Autotrichia solanikovi (Ivinskis & Saldaitis, 2001)
