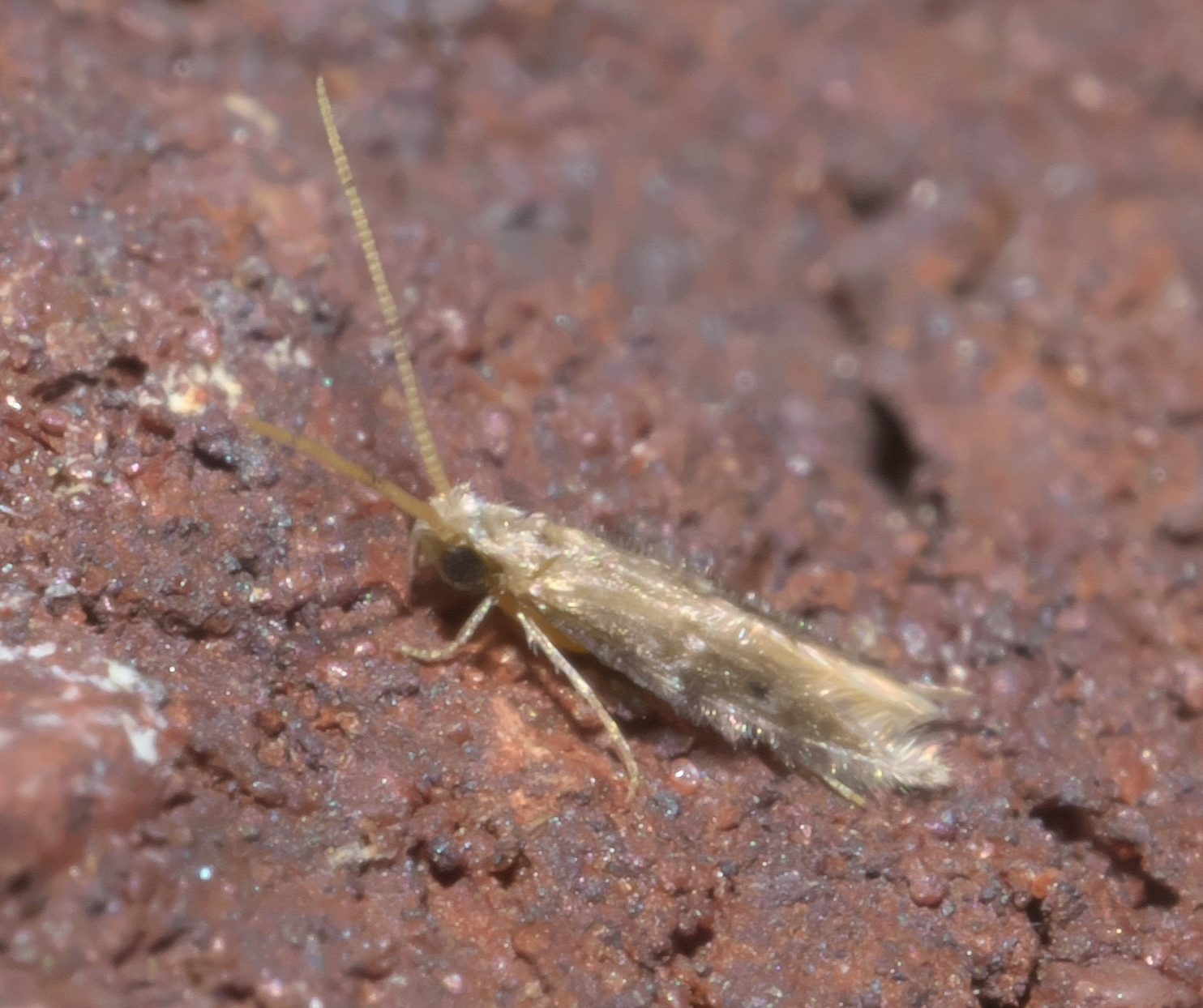

Scientific classification
- Kingdom: Animalia
- Phylum: Arthropoda
- Class: Insecta
- Order: Trichoptera
- Family: Hydroptilidae
- Subfamily: Hydroptilinae
- Genus: Oxyethira; Eaton, 1873

Subgenera
- Oxyethira (Argyrobothrus) Barnard, 1934; Oxyethira (Dactylotrichia) Kelley, 1984; Oxyethira (Dampfitrichia) Mosely, 1937; Oxyethira (Holarctotrichia) Kelley, 1984; Oxyethira (Loxotrichia) Mosely, 1937; Oxyethira (Mesotrichia) Kelley, 1984; Oxyethira (Oxyethira) Eaton, 1873; Oxyethira (Oxytrichia) Mosely, 1939; Oxyethira (Pacificotrichia) Kelley, 1989; Oxyethira (Tanytrichia) Kelley, 1984; Oxyethira (Trichoglene) Neboiss, 1977

Diversity
- at least 210 species

= Oxyethira =

Genus of caddisflies

Oxyethira is a genus of microcaddisflies in the family Hydroptilidae. There are more than 210 described species in Oxyethira.

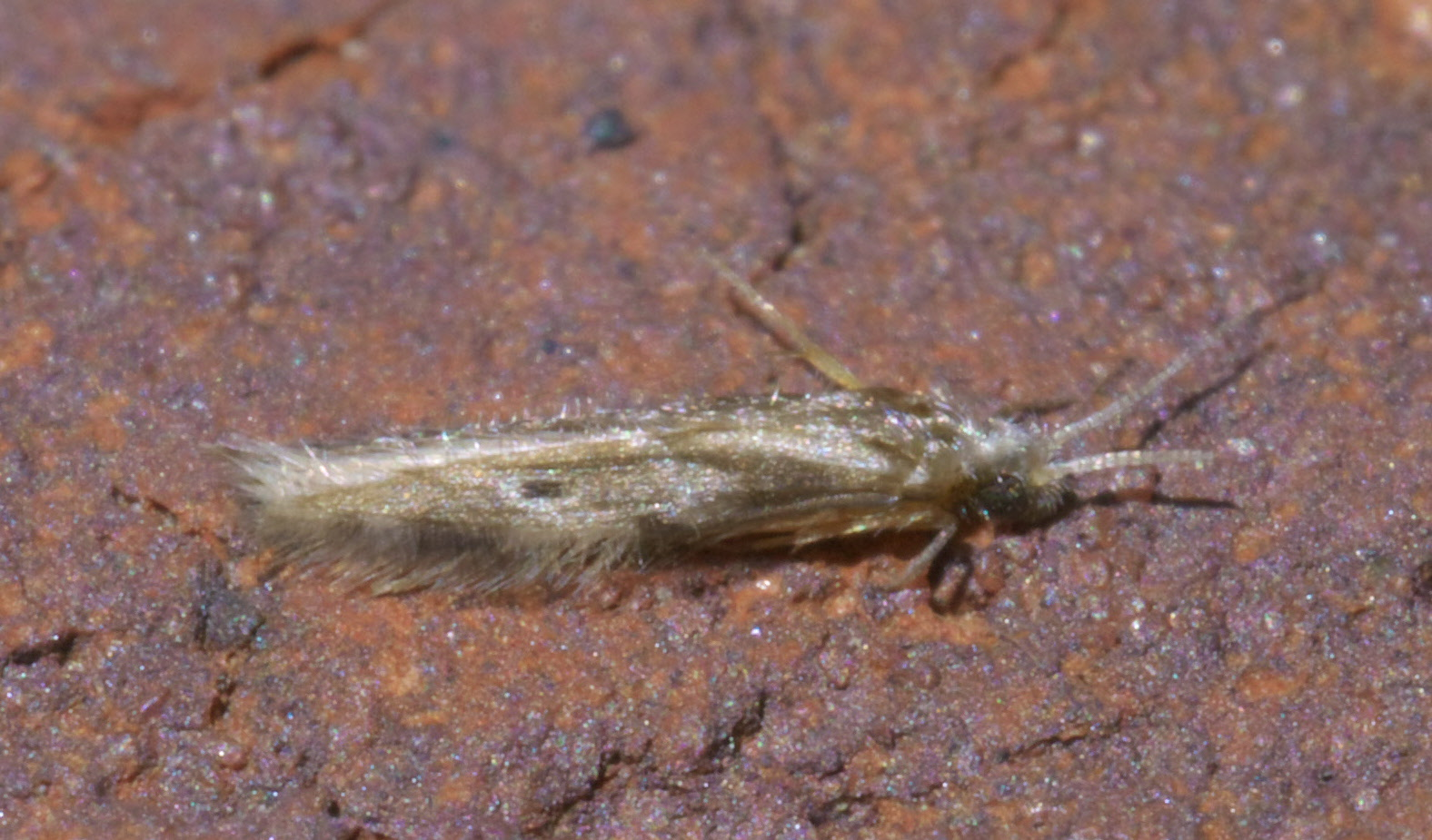

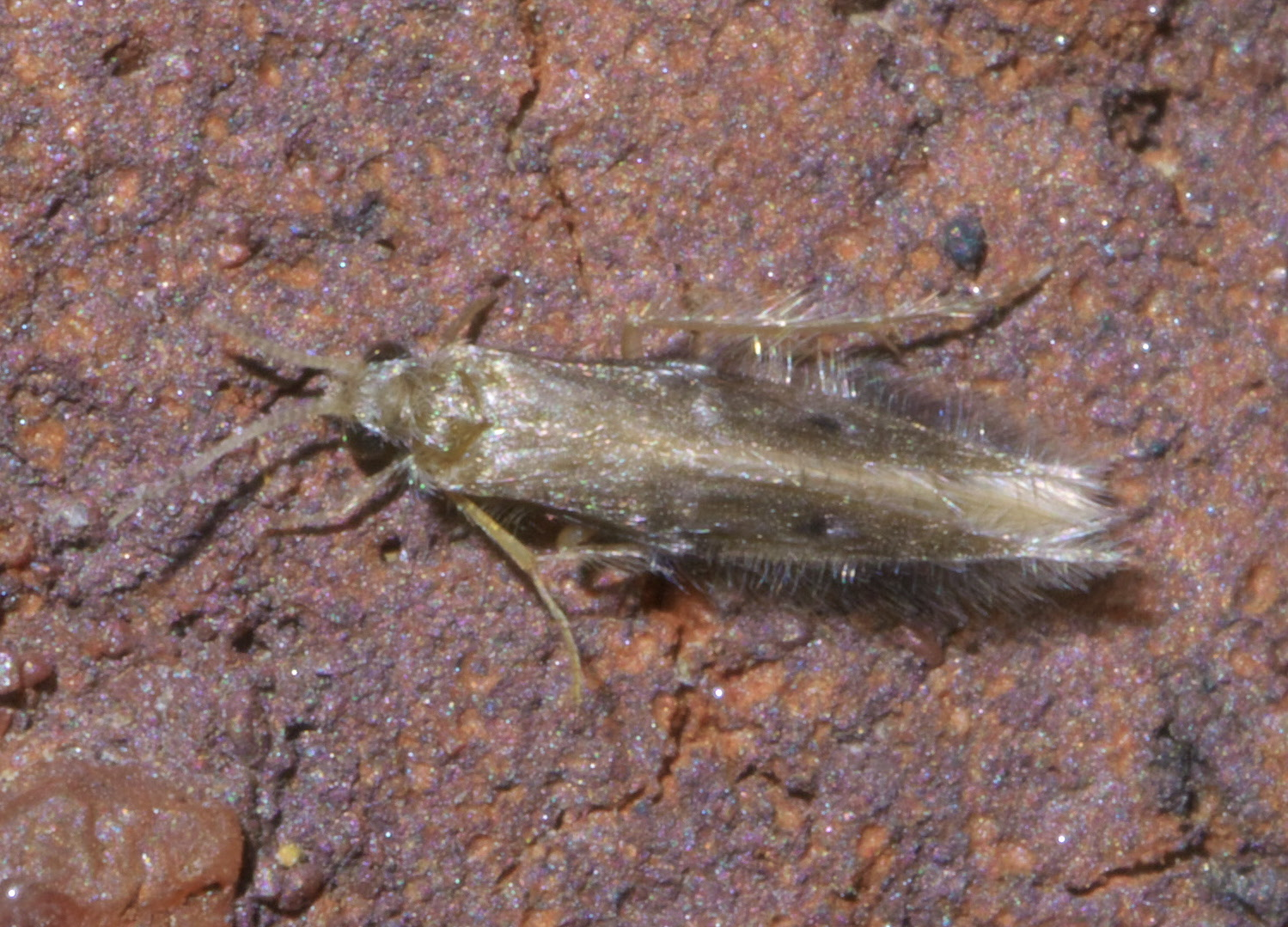

== See also ==
- List of Oxyethira species
