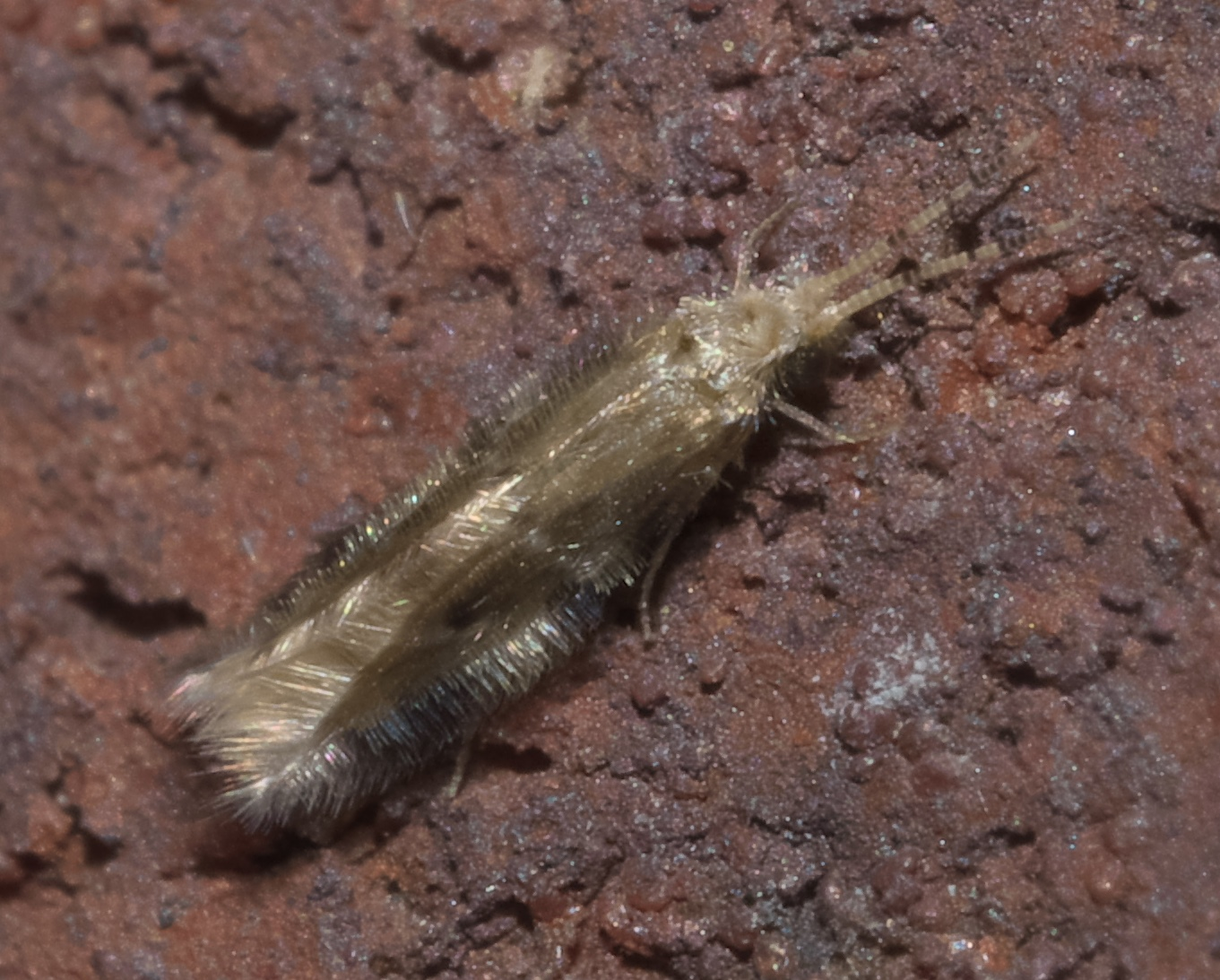
- Microcaddisfly from Pryor Creek, Oklahoma

Scientific classification
- Kingdom: Animalia
- Phylum: Arthropoda
- Clade: Pancrustacea
- Class: Insecta
- Order: Trichoptera
- Suborder: Spicipalpia (?)
- Superfamily: Hydroptiloidea
- Family: Hydroptilidae; Stephens, 1836

Subfamilies
- Hydroptilinae Stephens, 1836; Leucotrichiinae Flint, 1970; Neotrichiinae Ross, 1956; Ochrotrichiinae Marshall, 1979; Orthotrichiinae Nielsen, 1948; Stactobiinae Botosaneanu, 1956

= Hydroptilidae =

Family of caddisflies

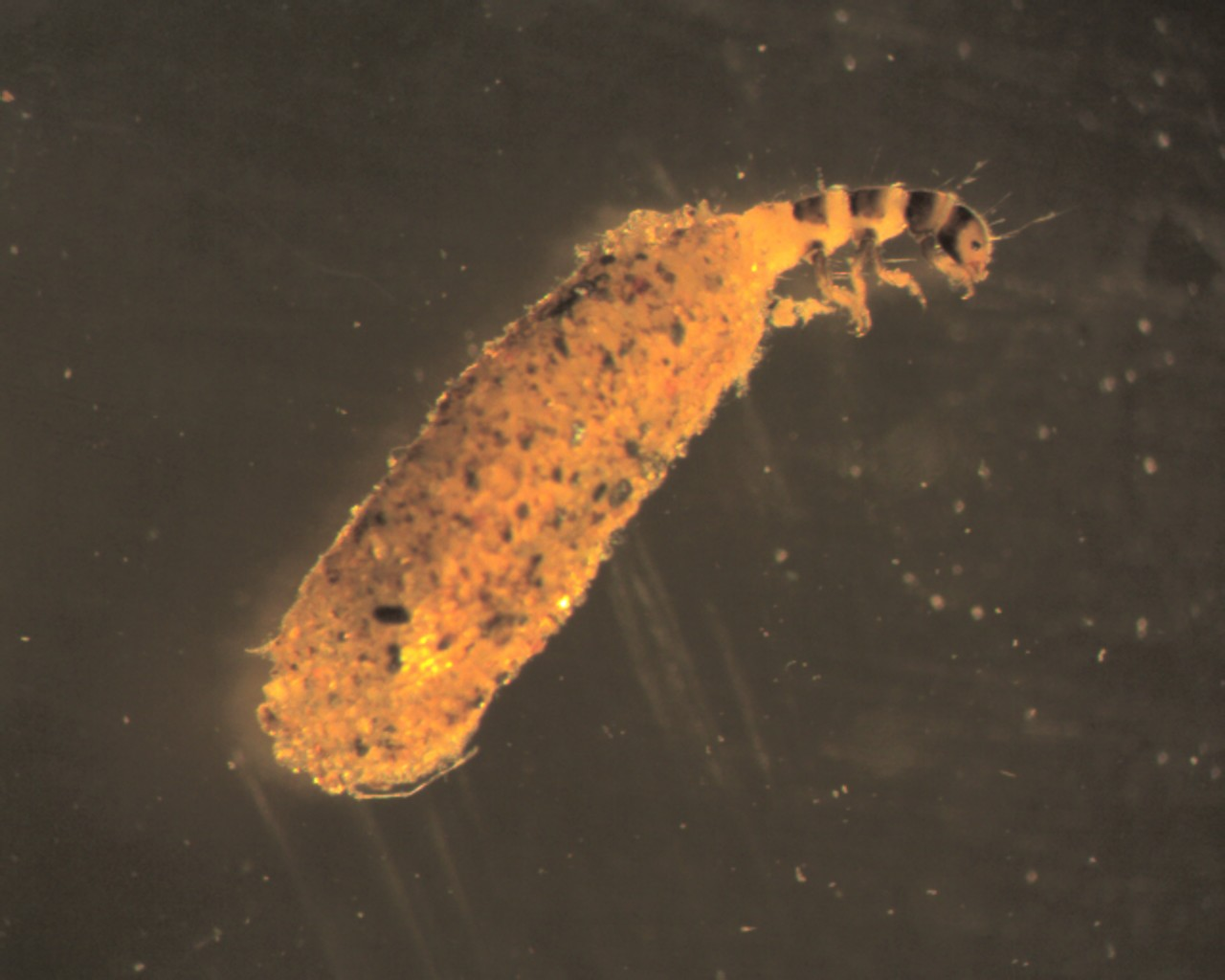
Hydroptila larva

The Hydroptilidae are a large family of caddisflies (Trichoptera) with a worldwide distribution. They are commonly known as microcaddisflies or purse-case caddisflies, in reference to two characteristic traits of this family: Hydroptilidae are much smaller than other caddisflies, rarely exceeding 5 mm (0.20 in) in length. Their larvae do not build a protective case until the final instar of their growth. At that time however, they build a typically Purse-shaped case, either portable or stuck to the substrate, in which the larva finishes growth and pupates.

== Systematics and taxonomy ==
Their systematic placement among the caddisflies is still disputed. They are traditionally placed in the suborder Spicipalpia, which do not seem to be a natural monophyletic group, but rather an evolutionary grade of moderately advanced caddisflies. Some authors downrank the Spicipalpia to a superfamily of the more basal Annulipalpia and call them Rhyacophiloidea (which otherwise refers to a subfamily of suborder Spicipalpia), but recent studies generally rejected this view.

More often, the Hydroptilidae are placed in a monotypic superfamily Hydroptiloidea, either in the Spicipalpia or – probably more appropriately considering the present state of caddisfly phylogeny – incertae sedis in the Trichoptera. It may be that the Glossosomatoidea are particularly closely related to the Hydroptilidae; together they might even be closer to the most advanced caddisflies (the tube case caddisflies, Integripalpia) than any other living caddisfly. But this view is almost as disputed as including the Spicipalpia in the Annulipalpia. In any case, were Glossosomatoidea and Hydroptiloidea to be merged into a single superfamily, the older name Hydroptiloidea would apply for the combined group.

The peculiarly apomorphic genera Palaeagapetus and Ptilocolepus have been separated as subfamily Ptilocolepinae, while all other genera form the Hydroptilinae family with its multiple tribes. It is far from certain that the Ptilocolepinae are the living fossils such an arrangement would imply them to be.

== Genera ==
Around 70 genera with at least 1,700 species have been described from this family:

Hydroptilinae Stephens, 1836

- Acanthotrichia Wells, 1982
- Acritoptila Wells, 1982
- Agraylea Curtis, 1834
- Allotrichia McLachlan, 1880
- Austratrichia Wells, 1982
- Cyclopsiella Kjaerandsen, 1997
- Dhatrichia Mosely, 1948
- Hellyethira Neboiss, 1977
- Hydroptila Dalman, 1819
- Hydroptilina Martynov, 1934
- Jabitrichia Wells, 1990
- Microptila Ris, 1897
- Missitrichia Wells, 1991
- Mulgravia Wells, 1982
- Oxyethira Eaton, 1873
- Paroxyethira Mosely, 1924
- Paucicalcaria Mathis & Bowles, 1989
- Tangatrichia Wells & Andersen, 1995
- Tricholeiochiton Kloet & Hincks, 1944
- Ugandatrichia Mosely, 1939
- Vietrichia Olah, 1989
- Wlitrichia Kjaerandsen, 1997
- Xuthotrichia Mosely, 1934

Leucotrichiinae Flint, 1970

- Abtrichia Mosely, 1939
- Acostatrichia Mosely, 1939
- Alisotrichia Flint, 1964
- Anchitrichia Flint, 1970
- Ascotrichia Flint, 1983
- Betrichia Mosely, 1939
- Celaenotrichia Mosely, 1934
- Cerasmatrichia Flint, Harris & Botosaneanu, 1994
- Ceratotrichia Flint, 1992
- Costatrichia Mosely, 1937
- Eutonella Mueller, 1921
- Leucotrichia Mosely, 1934
- Mejicanotrichia Harris & Holzenthal, 1997
- Peltopsyche Mueller, 1879
- Scelobotrichia Harris & Bueno-Soria, 1993
- Zumatrichia Mosely, 1937

Neotrichiinae Ross, 1956

- Kumanskiella Harris & Flint, 1992
- Mayatrichia Mosely, 1937
- Neotrichia Morton, 1905
- Taraxitrichia Flint & Harris, 1991

Ochrotrichiinae Marshall, 1979

- Angrisanoia Özdikmen, 2008
- Caledonotrichia Sykora, 1967
- Maydenoptila Neboiss, 1977
- Metrichia Ross, 1938
- Ochrotrichia Mosely, 1934
- Nothotrichia Flint, 1967
- Ragatrichia Oláh & Johanson, 2011
- Rhyacopsyche Mueller, 1879

Orthotrichiinae Nielsen, 1948

- Ithytrichia Eaton, 1873
- Orthotrichia Eaton, 1873

Stactobiinae Botosaneanu, 1956

- Bredinia Flint, 1968
- Byrsopteryx Flint, 1981
- Catoxyethira Ulmer, 1912
- Chrysotrichia Schmid, 1958
- Flintiella Angrisano, 1995
- Niuginitrichia Wells, 1990
- Orinocotrichia Harris, Flint & Holzenthal, 2002
- Parastactobia Schmid, 1958
- Plethus Hagen, 1887
- Scelotrichia Ulmer, 1951
- Stactobia McLachlan, 1880
- Stactobiella Martynov, 1924
- Tizatetrichia Harris, Flint & Holzenthal, 2002

incertae sedis

- †Burminoptila Botosaneanu, 1981
- Dibusa Ross, 1939
- Dicaminus Mueller, 1879
- †Electrotrichia Ulmer, 1912
- Macrostactobia Schmid, 1958
- †Novajerseya Botosaneanu, Johnson & P. R. Dillon, 1998
- Orphninotrichia Mosely, 1934
