= List of Limnephilus species =

This is a list of 194 species in Limnephilus, a genus of northern caddisflies in the family Limnephilidae.

== Limnephilus species ==
- Limnephilus abbreviatus Banks, 1908^{i c g}
- Limnephilus abstrusus McLachlan, 1872^{i c g}
- Limnephilus acnestus Ross, 1938^{i c g}
- Limnephilus acrophylax Schmid, 1952^{i c g}
- Limnephilus acula Ross & Merkley, 1952^{i c g}
- Limnephilus adapus Ross, 1950^{i c g}
- Limnephilus ademiensis Martynov, 1914^{i c g}
- Limnephilus ademus Ross, 1941^{i c g b}
- Limnephilus affinis Curtis, 1834^{i c g}
- Limnephilus aistleitneri Malicky, 1986^{i c g}
- Limnephilus alagnaki Ruiter, 1995^{i c g}
- Limnephilus alaicus (Martynov, 1915)^{i c g}
- Limnephilus alberta Denning, 1958^{i c g}
- Limnephilus alconura Ross & Merkley, 1952^{i c g}
- Limnephilus algosus (McLachlan, 1868)^{i c g}
- Limnephilus alienus Martynov, 1915^{i c g}
- Limnephilus anadyrensis Martynov, 1936^{i c g}
- Limnephilus apache Flint, 1965^{i c g}
- Limnephilus aretto Ross, 1938^{i c g}
- Limnephilus argenteornatus Hagen, 1873^{i c g}
- Limnephilus argenteus Banks, 1914^{i c g}
- Limnephilus arizona Ross, 1941^{i c g}
- Limnephilus asaphes McLachlan, 1880^{i c g}
- Limnephilus asiaticus (McLachlan, 1874)^{i c g}
- Limnephilus assimilis (Banks, 1908)^{i c g}
- Limnephilus atercus Denning, 1965^{i c g}
- Limnephilus atlanticus Nybom, 1948^{i c g}
- Limnephilus audeus Botosaneanu, 2000^{g}
- Limnephilus auricula Curtis, 1834^{i c g}
- Limnephilus baja Ruiter, 1995^{i c g}
- Limnephilus bifidus Banks, 1908^{i c g}
- Limnephilus binotatus Curtis, 1834^{g}
- Limnephilus biparta Denning in Denning & Sykora, 1966^{i c g}
- Limnephilus bipunctatus Curtis, 1834^{i c g}
- Limnephilus bloomfieldi Ruiter, 1995^{i c g}
- Limnephilus borealis (Zetterstedt, 1840)^{i c g}
- Limnephilus bucketti Denning, 1965^{i c g}
- Limnephilus bulgani Mey, 1991^{i c g}
- Limnephilus canadensis Banks, 1908^{i c g}
- Limnephilus castor Ross & Merkley, 1952^{i c g}
- Limnephilus catula Denning, 1965^{i c g}
- Limnephilus caucasicus Schmid, 1955^{i c g}
- Limnephilus centralis Curtis, 1834^{i c g}
- Limnephilus challisa Denning, 1958^{i c g}
- Limnephilus chereshnevi Nimmo, 1995^{i c g}
- Limnephilus cianficconiae Malicky, 1980^{i c g}
- Limnephilus cinctus Hagen, 1865^{g}
- Limnephilus cockerelli Banks, 1900^{i c g}
- Limnephilus coenosus Curtis, 1834^{i c g}
- Limnephilus coloradensis (Banks, 1899)^{i c g}
- Limnephilus concolor Banks, 1899^{i c g b}
- Limnephilus correptus McLachlan, 1880^{i c g}
- Limnephilus ctenifer Flint, 1967^{i c g}
- Limnephilus decipiens (Kolenati, 1848)^{i c g}
- Limnephilus diphyes McLachlan, 1880^{i c g}
- Limnephilus discolor (Banks, 1901)^{i c g}
- Limnephilus dispar McLachlan, 1875^{i c g}
- Limnephilus distinctus Tian & Yang in Tian, Li, Yang & Sun, in Chen, editor, 1993^{i c g}
- Limnephilus diversus (Banks, 1903)^{i c g}
- Limnephilus doderoi (Navas, 1929)^{i c g}
- Limnephilus ectus Ross, 1941^{i c g}
- Limnephilus elegans Curtis, 1834^{i c g}
- Limnephilus eocenicus Cockerell, 1920^{i c g}
- Limnephilus externus Hagen, 1861^{i c g b}
- Limnephilus extractus Walker, 1852^{i c g}
- Limnephilus extricatus McLachlan, 1865^{i c g}
- Limnephilus fagus Ross, 1941^{i c g b}
- Limnephilus femoralis Kirby in Richardson, 1837^{i c g}
- Limnephilus femoratus (Zetterstedt, 1840)^{i c g}
- Limnephilus fenestratus (Zetterstedt, 1840)^{i c g}
- Limnephilus fischeri Ruiter, 1995^{i c g}
- Limnephilus flavastellus Banks, 1918^{i c g b}
- Limnephilus flavicornis (Fabricius, 1787)^{i c g}
- Limnephilus flavospinosus (Stein, 1874)^{i c g}
- Limnephilus frijole Ross, 1944^{i c g}
- Limnephilus fumigatus (Germar, 1827)^{i c g}
- Limnephilus fumosus (Banks, 1900)^{i c g}
- Limnephilus fuscicornis (Rambur, 1842)^{i c g}
- Limnephilus fuscinervis (Zetterstedt, 1840)^{i c g}
- Limnephilus fuscoradiatus Schmid & Guppy, 1952^{i c g}
- Limnephilus fuscovittatus Matsumura, 1904^{i c g}
- Limnephilus germanus McLachlan, 1875^{i c g}
- Limnephilus graecus Schmid, 1965^{i c g}
- Limnephilus granti Nimmo, 1991^{i c g}
- Limnephilus griseus (Linnaeus, 1758)^{i c g}
- Limnephilus guadarramicus Schmid, 1955^{i c g}
- Limnephilus hageni Banks, 1930^{i c g}
- Limnephilus hamifer Flint, 1963^{i c g}
- Limnephilus harrimani Banks, 1900^{i c g}
- Limnephilus helveticus Schmid, 1965^{i c g}
- Limnephilus hirsutus (Pictet, 1834)^{i c g}
- Limnephilus hovsgolicus Morse, 1999^{i c g}
- Limnephilus hyalinus Hagen, 1861^{i c g}
- Limnephilus hyperboreus Thomson, 1891^{i c g}
- Limnephilus ignavus McLachlan, 1865^{i c g}
- Limnephilus incertus Martynov, 1909^{i c g}
- Limnephilus indivisus Walker, 1852^{i c g b}
- Limnephilus infernalis (Banks, 1914)^{i c g}
- Limnephilus internalis (Banks, 1914)^{i c g}
- Limnephilus iranus (Martynov, 1928)^{i c g}
- Limnephilus italicus McLachlan, 1884^{i c g}
- Limnephilus janus Ross, 1938^{i c g}
- Limnephilus kalama Denning, 1968^{i c g}
- Limnephilus kaumarajiva Schmid, 1961^{i c g}
- Limnephilus kedrovayaensis Nimmo, 1995^{i c g}
- Limnephilus kennicotti Banks, 1920^{i c g}
- Limnephilus labus Ross, 1941^{i c g}
- Limnephilus lakshaman Olah, 1994^{i c g}
- Limnephilus lithus (Milne, 1935)^{i c g}
- Limnephilus lopho Ross, 1949^{i c g}
- Limnephilus lucensis Navas, 1924^{i c g}
- Limnephilus lunatus Curtis, 1834^{i c g}
- Limnephilus luridus Curtis, 1834^{i c g}
- Limnephilus major (Martynov, 1909)^{i c g}
- Limnephilus malickyi Sipahiler, 1992^{i c g}
- Limnephilus marmoratus Curtis, 1834^{i c g}
- Limnephilus martynovi Kumanski, 1994^{i c g}
- Limnephilus maya Flint, 1967^{i c g}
- Limnephilus mexicanus Flint, 1967^{i c g}
- Limnephilus microdentatus Martynov, 1913^{i c g}
- Limnephilus minos Malicky, 1971^{i c g}
- Limnephilus moestus Banks, 1908^{i c g}
- Limnephilus morrisoni Banks, 1920^{i c g b}
- Limnephilus nigriceps (Zetterstedt, 1840)^{i c g}
- Limnephilus nimmoi Roy & Harper, 1975^{i c g}
- Limnephilus nipponicus Schmid, 1964^{i c g}
- Limnephilus nogus Ross, 1944^{i c g b}
- Limnephilus nybomi Malicky, 1984^{i c g}
- Limnephilus obsoletus Rambur, 1842^{i c g}
- Limnephilus occidentalis Banks, 1908^{i c g b}
- Limnephilus orientalis Martynov, 1935^{i c g}
- Limnephilus ornatulus Schmid, 1965^{i c g}
- Limnephilus ornatus Banks, 1897^{i c g b}
- Limnephilus pallens (Banks, 1920)^{i c g}
- Limnephilus pantodapus McLachlan, 1875^{i c g}
- Limnephilus partitus Walker, 1852^{i c g}
- Limnephilus parvulus (Banks, 1905)^{i c g b}
- Limnephilus pati O'Connor, 1980^{i c g}
- Limnephilus peculiaris McLachlan, 1875^{i c g}
- Limnephilus peltus Denning, 1962^{i c g}
- Limnephilus perjurus Hagen, 1861^{i c g}
- Limnephilus perpusillus Walker, 1852^{i c g}
- Limnephilus petri Marinkovic-Gospodnetic, 1966^{i c g}
- Limnephilus picturatus McLachlan, 1875^{i c g}
- Limnephilus plaga Walker, 1852^{i c g}
- Limnephilus politus McLachlan, 1865^{i c g}
- Limnephilus pollux Flint, 1967^{i c g}
- Limnephilus ponticus McLachlan, 1898^{i c g}
- Limnephilus primoryensis Nimmo, 1995^{i c g}
- Limnephilus productus Banks, 1914^{i c g}
- Limnephilus quadratus Martynov, 1914^{i c g}
- Limnephilus rhea Ruiter, 1995^{i c g}
- Limnephilus rhombicus (Linnaeus, 1758)^{i c g b}
- Limnephilus rohweri Banks, 1908^{i c g}
- Limnephilus rothi Denning, 1966^{i c g}
- Limnephilus sackeni Banks, 1930^{i c g}
- Limnephilus samoedus (McLachlan, 1880)^{i c g}
- Limnephilus sansoni Banks, 1918^{i c g}
- Limnephilus santanus Ross, 1949^{i c g}
- Limnephilus secludens Banks, 1914^{i c g}
- Limnephilus sericeus (Say, 1824)^{i c g b}
- Limnephilus sibiricus Martynov, 1929^{i c g}
- Limnephilus sibiricusoccidentis Spuris, 1988^{i c g}
- Limnephilus sierrata Denning, 1968^{i c g}
- Limnephilus signifer Martynov, 1909^{i c g}
- Limnephilus sitchensis (Kolenati, 1859)^{i c g}
- Limnephilus solidus (Hagen, 1861)^{i c g}
- Limnephilus soporatus Scudder, 1890^{i c g}
- Limnephilus sparsus Curtis, 1834^{i c g}
- Limnephilus sperryi (Banks, 1914)^{i c g}
- Limnephilus spinatus Banks, 1914^{i c g b}
- Limnephilus stigma Curtis, 1834^{i c g}
- Limnephilus subcentralis Brauer, 1857^{i c g}
- Limnephilus sublunatus Provancher, 1877^{i c g}
- Limnephilus submonilifer Walker, 1852^{i c g b}
- Limnephilus subniditus McLachlan, 1875^{i c g}
- Limnephilus subnitidus McLachlan, 1875^{g}
- Limnephilus sylviae Denning, 1949^{i c g}
- Limnephilus taloga Ross, 1938^{i c g}
- Limnephilus tarsalis (Banks, 1920)^{i c g}
- Limnephilus tauricus Schmid, 1964^{i c g}
- Limnephilus thorus Ross, 1938^{i c g}
- Limnephilus tibeticus Schmid, 1966^{i c g}
- Limnephilus tiunovae Arefina & Levanidova in Arefina, Ivanov, & Levanidova, 1996^{i c g}
- Limnephilus transcaucasicus Martynov, 1909^{i c g}
- Limnephilus tricalcaratus (Mosely, 1936)^{i c g}
- Limnephilus tulatus Denning, 1962^{i c g}
- Limnephilus turanus (Martynov, 1928)^{i c g}
- Limnephilus uintah Nimmo, 1991^{i c g}
- Limnephilus vallei Malicky, 2004^{g}
- Limnephilus vittatus (Fabricius, 1798)^{i c g}
- Limnephilus wittmeri Malicky, 1972^{i c g}
- Limnephilus xanthodes McLachlan, 1873^{i c g}
- Limnephilus znojkoi Martynov, 1938^{i c g}

Data sources: i = ITIS, c = Catalogue of Life, g = GBIF, b = Bugguide.net
