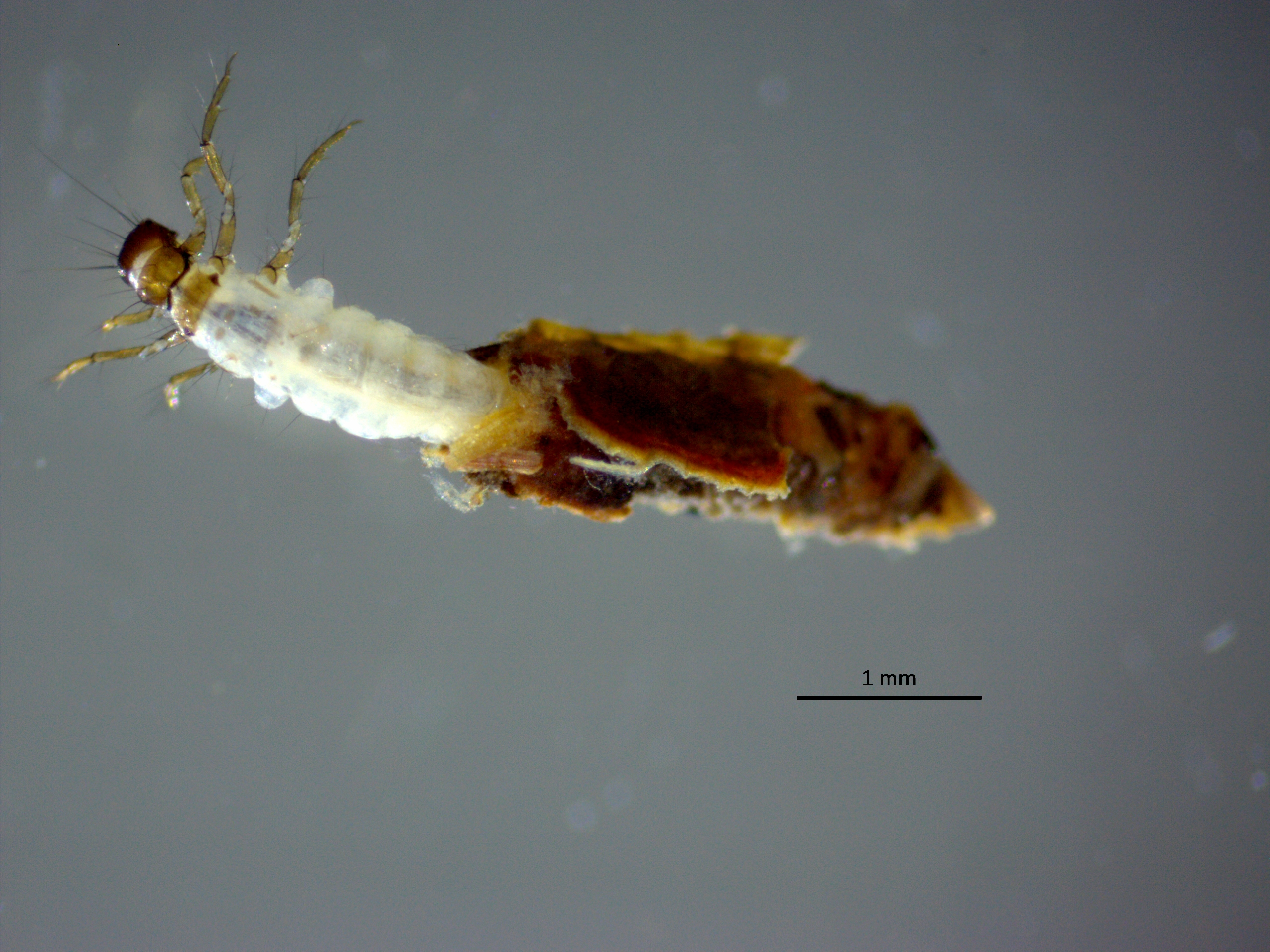
- Anabolia

Scientific classification
- Kingdom: Animalia
- Phylum: Arthropoda
- Clade: Pancrustacea
- Class: Insecta
- Order: Trichoptera
- Family: Limnephilidae
- Subfamily: Limnephilinae; Kolenati, 1848

Tribes
- Chaetopterygini Hagen, 1858; Chilostigmini Schmid, 1955; Limnephilini Kolenati, 1848; Stenophylacini Schmid, 1955

= Limnephilinae =

Subfamily of caddisflies

Limnephilinae is a subfamily of northern caddisflies in the family Limnephilidae. More than 600 described species have been recorded mostly from throughout the northern hemisphere.

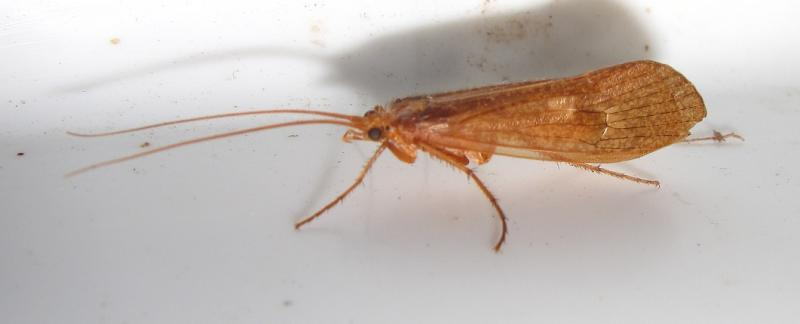
Stenophylax permistus

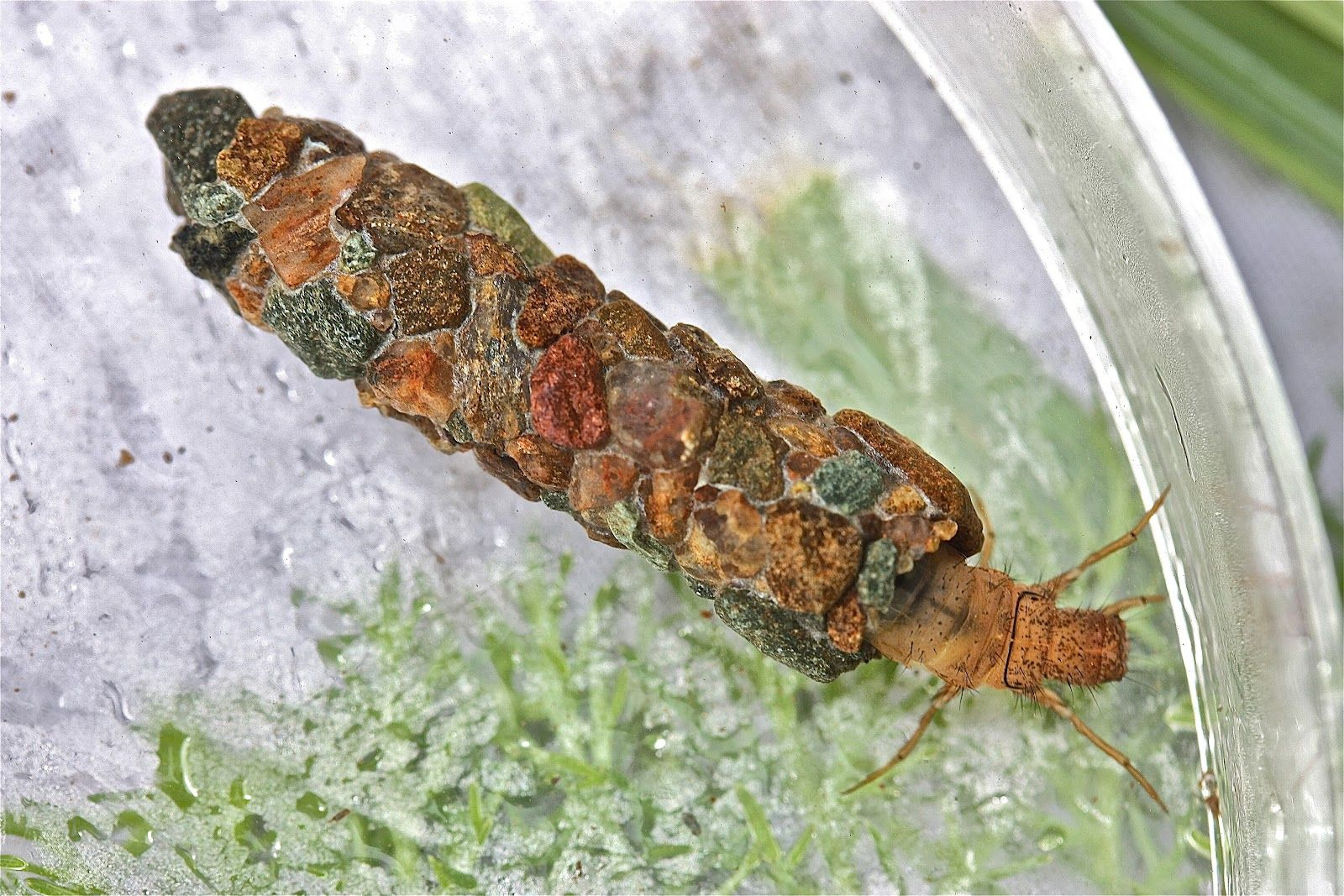
Pycnopsyche

== Genera ==
These 67 genera belong to the subfamily Limnephilinae:

- Acrophylax Brauer, 1867^{i c g}
- Allogamus Schmid, 1955^{i c g}
- Alpopysche Botosaneanu & Giudicelli, 2002
- Anabolia Stephens, 1837^{i c g b}
- Anisogamodes Martynov, 1924^{i c g}
- Anisogamus McLachlan, 1874^{i c g}
- Annitella Klapalek, 1907^{i c g}
- Arctopora Thomson, 1891^{i c g}
- Asynarchus McLachlan, 1880^{i c g b}
- Badukiella Mey, 1979^{i c g}
- Brachypsyche Schmid, 1952^{i c g}
- Chaetopterna Martynov, 1913^{i c g}
- Chaetopteroides Kumanski, 1987^{i c g}
- Chaetopterygopsis JPEF Stein, 1874^{i c g}
- Chaetopteryx Stephens, 1829^{i c g}
- Chiloecia Navas, 1930^{i c g}
- Chilostigma McLachlan, 1876^{i c g b}
- Chilostigmodes Martynov, 1914^{i c g}
- Chionophylax Schmid, 1951^{i c g}
- Chyrandra Ross, 1944^{c g}
- Clistoronia Banks, 1916^{i c g b}
- Clostoeca Banks, 1943^{i c g b}
- Consorophylax Schmid, 1955^{i c g}
- Desmona Denning, 1954^{i c g b}
- Enoicyla Rambur, 1842^{i c g}
- Enoicylopsis Navas, 1917^{i c g}
- Frenesia Betten & Mosely, 1940^{i c g b}
- Glyphopsyche Banks, 1904^{i c g b}
- Glyphotaelius Stephens, 1833^{i c g}
- Grammotaulius Kolenati, 1848^{i c g}
- Grensia Ross, 1944^{i c g}
- Halesochila Banks, 1907^{i c g b}
- Halesus Stephens, 1836^{i c g}
- Hesperophylax Banks, 1916^{i c g b}
- Homophylax Banks, 1900^{i c g b}
- Hydatophylax Wallengren, 1891^{i c g b}
- Isogamus Schmid, 1955^{i c g}
- Kelgena Mey, 1979^{i c g}
- Lenarchus Martynov, 1914^{i c g b}
- Lepnevaina Wiggins, 1987^{i c g}
- Leptophylax Banks, 1900^{i c g}
- Leptotaulius Schmid, 1955^{i c g}
- Limnephilus Leach, 1815^{i c g b}
- Melampophylax Schmid, 1955^{i c g}
- Mesophylax McLachlan, 1882^{i c g}
- Nemotaulius Banks, 1906^{i c g b}
- Parachiona Thomson, 1891^{i c g}
- Phanocelia Banks, 1943^{i c g b}
- Philarctus McLachlan, 1880^{i c g}
- Philocasca Ross, 1941^{i c g b}
- Pielus Navas, 1935^{i c g}
- Platycentropus Ulmer, 1905^{i c g b}
- Platyphylax McLachlan, 1871^{i c g}
- Potamophylax Wallengren, 1891^{i c g}
- Pseudopsilopteryx Schmid, 1952^{i c g}
- Psilopterna Martynov, 1915^{i c g}
- Psilopteryx Stein, 1874^{i c g}
- Psychoglypha Ross, 1944^{i c g b}
- Psychoronia Banks, 1916^{i c g}
- Pycnopsyche Banks, 1905^{i c g b}
- Rhadicoleptus Wallengren, 1891^{i c g}
- Rivulophilus Nishimoto, Nozaki, & Ruiter, 2001
- Rizeiella Sipahiler, 1986^{i c g}
- Stenophylax Kolenati, 1848^{i c g}
- Thermophylax Nimmo, 1995^{i c g}
- Vareshiana Marinkovic-Gospodnetic, 1967^{i c g}
- † Tricheopteryx Cockerell, 1927

Data sources: i = ITIS, c = Catalogue of Life, g = GBIF, b = Bugguide.net
