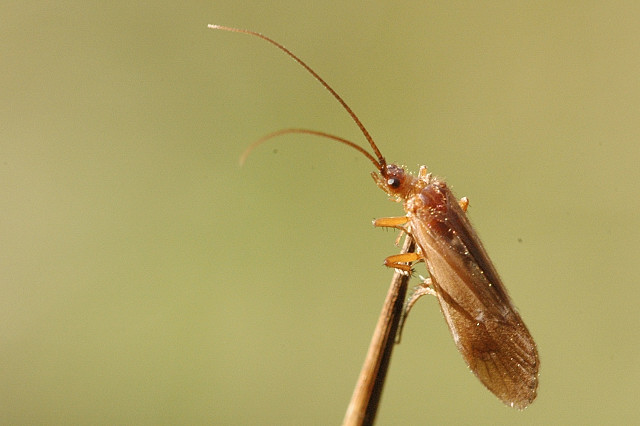
- Chaetopteryx villosa

Scientific classification
- Domain: Eukaryota
- Kingdom: Animalia
- Phylum: Arthropoda
- Class: Insecta
- Order: Trichoptera
- Family: Limnephilidae
- Subfamily: Limnephilinae
- Tribe: Chaetopterygini; Hagen, 1858

= Chaetopterygini =

Tribe of caddisflies

Chaetopterygini is a tribe of northern caddisflies in the family Limnephilidae. There are about 11 genera and at least 60 described species in Chaetopterygini.

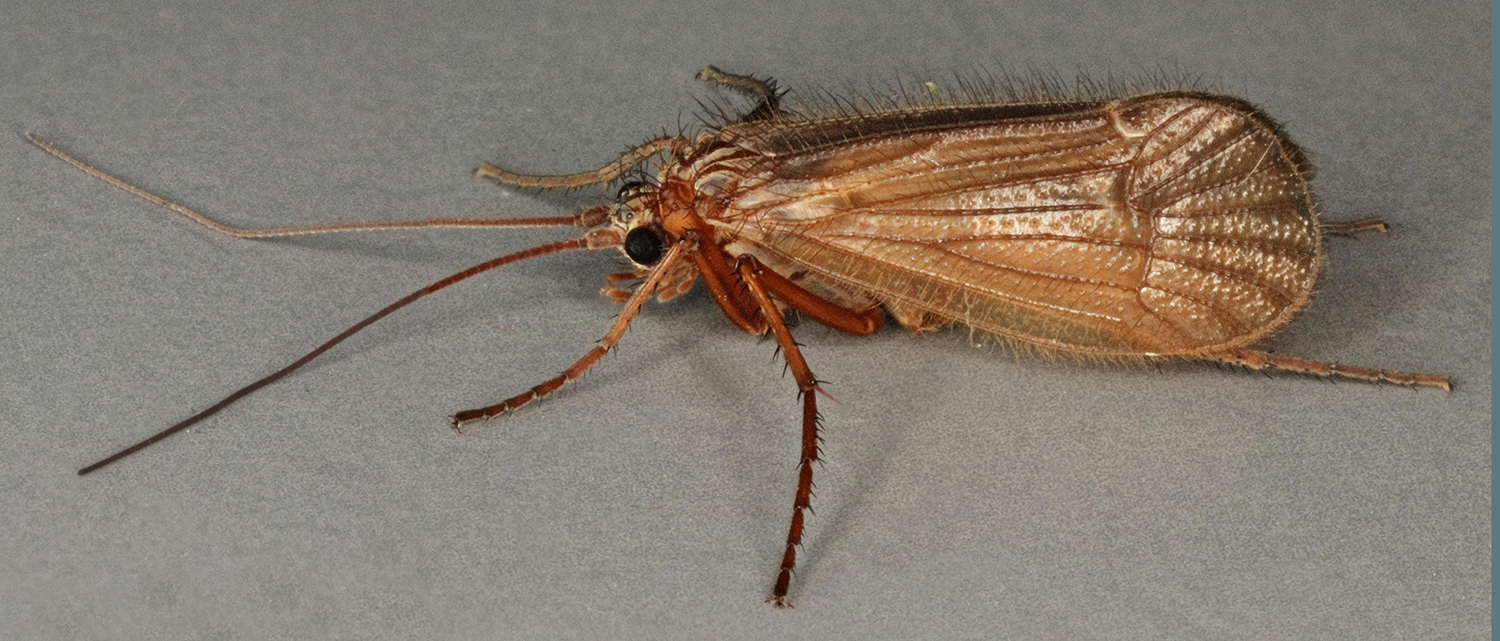
Chaetopteryx villosa

== Genera ==
These 11 genera belong to the tribe Chaetopterygini:

- Annitella Klapalek, 1907
- Badukiella Mey, 1979
- Chaetopterna Martynov, 1913
- Chaetopteroides Kumanski, 1987
- Chaetopterygopsis Stein, 1874
- Chaetopteryx Stephens, 1829
- Kelgena Mey, 1979
- Pseudopsilopteryx Schmid, 1952
- Psilopteryx Stein, 1874
- Rizeiella Sipahiler, 1986
- Vareshiana Marinkovic-Gospodnetic, 1967
