= Limnephilus indivisus =

Scientific classification
- Kingdom: Animalia
- Phylum: Arthropoda
- Clade: Pancrustacea
- Class: Insecta
- Order: Trichoptera
- Family: Limnephilidae
- Tribe: Limnephilini
- Genus: Limnephilus
- Species: L. indivisus

Binomial name
- Limnephilus indivisus Walker, 1852

Synonyms
- Limnephilus subguttatus Walker, 1852

Species of caddisfly

Limnephilus indivisus is a species of northern caddisfly in the family Limnephilidae. It is found in North America.
