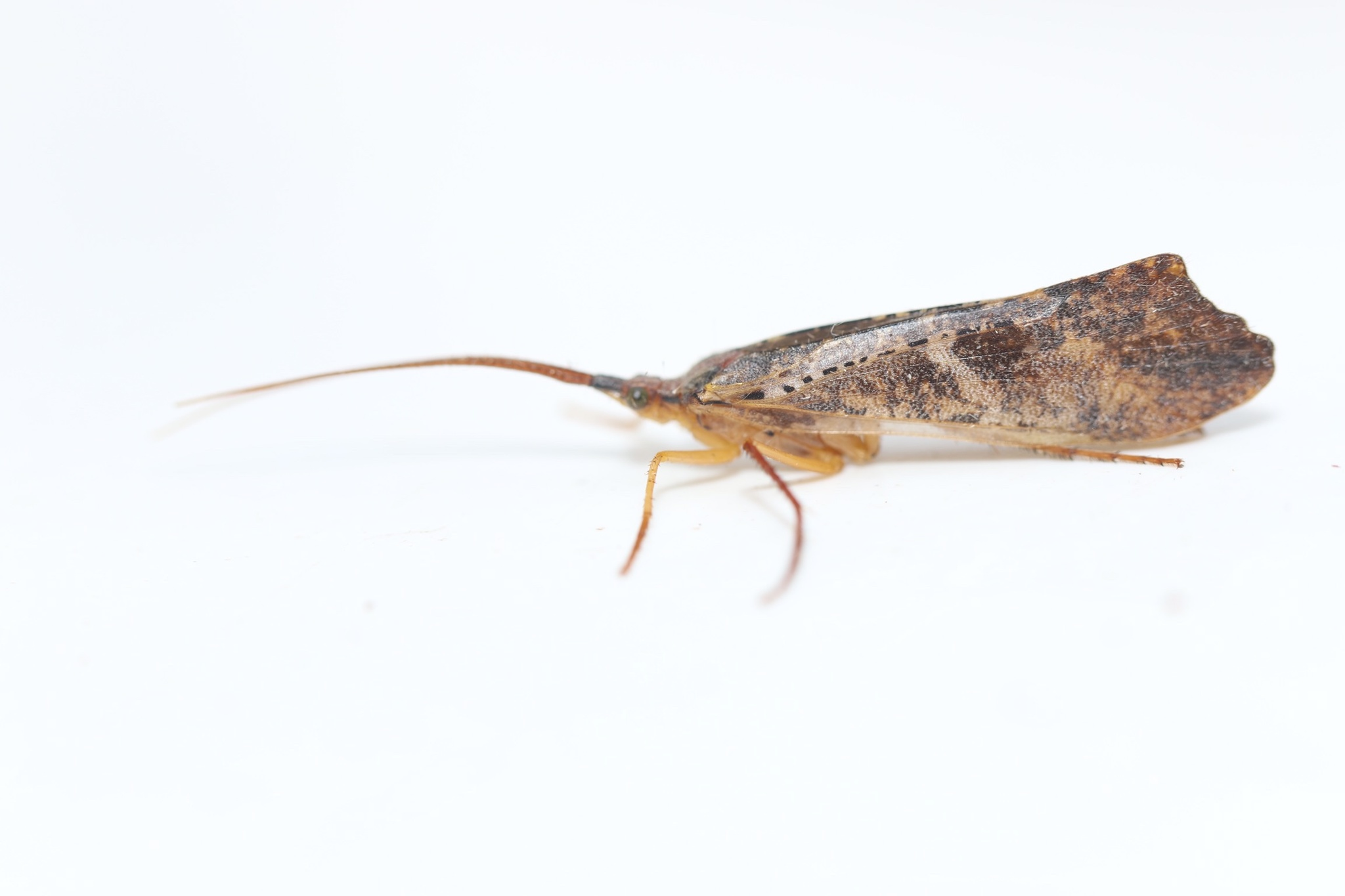

Scientific classification
- Kingdom: Animalia
- Phylum: Arthropoda
- Clade: Pancrustacea
- Class: Insecta
- Order: Trichoptera
- Family: Limnephilidae
- Tribe: Limnephilini
- Genus: Nemotaulius
- Species: N. hostilis

Binomial name
- Nemotaulius hostilis (Hagen, 1873)

Synonyms
- Glyphotaelius hostilis Hagen, 1873

= Nemotaulius hostilis =

Species of caddisfly

Nemotaulius hostilis is a species of northern caddisfly in the family Limnephilidae. It is found in North America.
