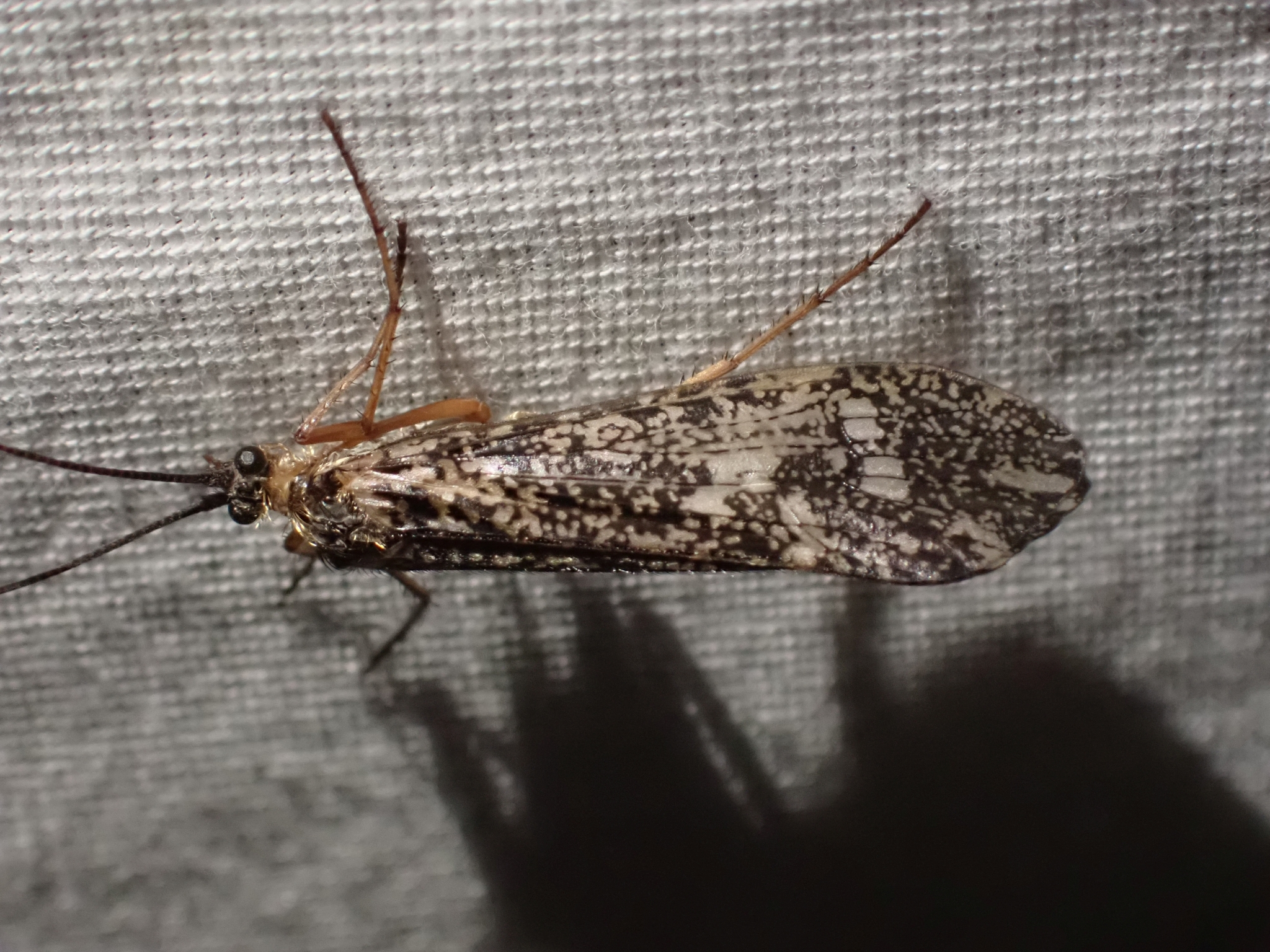

Scientific classification
- Domain: Eukaryota
- Kingdom: Animalia
- Phylum: Arthropoda
- Class: Insecta
- Order: Trichoptera
- Family: Limnephilidae
- Tribe: Limnephilini
- Genus: Clistoronia
- Species: C. magnifica

Binomial name
- Clistoronia magnifica (Banks, 1899)

Synonyms
- Clistoronia caroli (Denning, 1941); Halesus magnifica Banks, 1899

= Clistoronia magnifica =

Species of caddisfly

Clistoronia magnifica is a species of northern caddisfly in the family Limnephilidae. It is found in North America.
