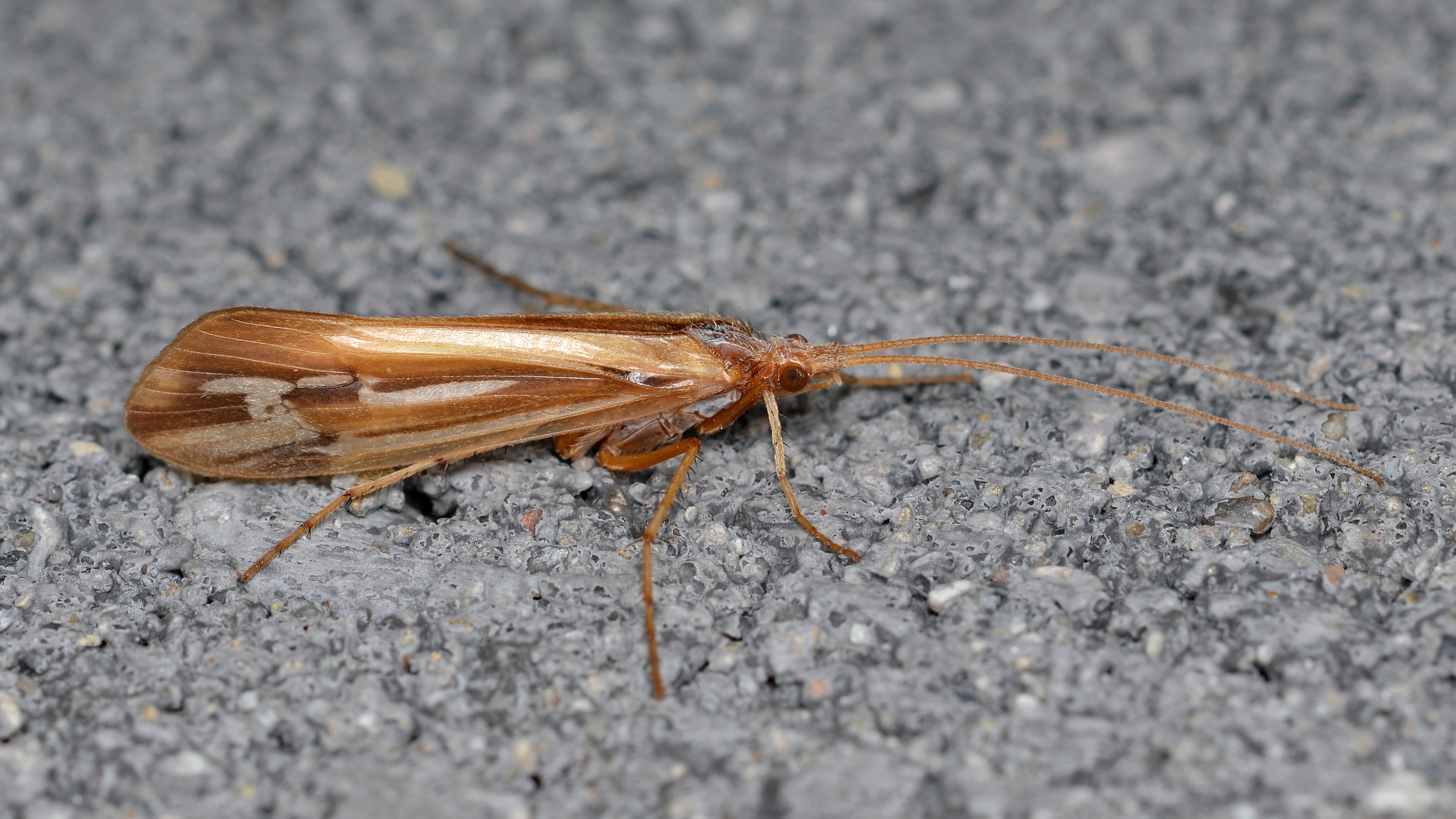

Scientific classification
- Kingdom: Animalia
- Phylum: Arthropoda
- Clade: Pancrustacea
- Class: Insecta
- Order: Trichoptera
- Family: Limnephilidae
- Tribe: Limnephilini
- Genus: Limnephilus
- Species: L. ornatus

Binomial name
- Limnephilus ornatus Banks, 1897

= Limnephilus ornatus =

Species of caddisfly

Limnephilus ornatus is a species of northern caddisfly in the family Limnephilidae. It is found in North America.
