= Hesperophylax magnus =

Scientific classification
- Domain: Eukaryota
- Kingdom: Animalia
- Phylum: Arthropoda
- Class: Insecta
- Order: Trichoptera
- Family: Limnephilidae
- Tribe: Limnephilini
- Genus: Hesperophylax
- Species: H. magnus

Binomial name
- Hesperophylax magnus Banks, 1918

Species of caddisfly

Hesperophylax magnus is a species of northern caddisfly in the family Limnephilidae. It is found in North America.
