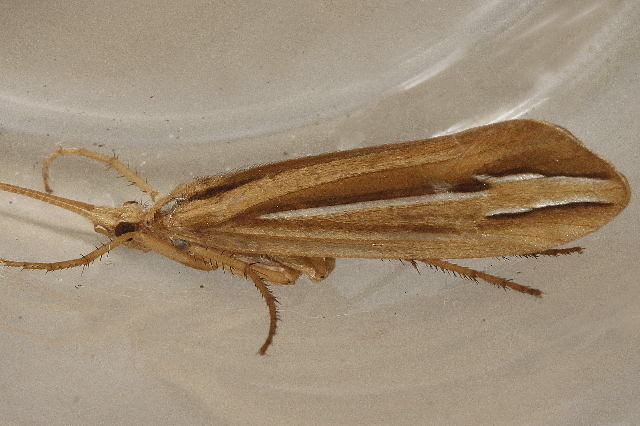

Scientific classification
- Domain: Eukaryota
- Kingdom: Animalia
- Phylum: Arthropoda
- Class: Insecta
- Order: Trichoptera
- Family: Limnephilidae
- Tribe: Limnephilini
- Genus: Hesperophylax
- Species: H. designatus

Binomial name
- Hesperophylax designatus (Walker, 1852)

Synonyms
- Hesperophylax incisus Banks, 1943; Limnephilus designatus Walker, 1852

= Hesperophylax designatus =

Species of caddisfly

Hesperophylax designatus, known generally as the silver-striped sedge or giant golden caddis, is a species of northern caddisfly in the family Limnephilidae. It is found in North America.

== Subspecies ==
These two subspecies belong to the species Hesperophylax designatus:

- Hesperophylax designatus designatus^{g}
- Hesperophylax designatus isolatus Banks, 1943^{i c g}

Data sources: i = ITIS, c = Catalogue of Life, g = GBIF, b = Bugguide.net
