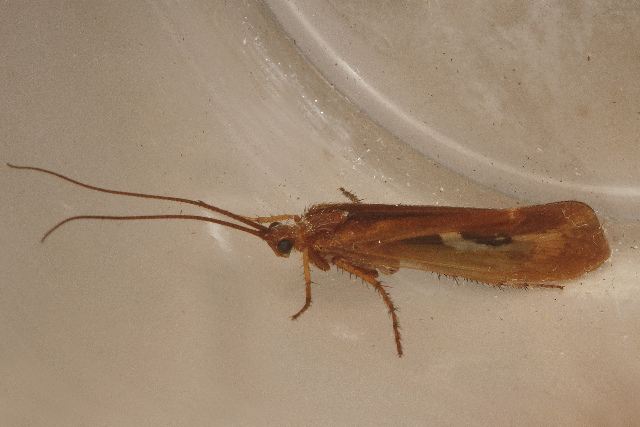

Scientific classification
- Kingdom: Animalia
- Phylum: Arthropoda
- Clade: Pancrustacea
- Class: Insecta
- Order: Trichoptera
- Family: Limnephilidae
- Tribe: Limnephilini
- Genus: Limnephilus
- Species: L. externus

Binomial name
- Limnephilus externus Hagen, 1861

Synonyms
- Limnephilus oslari Banks, 1907; Limnephilus tersus Betten, 1934

= Limnephilus externus =

Species of caddisfly

Limnephilus externus is a species of northern caddisfly in the family Limnephilidae. It is found in North America and Europe.
