= Lenarchus rillus =

Scientific classification
- Kingdom: Animalia
- Phylum: Arthropoda
- Clade: Pancrustacea
- Class: Insecta
- Order: Trichoptera
- Family: Limnephilidae
- Tribe: Limnephilini
- Genus: Lenarchus
- Species: L. rillus

Binomial name
- Lenarchus rillus (Milne, 1935)

Synonyms
- Lenarchus oreus (Milne, 1935); Limnephilus oreus Milne, 1935; Limnephilus rillus Milne, 1935

Species of caddisfly

Lenarchus rillus is a species of northern caddisfly in the family Limnephilidae. It is found in North America.
