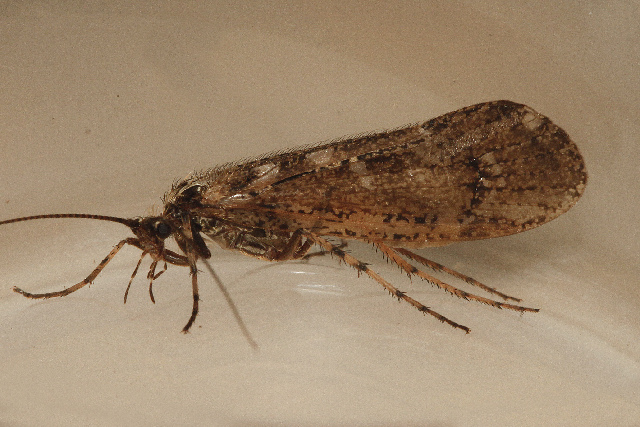

Scientific classification
- Kingdom: Animalia
- Phylum: Arthropoda
- Clade: Pancrustacea
- Class: Insecta
- Order: Trichoptera
- Family: Limnephilidae
- Tribe: Limnephilini
- Genus: Lenarchus
- Species: L. vastus

Binomial name
- Lenarchus vastus (Hagen, 1861)

Synonyms
- Lenarchus intermedius (Banks, 1918); Limnephilus intermedius Banks, 1918; Limnephilus vastus Hagen, 1861

= Lenarchus vastus =

Species of caddisfly

Lenarchus vastus is a species of northern caddisfly in the family Limnephilidae. It is found in North America.
