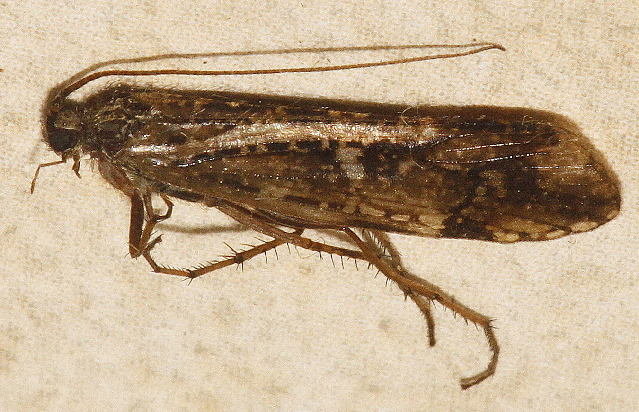

Scientific classification
- Kingdom: Animalia
- Phylum: Arthropoda
- Clade: Pancrustacea
- Class: Insecta
- Order: Trichoptera
- Family: Limnephilidae
- Tribe: Limnephilini
- Genus: Limnephilus
- Species: L. nogus

Binomial name
- Limnephilus nogus Ross, 1944

= Limnephilus nogus =

Species of caddisfly

Limnephilus nogus is a species of northern caddisfly in the family Limnephilidae. It is commonly found in North America.
