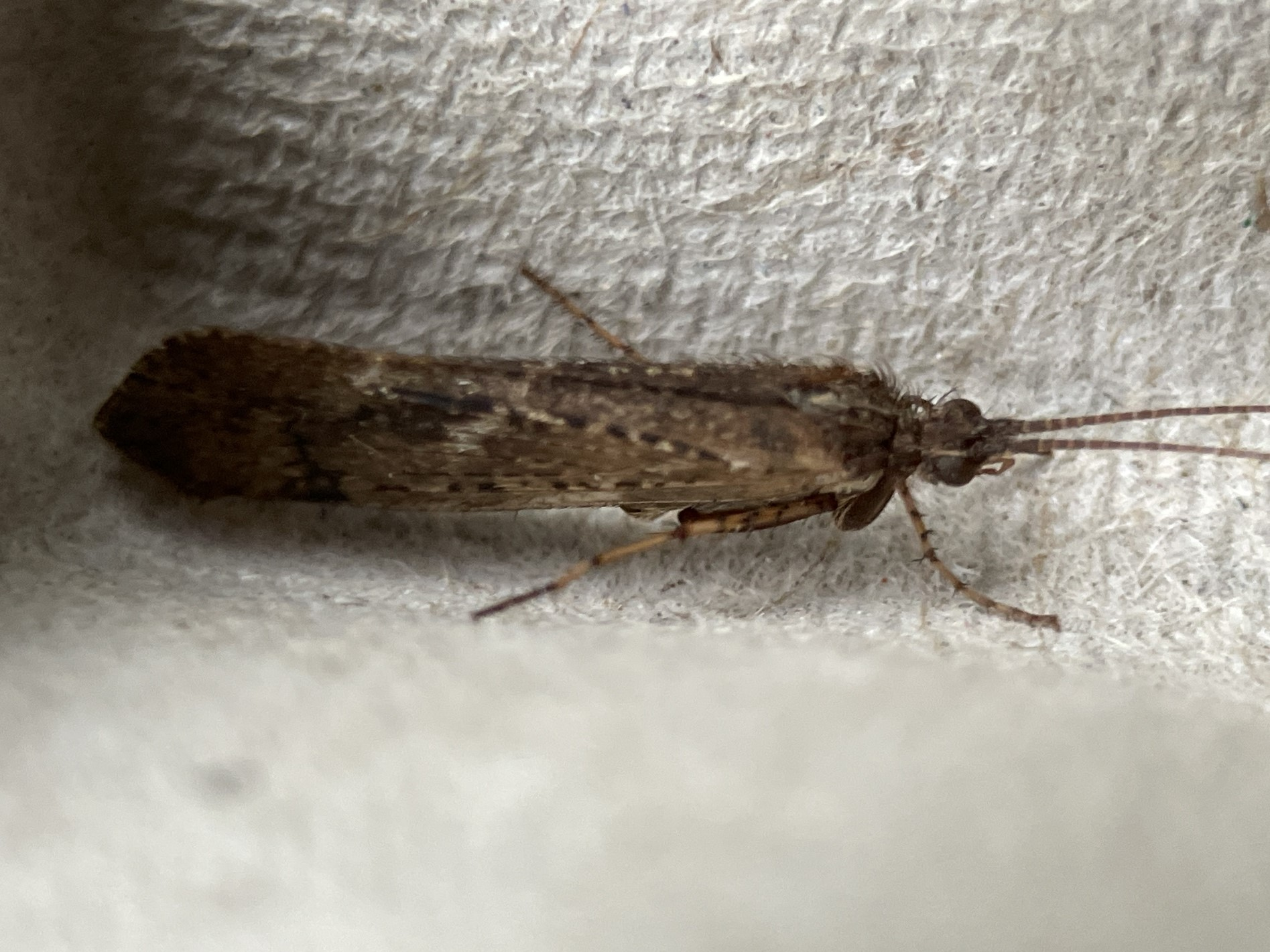

Scientific classification
- Kingdom: Animalia
- Phylum: Arthropoda
- Clade: Pancrustacea
- Class: Insecta
- Order: Trichoptera
- Family: Limnephilidae
- Tribe: Limnephilini
- Genus: Limnephilus
- Species: L. submonilifer

Binomial name
- Limnephilus submonilifer Walker, 1852

Synonyms
- Limnephilus pudicus Hagen, 1861

= Limnephilus submonilifer =

Species of caddisfly

Limnephilus submonilifer is a species of northern caddisfly in the family Limnephilidae. It is found in North America.
