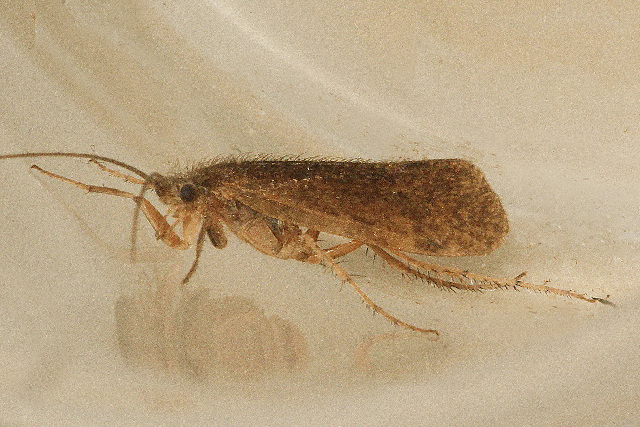

Scientific classification
- Kingdom: Animalia
- Phylum: Arthropoda
- Clade: Pancrustacea
- Class: Insecta
- Order: Trichoptera
- Family: Limnephilidae
- Tribe: Limnephilini
- Genus: Limnephilus
- Species: L. concolor

Binomial name
- Limnephilus concolor Banks, 1899

Synonyms
- Limnephilus cerus Ross & Spencer, 1952; Limnephilus lunonus Ross, 1941

= Limnephilus concolor =

Species of insect

Limnephilus concolor is a species of northern caddisfly in the family Limnephilidae. It is found in North America.
