= Limnephilus spinatus =

Scientific classification
- Kingdom: Animalia
- Phylum: Arthropoda
- Clade: Pancrustacea
- Class: Insecta
- Order: Trichoptera
- Family: Limnephilidae
- Tribe: Limnephilini
- Genus: Limnephilus
- Species: L. spinatus

Binomial name
- Limnephilus spinatus Banks, 1914

Species of caddisfly

Limnephilus spinatus is a species of northern caddisfly in the family Limnephilidae. It is found in North America.
