= Anabolia consocia =

Scientific classification
- Kingdom: Animalia
- Phylum: Arthropoda
- Clade: Pancrustacea
- Class: Insecta
- Order: Trichoptera
- Family: Limnephilidae
- Tribe: Limnephilini
- Genus: Anabolia
- Species: A. consocia

Binomial name
- Anabolia consocia (Walker, 1852)

Synonyms
- Anabolia medialis (Banks, 1905); Anabolia oslari Ling, 1938

Species of caddisfly

Anabolia consocia is a species of northern caddisfly in the family Limnephilidae. It is found in North America.
