= Arctopora =

Scientific classification
- Kingdom: Animalia
- Phylum: Arthropoda
- Clade: Pancrustacea
- Class: Insecta
- Order: Trichoptera
- Family: Limnephilidae
- Subfamily: Limnephilinae
- Tribe: Limnephilini
- Genus: Arctopora; Thomson, 1891

Genus of caddisflies

Arctopora is a genus of insect belonging to the family Limnephilidae. The genus was first described by Thomson in 1891.

The species of this genus are found in Europe and Northern America. This species has been found in small wetlands (< 1 meter depth) with a mud bottom and extensive emergent vegetation.

Species:

- Arctopora trimaculata (Zetterstedt, 1840)
