= Platycentropus radiatus =

Scientific classification
- Kingdom: Animalia
- Phylum: Arthropoda
- Clade: Pancrustacea
- Class: Insecta
- Order: Trichoptera
- Family: Limnephilidae
- Genus: Platycentropus
- Species: P. radiatus

Binomial name
- Platycentropus radiatus (Say, 1824)

Species of caddisfly

Platycentropus radiatus, the chocolate and cream sedge, is a species of northern caddisfly in the family Limnephilidae. It is found in North America.
