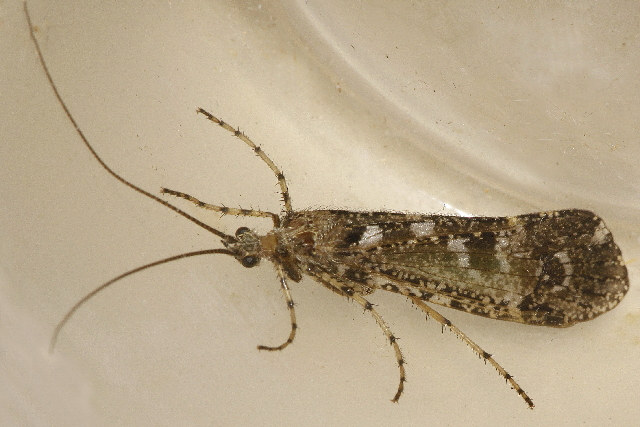
- Lenarchus rho

Scientific classification
- Kingdom: Animalia
- Phylum: Arthropoda
- Clade: Pancrustacea
- Class: Insecta
- Order: Trichoptera
- Family: Limnephilidae
- Subfamily: Limnephilinae
- Tribe: Limnephilini
- Genus: Lenarchus; Martynov, 1914

Subgenera
- Lenarchus (Lenarchus) Martynov, 1914; Lenarchus (Paralenarchus) Schmid, 1952; Lenarchus (Prolenarchus) Schmid, 1952

= Lenarchus =

Genus of caddisflies

Lenarchus is a genus of northern caddisflies in the family Limnephilidae. There are about 13 described species in Lenarchus.

== Species ==
These 13 species belong to the genus Lenarchus:

- Lenarchus bicornis (McLachlan, 1880)
- Lenarchus brevipennis (Banks, 1899)
- Lenarchus crassus (Banks, 1920)
- Lenarchus devius (McLachlan, 1880)
- Lenarchus expansus Martynov, 1914
- Lenarchus fautini (Denning, 1949)
- Lenarchus fuscostramineus Schmid, 1952
- Lenarchus gravidus (Hagen, 1861)
- Lenarchus keratus (Ross, 1938)
- Lenarchus productus (Morton, 1896)
- Lenarchus rho (Milne, 1935)
- Lenarchus rillus (Milne, 1935)
- Lenarchus vastus (Hagen, 1861)
