= Platycentropus =

Scientific classification
- Kingdom: Animalia
- Phylum: Arthropoda
- Clade: Pancrustacea
- Class: Insecta
- Order: Trichoptera
- Family: Limnephilidae
- Subfamily: Limnephilinae
- Tribe: Limnephilini
- Genus: Platycentropus; Ulmer, 1905

Genus of caddisflies

Platycentropus is a genus of northern caddisflies in the family Limnephilidae. There are at least three described species in Platycentropus.

== Species ==
These three species belong to the genus Platycentropus:

- Platycentropus amicus (Hagen, 1861)
- Platycentropus indistinctus (Walker, 1852)
- Platycentropus radiatus (Say, 1824) (chocolate and cream sedge)
