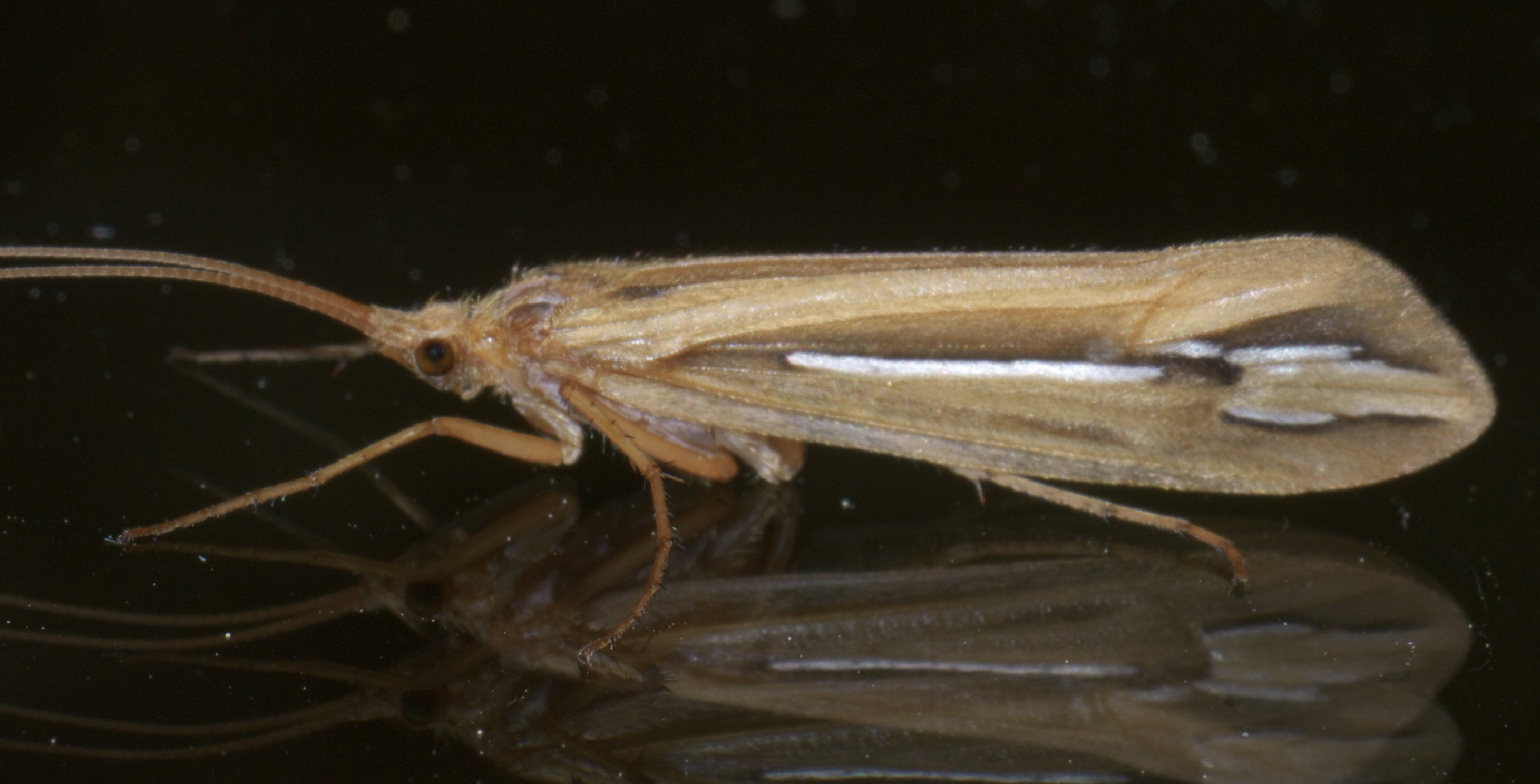

Scientific classification
- Kingdom: Animalia
- Phylum: Arthropoda
- Clade: Pancrustacea
- Class: Insecta
- Order: Trichoptera
- Family: Limnephilidae
- Subfamily: Limnephilinae
- Tribe: Limnephilini
- Genus: Hesperophylax; Banks, 1916

= Hesperophylax =

Genus of caddisflies

Hesperophylax is a genus of northern caddisflies in the family Limnephilidae. There are about seven described species in Hesperophylax.

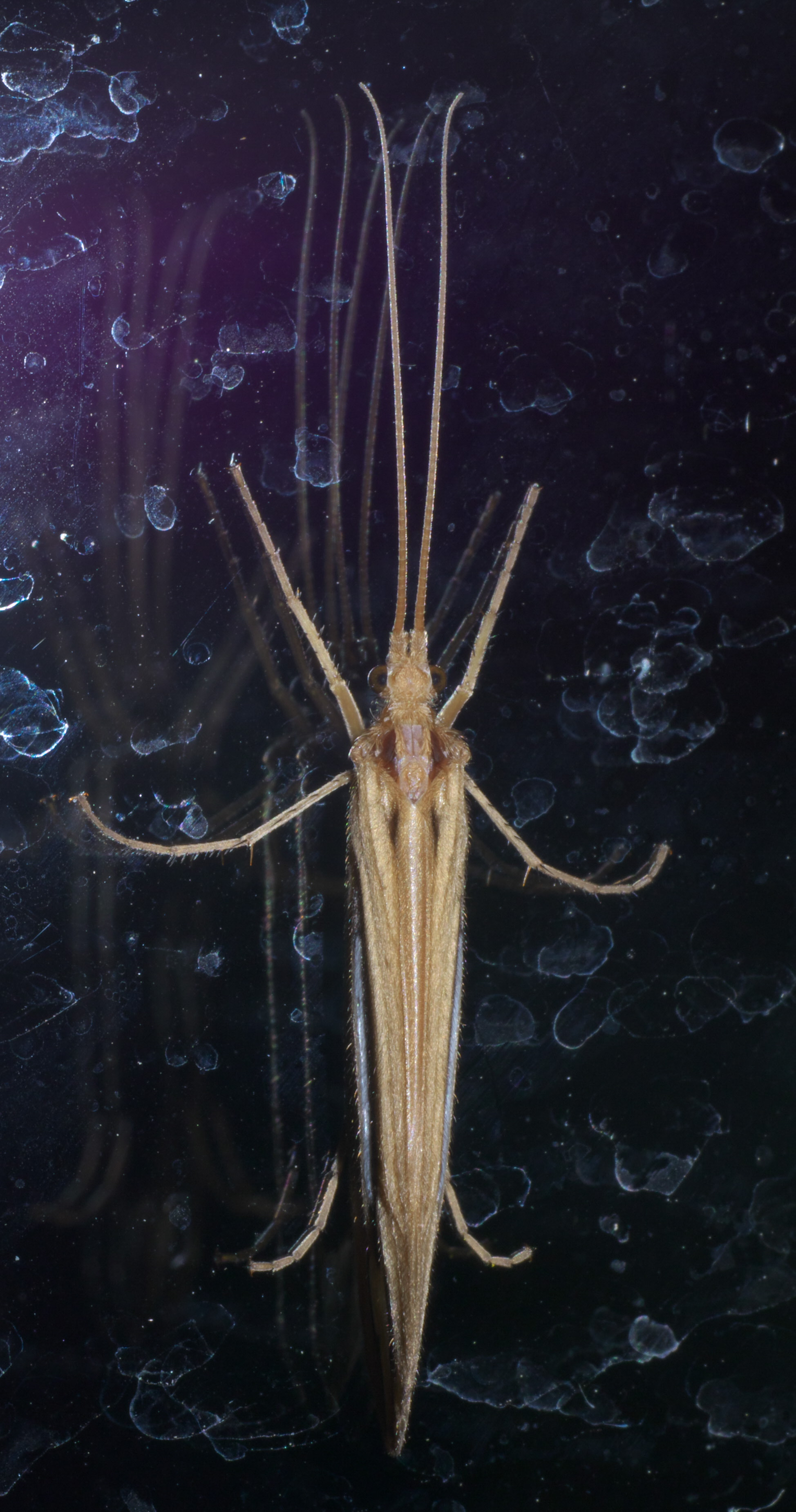

== Species ==
These seven species belong to the genus Hesperophylax:

- Hesperophylax alaskensis (Banks, 1908)
- Hesperophylax consimilis (Banks, 1900)
- Hesperophylax designatus (Walker, 1852) (silver-striped sedge)
- Hesperophylax magnus Banks, 1918
- Hesperophylax mexico Parker & Wiggins, 1985
- Hesperophylax minutus Ling, 1938
- Hesperophylax occidentalis (Banks, 1908)
