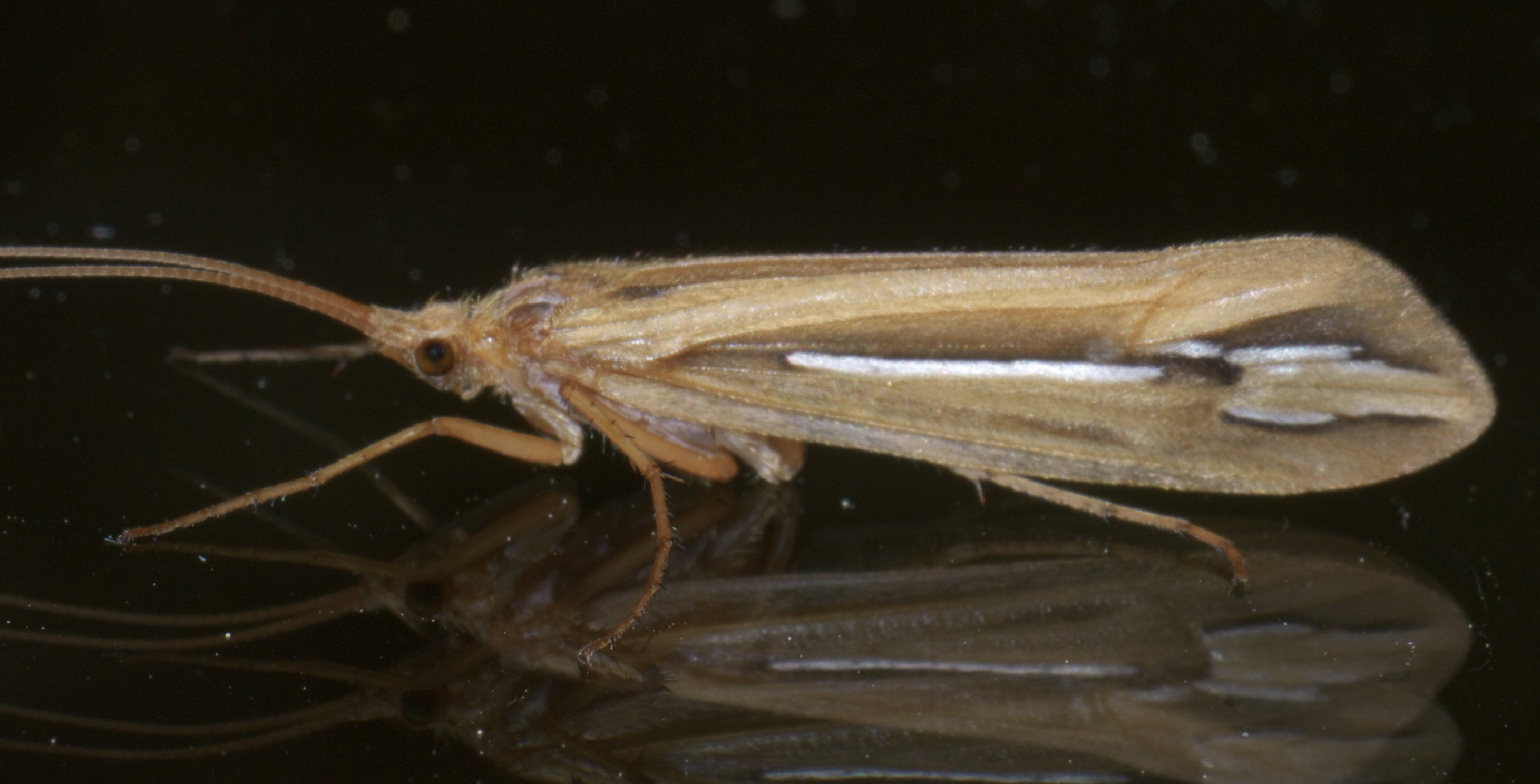

Scientific classification
- Kingdom: Animalia
- Phylum: Arthropoda
- Class: Insecta
- Order: Trichoptera
- Family: Limnephilidae
- Genus: Hesperophylax
- Species: H. occidentalis

Binomial name
- Hesperophylax occidentalis Banks, 1908

Synonyms
- Platyphylax occidentalis

= Hesperophylax occidentalis =

Species of insect

Hesperophylax occidentalis is a Hesperophylax, a genus of northern caddisflies, with about six other described species

== Distribution and habitat ==
Hesperophylax occidentalis is native to western North America, where it lives in a variety of aquatic habitats; especially streams, springs, permanent ponds, and high-elevation water bodies.

In studies of high altitude and permanence gradient wetlands (e.g., Colorado), this species has been recorded in both flowing water and "flow-through" permanent ponds — including spring outflow drainages of lakes.

Because it belongs to the Limnephilidae family ("northern case-makers"), it tolerates a range of lotic (stream) and lentic (pond, spring) habitats, often in cooler or montane regions.

== Life history and ecology ==
=== Life cycle ===
H. occidentalis has a univoltine life history: one generation per year.

- Eggs are deposited (oviposited) beneath submerged rocks.
- Larvae build portable cases (a common trait in Limnephilidae), using materials such as small rocks, sand, or plant remains, and carry these cases around for protection.
- Pupal stage: the larval case is typically affixed to stones during pupation.
- Adults (the winged caddisfly) emerge after pupation and disperse; as with many caddisflies, adults resemble moths but have hairy, not scaly, wings.

=== Feeding and behavior ===
Larvae of H. occidentalis are generally scrapers and collector-gatherers, using modified mouthparts, specifically a pectinate comb of spines (a "diatom rake"), to scrape algae and periphyton off submerged surfaces such as stones. They are strong swimmers and crawl among substrate to forage.

The species' presence in a variety of aquatic habitats; from flowing springs to permanent ponds; suggests ecological flexibility, likely contributing to its persistence across different western North American fresh water ecosystems.

Studies in wetland permanence gradients in Colorado found H. occidentalis among the more common caddisfly species in both streams and permanent ponds associated with pond outflows.

== Role in ecosystem and dignificance ==
Caddisflies, including H. occidentalis, are important parts of fresh water ecosystems. Members of Trichoptera are among the key marine invertebrates that contribute to the decomposition of organic matter (through shredding of leaves or plant debris) or the processing of periphyton and algae, facilitating nutrient and energy flow.

Because their larvae are aquatic and their adults are terrestrial and often capable fliers, caddisflies are a link between aquatic and terrestrial food webs. Fish, amphibians, and other predators commonly eat caddisfly larvae, pupae, and adults.

As a member of Limnephilidae, one of the largest and most diverse caddisfly families in North America, H. occidentalis helps maintain biodiversity and ecological complexity in fresh water habitats, especially in high elevation, spring fed, or pond ecosystems where species composition can be relatively specialized.

== Research on silk production ==
Although detailed molecular studies of H. occidentalis' silk gland proteins remain limited, comparative research on case making caddisflies shows that silk from these species (like those in Limnephilidae) is compositionally different from net spinning species.

Generally, caddisfly larvae produce silk from specialized salivary glands. This silk is used to adhere substrate materials (stones, plant fragments) to construct protective portable cases, which serve as camouflage, protection from predators, and as stable housing while feeding or during pupation.

The use of silk to build such cases is a major evolutionary adaptation of the suborder Integripalpia (which includes Limnephilidae), distinguishing them from other caddisflies that build nets, retreats, or fixed structures.

== See also ==
- Hesperophylax
- Limnephilidae
- Caddisflies
