= Nemotaulius =

Scientific classification
- Kingdom: Animalia
- Phylum: Arthropoda
- Clade: Pancrustacea
- Class: Insecta
- Order: Trichoptera
- Family: Limnephilidae
- Subfamily: Limnephilinae
- Tribe: Limnephilini
- Genus: Nemotaulius; Banks, 1906

Subgenera
- Nemotaulius (Macrotaulius) Schmid, 1952; Nemotaulius (Nemotaulius) Banks, 1906

Genus of caddisflies

Nemotaulius is a genus of northern caddisflies in the family Limnephilidae. There are about eight described species in Nemotaulius.

== Species ==
These eight species belong to the genus Nemotaulius:

- Nemotaulius admorsus (McLachlan, 1866)
- Nemotaulius amurensis Nimmo, 1995
- Nemotaulius brevilinea (McLachlan, 1871)
- Nemotaulius coreanus Olah, 1985
- Nemotaulius hostilis (Hagen, 1873)
- Nemotaulius miyakei (Nakahara, 1914)
- Nemotaulius mutatus (McLachlan, 1872)
- Nemotaulius punctatolineatus (Retzius, 1783)
