= Limnephilus sericeus =

Scientific classification
- Kingdom: Animalia
- Phylum: Arthropoda
- Clade: Pancrustacea
- Class: Insecta
- Order: Trichoptera
- Family: Limnephilidae
- Genus: Limnephilus
- Species: L. sericeus

Binomial name
- Limnephilus sericeus (Say, 1824)

Synonyms
- Anabolia decepta Banks, 1899; Goniotaulius despectus (Walker, 1852); Limnephilus deceptus (Banks, 1899); Limnephilus despectus Walker, 1852; Limnephilus eminens Betten, 1934; Limnephilus multifarius Walker, 1852; Limnephilus perforatus Walker, 1852; Phryganea sericea Say, 1824

Species of caddisfly

Limnephilus sericeus is a species of northern caddisfly in the family Limnephilidae. It is found in North America and Europe.
