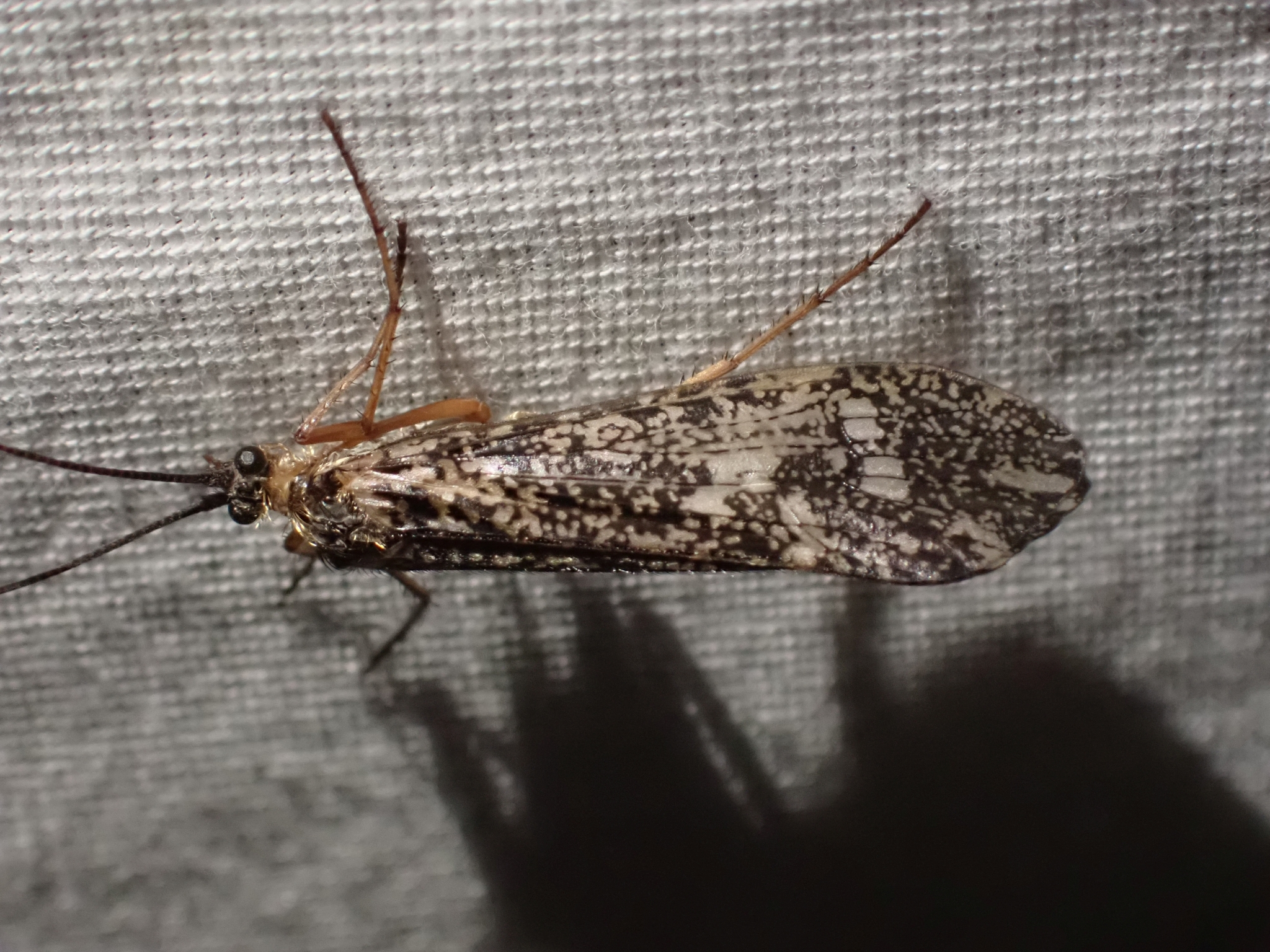

Scientific classification
- Kingdom: Animalia
- Phylum: Arthropoda
- Clade: Pancrustacea
- Class: Insecta
- Order: Trichoptera
- Family: Limnephilidae
- Subfamily: Limnephilinae
- Tribe: Limnephilini
- Genus: Clistoronia; Banks, 1916

Subgenera
- Clistoronia (Clistoronia) Banks, 1916; Clistoronia (Clistoroniella) Schmid, 1955

= Clistoronia =

Genus of caddisflies

Clistoronia is a genus of northern caddisflies in the family Limnephilidae. There are about five described species in Clistoronia.

== Species ==
These five species belong to the genus Clistoronia:

- Clistoronia flavicollis (Banks, 1900)
- Clistoronia formosa (Banks, 1900)
- Clistoronia graniculata (Denning, 1966)
- Clistoronia maculata (Banks, 1904)
- Clistoronia magnifica (Banks, 1899)
