= Asynarchus =

Scientific classification
- Kingdom: Animalia
- Phylum: Arthropoda
- Clade: Pancrustacea
- Class: Insecta
- Order: Trichoptera
- Family: Limnephilidae
- Subfamily: Limnephilinae
- Tribe: Limnephilini
- Genus: Asynarchus; McLachlan, 1880

Genus of caddisflies

Asynarchus is a genus of insects belonging to the family Limnephilidae.

The genus was first described by McLachlan in 1880.

The species of this genus are found in Eurasia and Northern America.

Species:

- Asynarchus contumax McLachlan, 1880
