= Limnephilus parvulus =

Scientific classification
- Kingdom: Animalia
- Phylum: Arthropoda
- Clade: Pancrustacea
- Class: Insecta
- Order: Trichoptera
- Family: Limnephilidae
- Tribe: Limnephilini
- Genus: Limnephilus
- Species: L. parvulus

Binomial name
- Limnephilus parvulus (Banks, 1905)

Synonyms
- Limnephilus roberti Banks, 1930; Stenophylax parvulus Banks, 1905

Species of caddisfly

Limnephilus parvulus is a species of northern caddisfly in the family Limnephilidae. It is found in North America.
