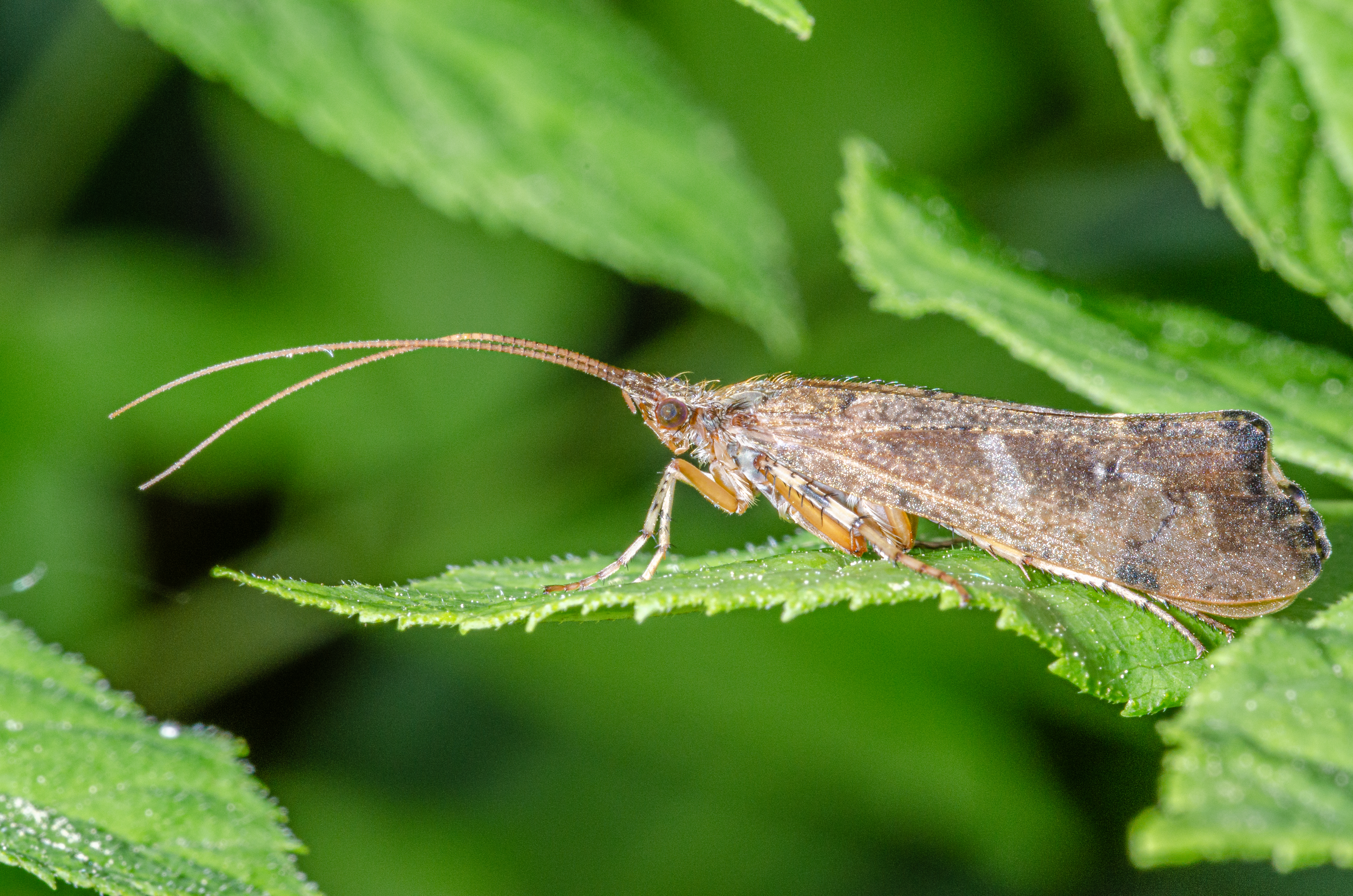

Scientific classification
- Kingdom: Animalia
- Phylum: Arthropoda
- Clade: Pancrustacea
- Class: Insecta
- Order: Trichoptera
- Family: Limnephilidae
- Genus: Glyphotaelius
- Species: G. pellucidus

Binomial name
- Glyphotaelius pellucidus (Retzius, 1783)

= Glyphotaelius pellucidus =

Species of caddisfly

Glyphotaelius pellucidus is a species of insect belonging to the family Limnephilidae.

It is native to Europe and Northern America.
