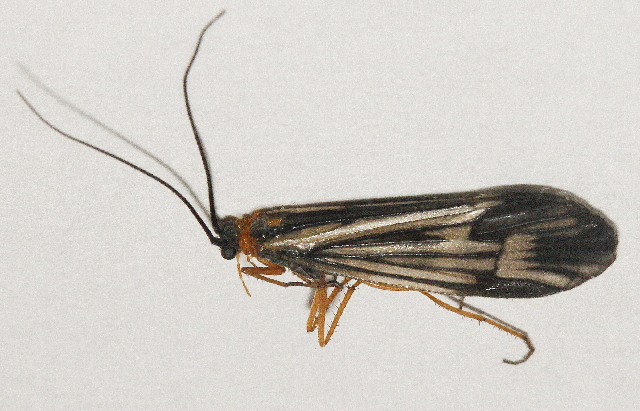

Scientific classification
- Kingdom: Animalia
- Phylum: Arthropoda
- Clade: Pancrustacea
- Class: Insecta
- Order: Trichoptera
- Family: Limnephilidae
- Tribe: Limnephilini
- Genus: Halesochila; Banks, 1907
- Species: H. taylori

Binomial name
- Halesochila taylori (Banks, 1904)

= Halesochila =

Genus of caddisflies

Halesochila is a genus of northern caddisflies in the family Limnephilidae. There is one described species in Halesochila, H. taylori.
