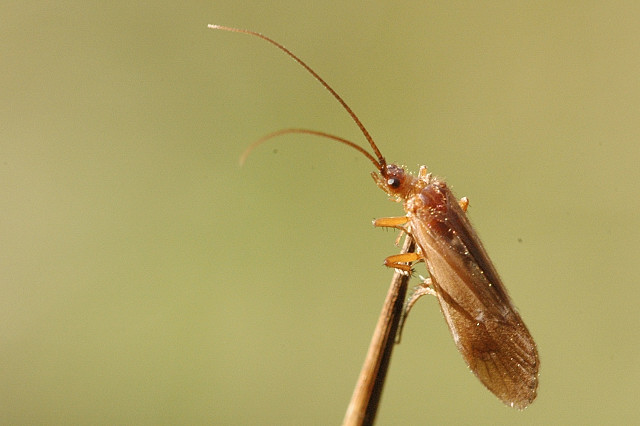
- Chaetopteryx

Scientific classification
- Kingdom: Animalia
- Phylum: Arthropoda
- Clade: Pancrustacea
- Class: Insecta
- Order: Trichoptera
- Family: Limnephilidae
- Subfamily: Limnephilinae
- Tribe: Chaetopterygini
- Genus: Chaetopteryx; Stephens, 1829

= Chaetopteryx =

Genus of caddisflies

Chaetopteryx is a genus of insects belonging to the family Limnephilidae.

The genus was first described by Stephens in 1829.

== Species ==
The known species of this genus are found in Europe.

- Chaetopteryx villosa (Fabricius, 1798)
