= Pseudostenophylacinae =

Scientific classification
- Kingdom: Animalia
- Phylum: Arthropoda
- Clade: Pancrustacea
- Class: Insecta
- Order: Trichoptera
- Family: Limnephilidae
- Subfamily: Pseudostenophylacinae; Schmid, 1955

Subfamily of caddisflies

Pseudostenophylacinae is a subfamily of caddisfly.

== Genera ==
- Aplatyphylax
- Astenophylina
- Astratodina
- Phylostenax
- Pseudostenophylax
