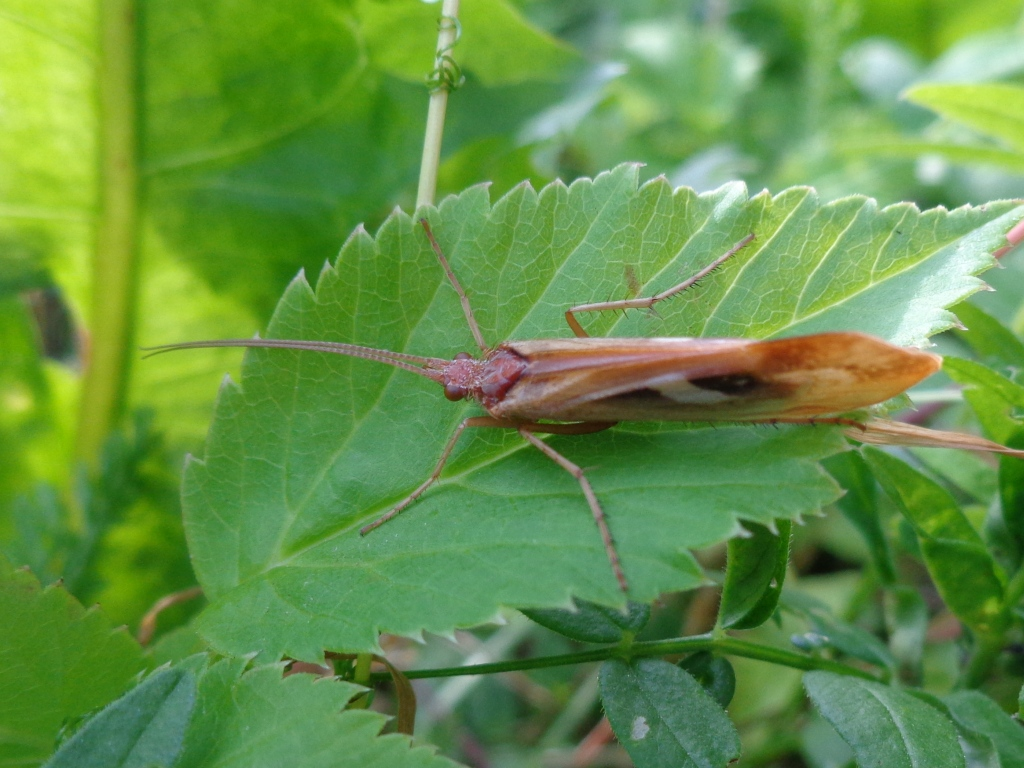

Scientific classification
- Kingdom: Animalia
- Phylum: Arthropoda
- Clade: Pancrustacea
- Class: Insecta
- Order: Trichoptera
- Family: Limnephilidae
- Genus: Limnephilus
- Species: L. rhombicus

Binomial name
- Limnephilus rhombicus (Linnaeus, 1758)

Synonyms
- Limnephilus combinatus Walker, 1852; Phryganea rhombica Linnaeus, 1758

= Limnephilus rhombicus =

Species of caddisfly

Limnephilus rhombicus is a species of northern caddisfly in the family Limnephilidae. It is found in Europe and northern Asia (excluding China).

ITIS taxonomic note:

- East Palearctic and Nearctic and West Palearctic.

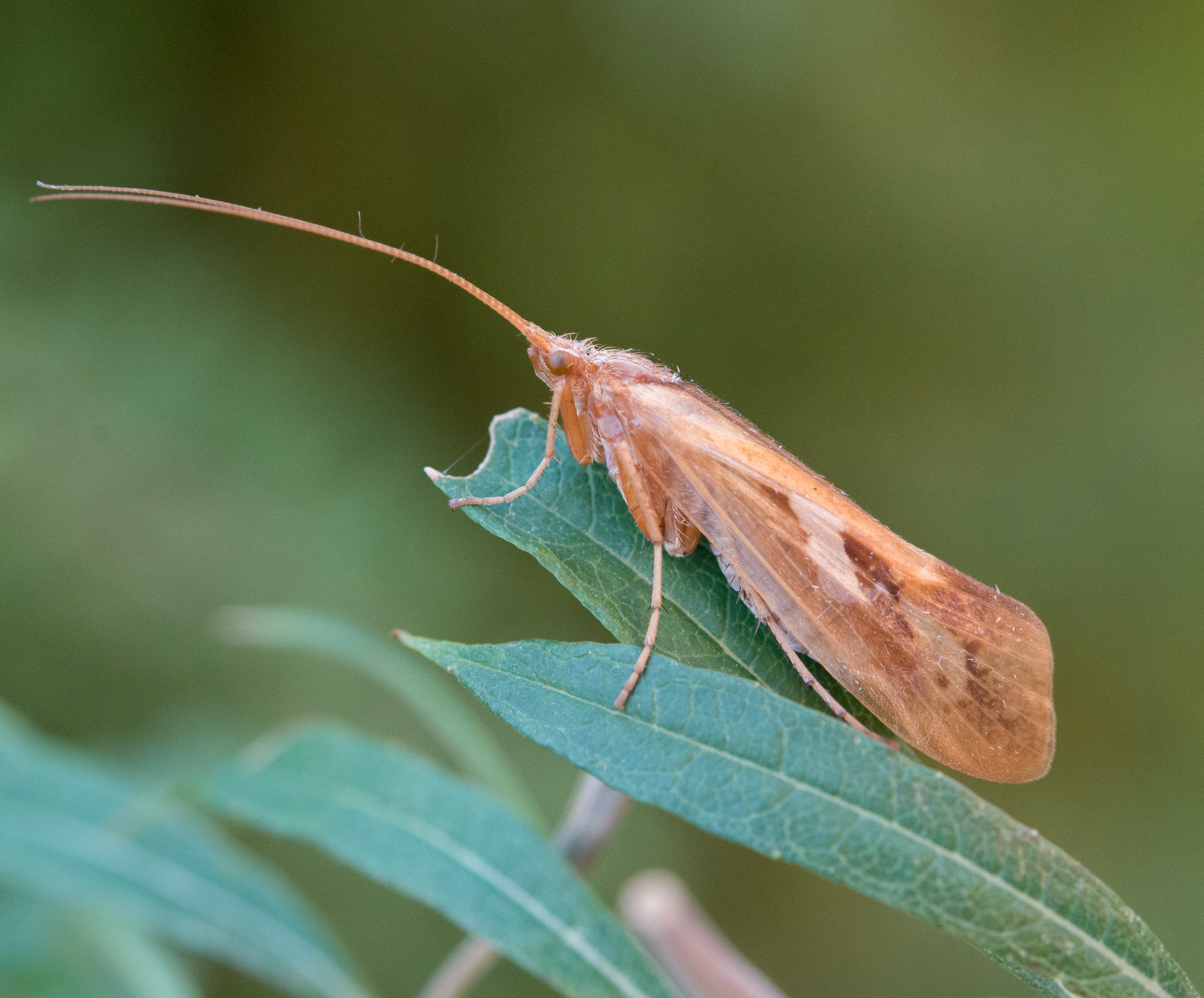

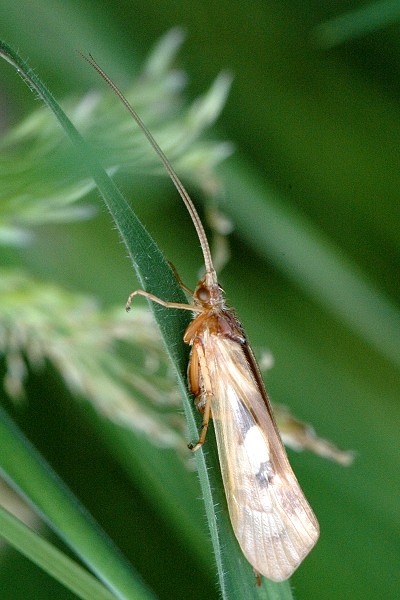

== Subspecies ==
These two subspecies belong to the species Limnephilus rhombicus:

- Limnephilus rhombicus monolobatus Martynov, 1910
- Limnephilus rhombicus reseri Malicky, 1985
