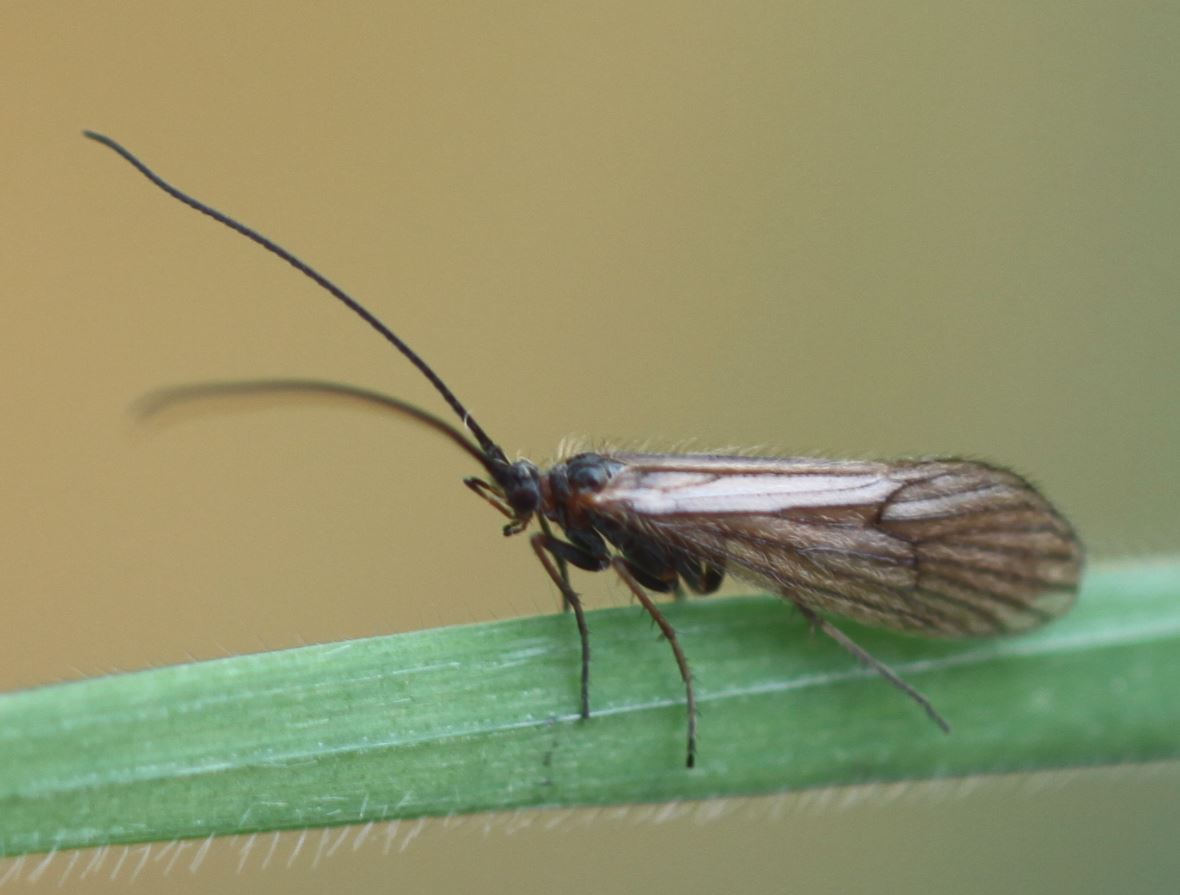

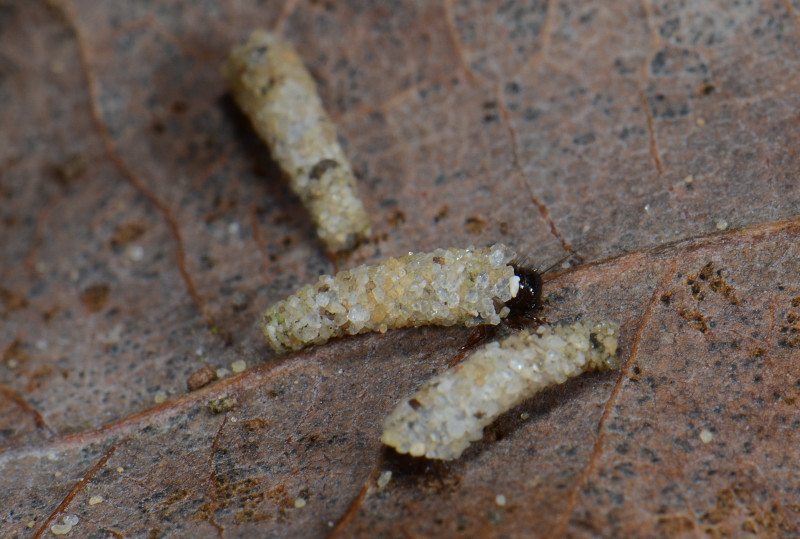
- Enoicyla pusilla larvae

Scientific classification
- Kingdom: Animalia
- Phylum: Arthropoda
- Clade: Pancrustacea
- Class: Insecta
- Order: Trichoptera
- Family: Limnephilidae
- Genus: Enoicyla
- Species: E. pusilla

Binomial name
- Enoicyla pusilla (Burmeister, 1839)

= Enoicyla pusilla =

Species of insect found in Europe

Enoicyla pusilla also known as the land caddis and the terrestrial caddis is a species of caddisfly in the family Limnephilidae. The genus Enoicyla is unique among caddisflies because the larvae are terrestrial, living in leaf litter.

== Distribution ==
Enoicyla pusilla has a widespread but discontinuous distribution in Europe. In Britain, it is found chiefly in and around Wyre Forest, Worcestershire and adjoining counties.

== Biology ==
The females lay eggs shortly after emerging in the autumn and they hatch about two weeks later. There are five larval instars between December and April and fully developed larval cases are about 8–9 mm long and 1.5–2 mm in diameter.
