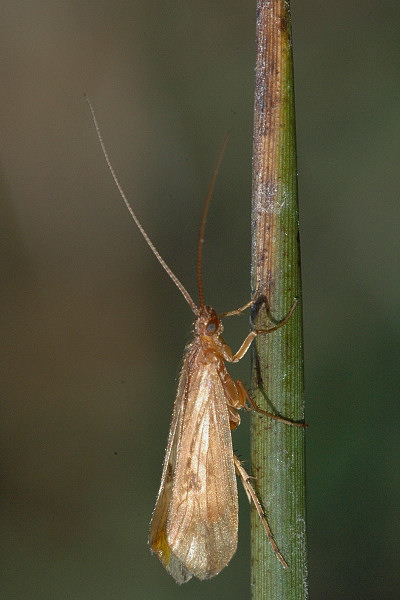

Scientific classification
- Kingdom: Animalia
- Phylum: Arthropoda
- Clade: Pancrustacea
- Class: Insecta
- Order: Trichoptera
- Family: Limnephilidae
- Genus: Limnephilus
- Species: L. flavicornis

Binomial name
- Limnephilus flavicornis Fabricius, 1787

= Limnephilus flavicornis =

Species of caddisfly

Limnephilus flavicornis is a species of caddisfly in the family Limnephilidae. Its larvae, which can be found in lakes, ponds and puddles, creates a case from organic materials as a method of camouflage and protection.

== Gallery ==
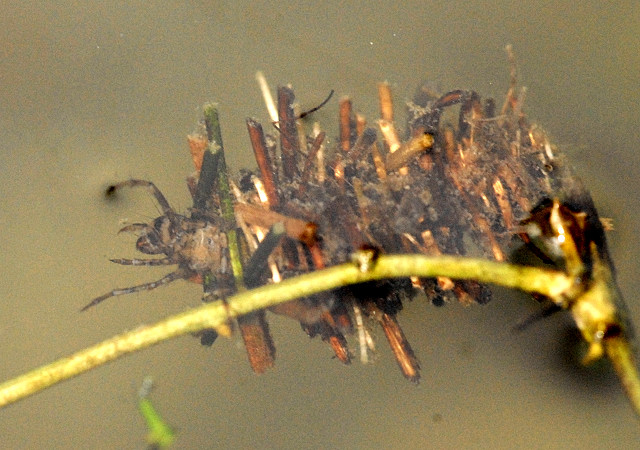
Larva with case from various materials

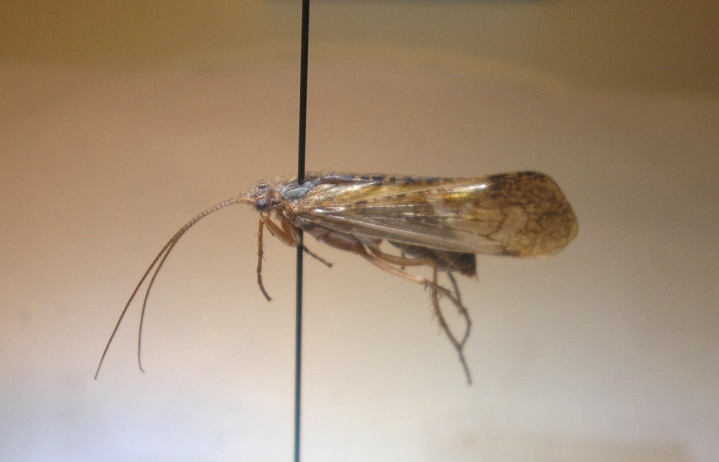
Prepared specimen
