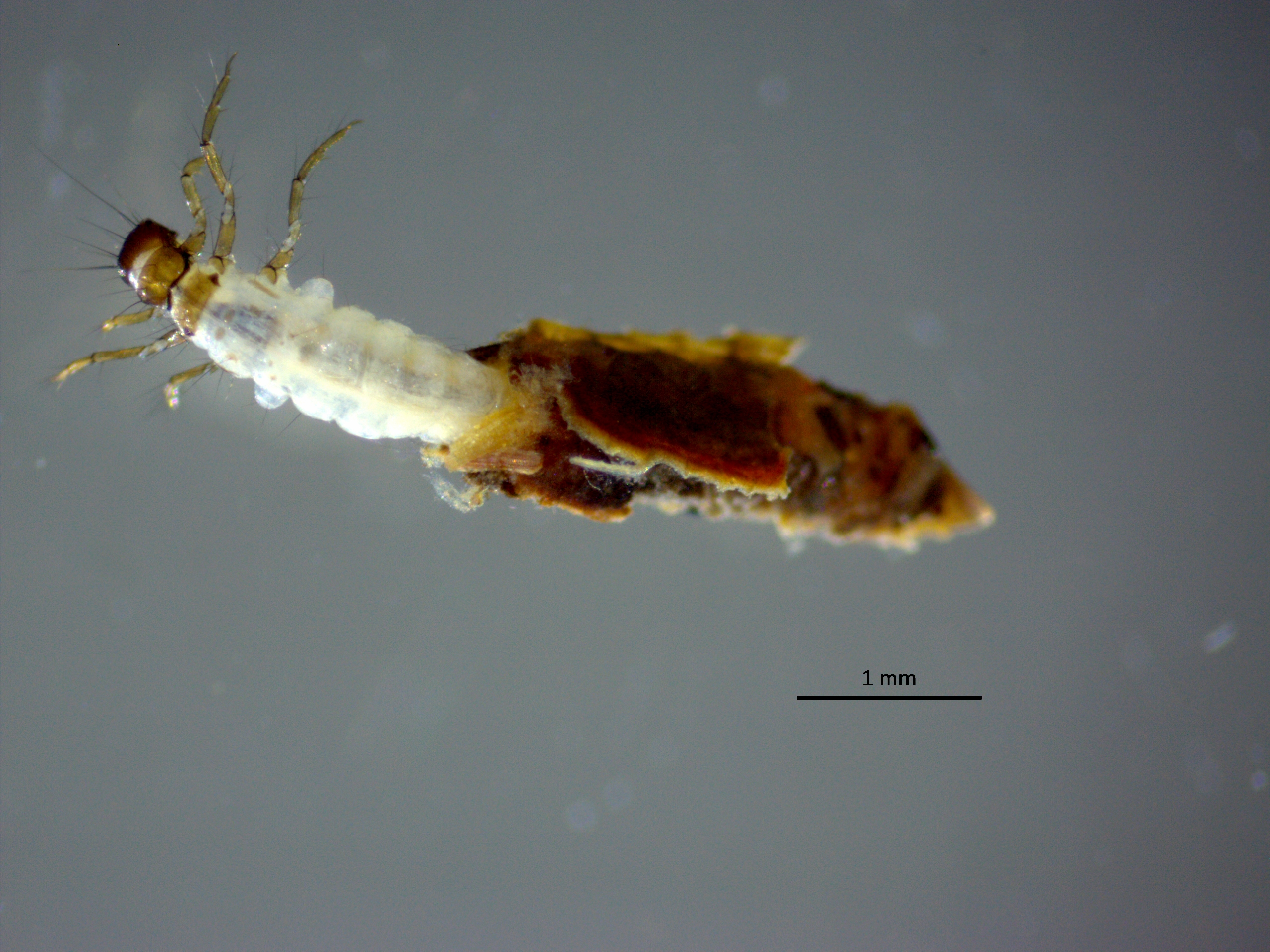

Scientific classification
- Kingdom: Animalia
- Phylum: Arthropoda
- Clade: Pancrustacea
- Class: Insecta
- Order: Trichoptera
- Family: Limnephilidae
- Subfamily: Limnephilinae
- Tribe: Limnephilini
- Genus: Anabolia; Stephens, 1837

Synonyms
- Phacopteryx Kolenati, 1848

= Anabolia =

Genus of caddisflies

Anabolia is a genus of northern caddisflies in the family Limnephilidae. There are about 18 described species in Anabolia.

== Species ==
These 18 species belong to the genus Anabolia:

- Anabolia apora Parker, 1984
- Anabolia appendix (Ulmer, 1905)
- Anabolia bimaculata (Walker, 1852)
- Anabolia brevipennis (Curtis, 1834)
- Anabolia concentrica (Zetterstedt, 1840)
- Anabolia consocia (Walker, 1852)
- Anabolia furcata Brauer, 1857
- Anabolia kawamurai Iwata, 1927
- Anabolia laevis (Zetterstedt, 1840)
- Anabolia lombarda Ris, 1897
- Anabolia nervosa (Curtis, 1834)
- Anabolia oculata Martynov, 1909
- Anabolia ozburni Milne, 1935
- Anabolia semenovi (Martynov, 1935)
- Anabolia servata (McLachlan, 1880)
- Anabolia sordida Hagen, 1861
- Anabolia soror McLachlan, 1875
- Anabolia subquadrata Martynov, 1930
