= Rhadicoleptus =

Scientific classification
- Kingdom: Animalia
- Phylum: Arthropoda
- Clade: Pancrustacea
- Class: Insecta
- Order: Trichoptera
- Family: Limnephilidae
- Genus: Rhadicoleptus; Wallengren, 1891

Genus of insects

Rhadicoleptus is a genus of insects belonging to the family Limnephilidae.

The species of this genus are found in Europe.

Species:

- Rhadicoleptus alpestris (Kolenati, 1848)
- Rhadicoleptus spinifer (McLachlan, 1875)
- Rhadicoleptus ucenorum (McLachlan, 1876)
