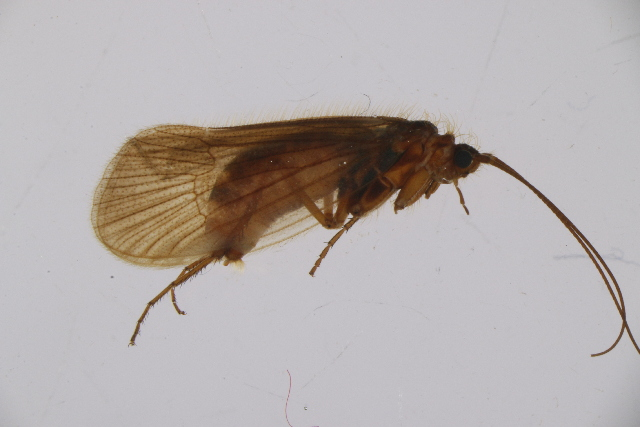
- Annitella esparraguera

Scientific classification
- Kingdom: Animalia
- Phylum: Arthropoda
- Clade: Pancrustacea
- Class: Insecta
- Order: Trichoptera
- Family: Limnephilidae
- Genus: Annitella; Klapálek, 1907

= Annitella =

Genus of caddisflies

Annitella is a genus of caddisflies belonging to the family Limnephilidae. It was introduced by Czech entomologist František Klapálek in 1907 and named for his wife Anně.

The species of this genus are found in Europe.

== Species ==
Species in this genus include:

- Annitella amelia Sipahiler, 1998
- Annitella apfelbecki (Klapálek, 1899)
- Annitella cabeza Sipahiler, 1998
- Annitella chomiacensis (Dziedzielewicz, 1908)
- Annitella dziedzielewiczi Schmid, 1952
- Annitella esparraguera (Schmid, 1952)
- Annitella iglesiasi Gonzalez & Malicky, 1988
- Annitella kosciuszkii Klapalek, 1907
- Annitella lalomba Sipahiler, 1998
- Annitella lateroproducta (Botosaneanu, 1952)
- Annitella obscurata (McLachlan, 1876)
- Annitella pyrenaea (Navás, 1930)
- Annitella sanabriensis (Gonzalez & Otero, 1985)
- Annitella thuringica (Ulmer, 1909)
- Annitella transylvanica Murgoci, 1957
- Annitella triloba Marinkovic-Gospodnetic, 1957
