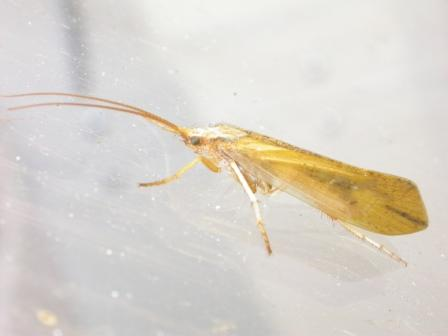
- Grammotaulius nigropunctatus

Scientific classification
- Kingdom: Animalia
- Phylum: Arthropoda
- Clade: Pancrustacea
- Class: Insecta
- Order: Trichoptera
- Family: Limnephilidae
- Genus: Grammotaulius; Kolenati, 1848

= Grammotaulius =

Genus of insects

Grammotaulius is a genus of caddisflies belonging to the family Limnephilidae.

The species of this genus are found in Europe and Northern America.

Species:

- Grammotaulius alascensis Schmid, 1964
- Grammotaulius bettenii Hill-Griffin, 1912
