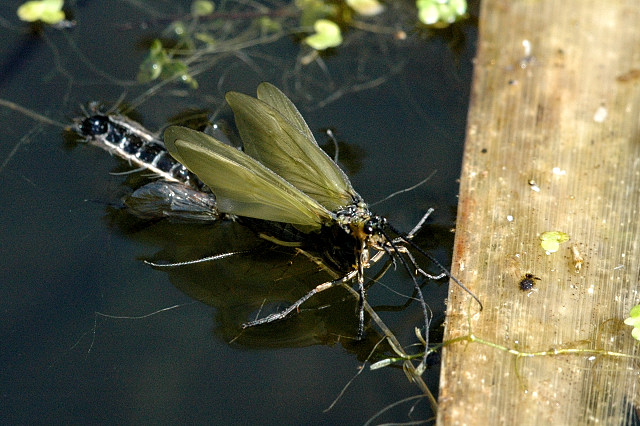
- Parachiona picicornis emerging

Scientific classification
- Kingdom: Animalia
- Phylum: Arthropoda
- Clade: Pancrustacea
- Class: Insecta
- Order: Trichoptera
- Family: Limnephilidae
- Genus: Parachiona; Thomson, 1891

= Parachiona =

Genus of insects

Parachiona is a genus of insects belonging to the family Limnephilidae.

The species of this genus are found in Europe.

Species:

- Parachiona picicornis (Pictet, 1834)
