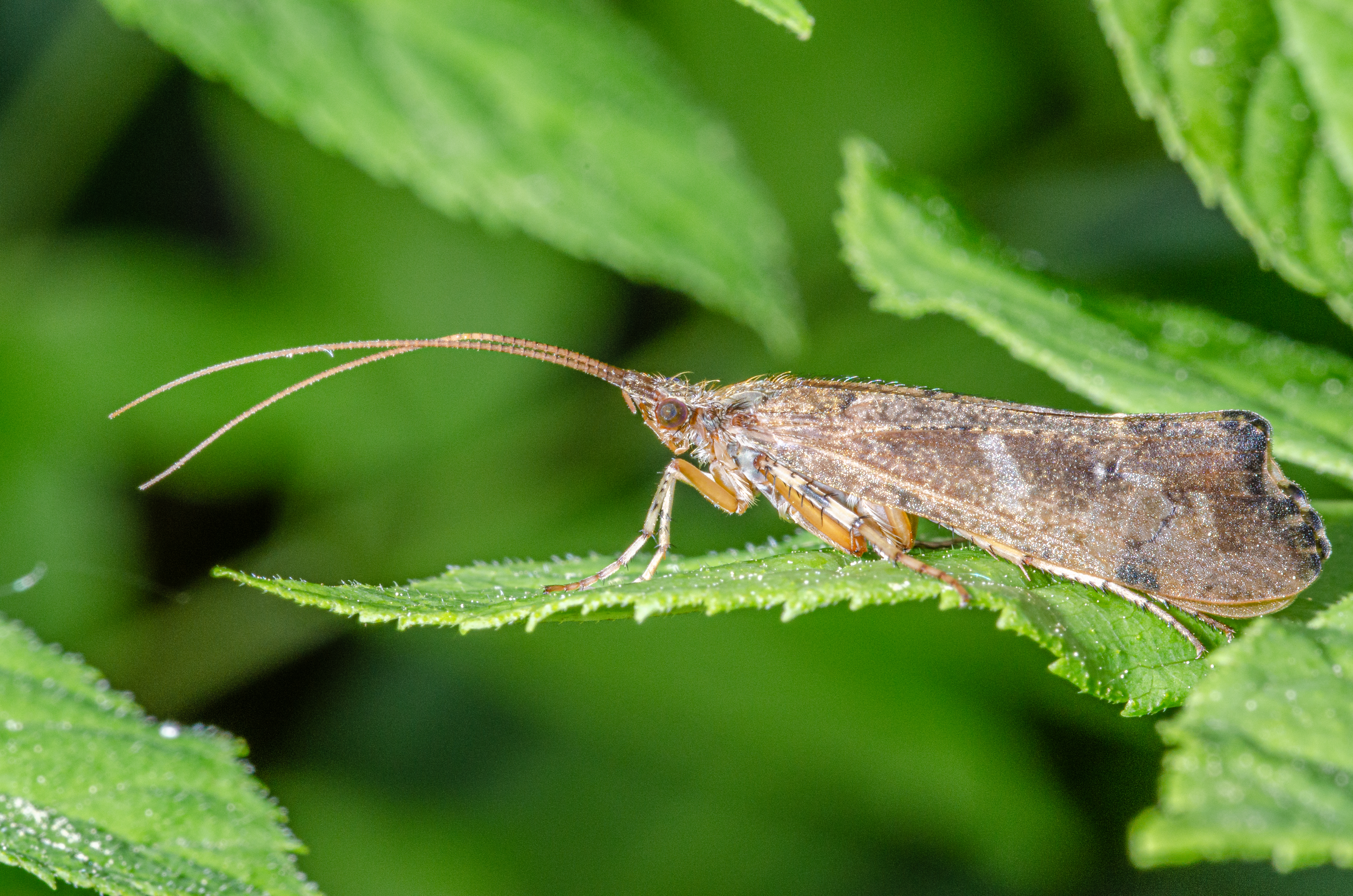
- Glyphotaelius pellucidus

Scientific classification
- Kingdom: Animalia
- Phylum: Arthropoda
- Clade: Pancrustacea
- Class: Insecta
- Order: Trichoptera
- Family: Limnephilidae
- Genus: Glyphotaelius; Stephens, 1833

= Glyphotaelius =

Genus of caddisflies

Glyphotaelius is a genus of caddisfly belonging to the family Limnephilidae.

The genus was first described by Stephens in 1833.

The species of this genus are found in Eurasia and Northern America.

== Species ==
The Global Biodiversity Information Facility includes:

1. Glyphotaelius pellucidus (Retzius, 1783)
2. Glyphotaelius persicus McLachlan, 1874
3. Glyphotaelius selysii McLachlan, 1869
