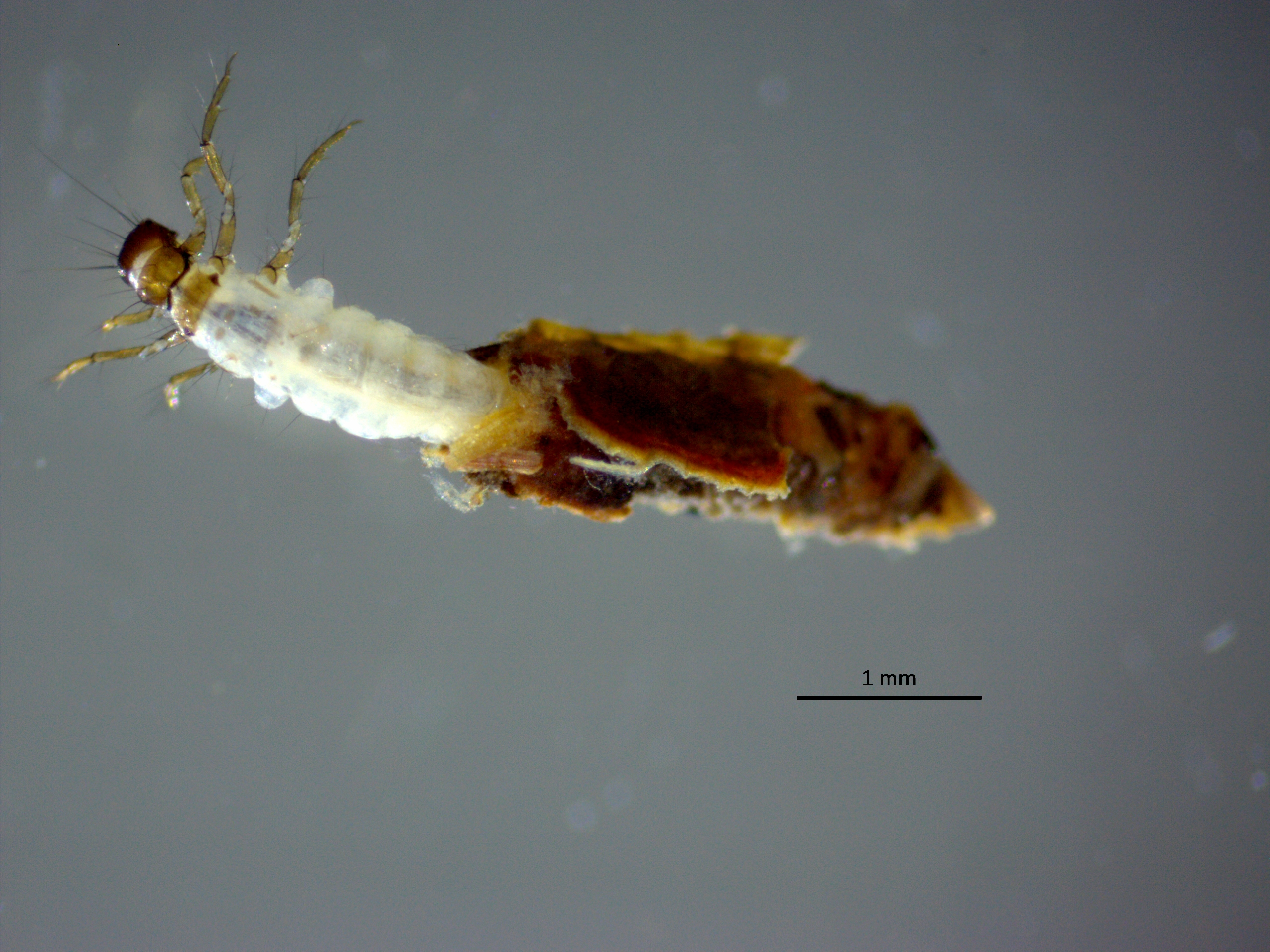
- Anabolia

Scientific classification
- Kingdom: Animalia
- Phylum: Arthropoda
- Clade: Pancrustacea
- Class: Insecta
- Order: Trichoptera
- Family: Limnephilidae
- Subfamily: Limnephilinae
- Tribe: Limnephilini; Kolenati, 1848

= Limnephilini =

Tribe of caddisflies

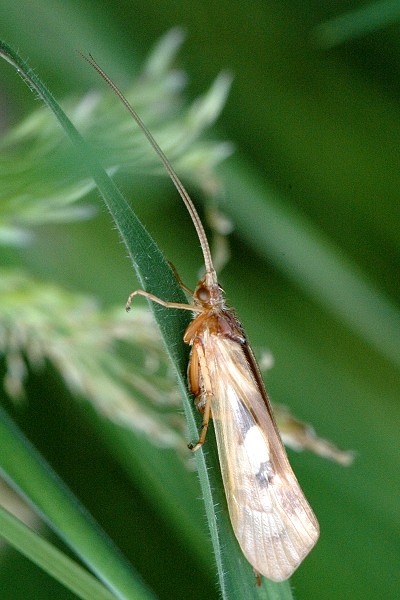
Limnephilus rhombicus

Limnephilini is a tribe of northern caddisflies in the family Limnephilidae. There are about 16 genera and at least 300 described species in Limnephilini.

The type genus for Limnephilini is Limnephilus Leach, 1815.

== Genera ==
These 19 genera belong to the tribe Limnephilini:

- Anabolia Stephens, 1837
- Anisogamodes Martynov, 1924
- Arctopora Thomson, 1891
- Asynarchus McLachlan, 1880
- Clistoronia Banks, 1916
- Glyphotaelius Stephens, 1833
- Grammotaulius Kolenati, 1848
- Halesochila Banks, 1907
- Hesperophylax Banks, 1916
- Lenarchus Martynov, 1914
- Lepnevaina Wiggins, 1987
- Leptophylax Banks, 1900
- Limnephilus Leach, 1815
- Nemotaulius Banks, 1906
- Philarctus McLachlan, 1880
- Platycentropus Ulmer, 1905
- Psychoronia Banks, 1916
- Rhadicoleptus Wallengren, 1891
- Rivulophilus Nishimoto, Nozaki, & Ruiter, 2001
