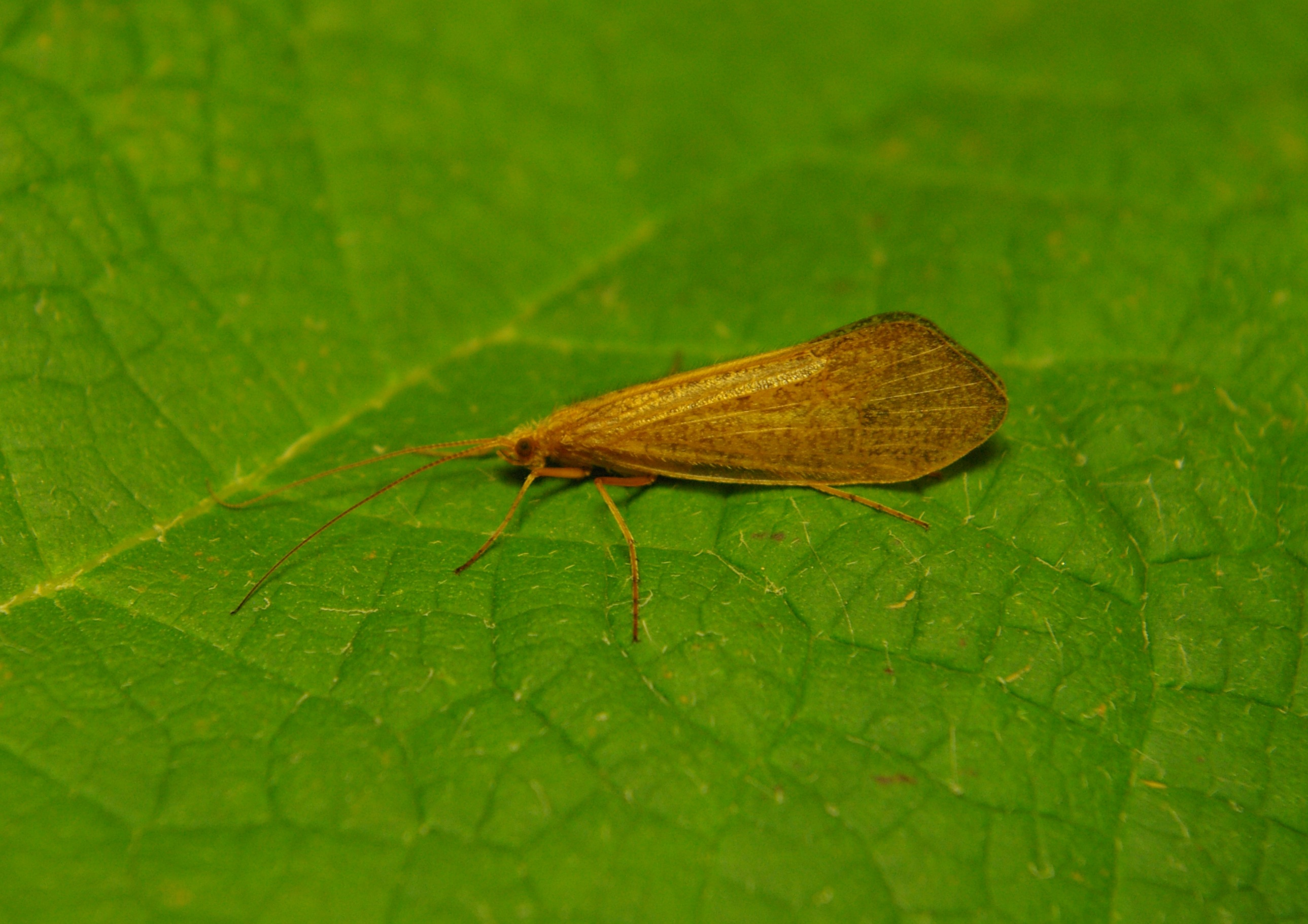
- Glyphopsyche sequatchie

Scientific classification
- Kingdom: Animalia
- Phylum: Arthropoda
- Clade: Pancrustacea
- Class: Insecta
- Order: Trichoptera
- Superfamily: Limnephiloidea
- Family: Limnephilidae; Kolenati, 1848

Subfamilies
- Dicosmoecinae; Drusinae; Limnephilinae; Pseudostenophylacinae and see text

= Limnephilidae =

Family of caddisflies

Limnephilidae is a family of caddisflies with about 100 genera and almost 900 described species. They belong to the main lineage of case-constructing caddisflies, the Integripalpia or tube-case caddisflies. The Limnephilidae is one of the most species-rich Trichoptera families of northern temperate regions, but only a few are known from tropical areas and the Southern Hemisphere. For this reason they are often known as northern caddisflies.

== Description and ecology ==
The adults are usually brown in colour, often with narrow mottled or patterned forewings and much broader, transparent hindwings. The aquatic larvae construct portable cases from a wide variety of plant and mineral materials, sometimes even snail shells. Cases of young larvae often look completely different from those of larger instars. The general trend in the family is that larvae in cool running waters use mineral material for their cases, while those in warmer lentic habitats use plant material. Larvae tend to be eruciform (with a thickset head and thorax), rather slow-moving, and usually feed by browsing algae or scavenging animal remains. They pupate within the larval case, the pupa swimming to the surface before flying away as an adult. For most species the life cycle is completed within one year.

This is arguably the most ecologically diverse caddisfly family, as larvae occupy the full range of freshwater habitats, including lakes, streams, marshes, and temporary pools. The family includes one extraordinary aberrant genus, Enoicyla, whose larvae are terrestrial, living among moss and leaf litter on the woodland floor. In Britain, Enoicyla pusilla is found chiefly in and around Wyre Forest, Worcestershire and neighbouring counties. The females of Enoicyla have only vestigial wings and are flightless.

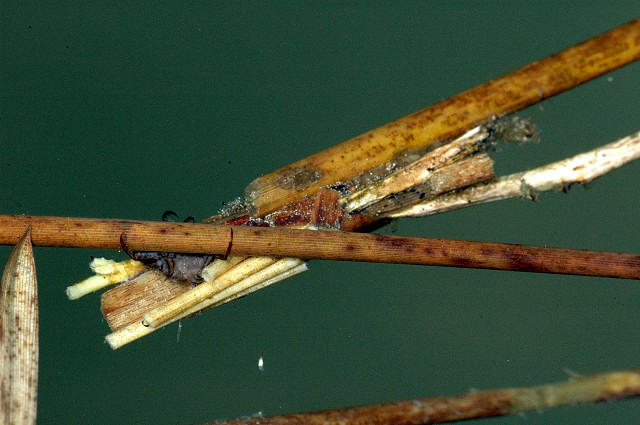
Larval case of Anabolia nervosa

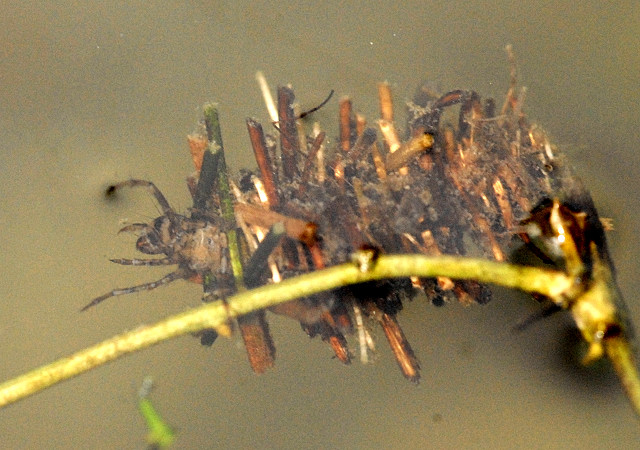
Larval case of Limnephilus flavicornis

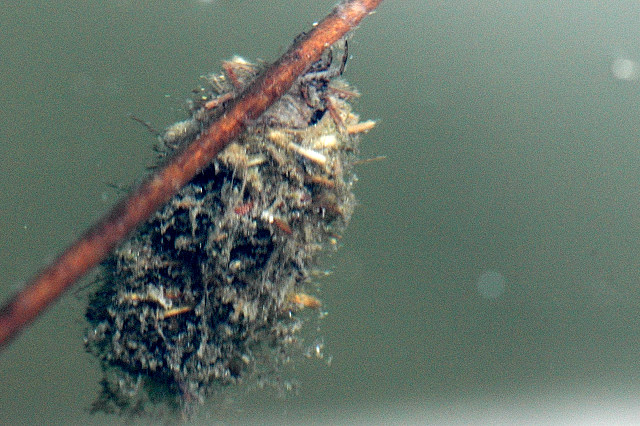
Larval case of Limnephilus stigma

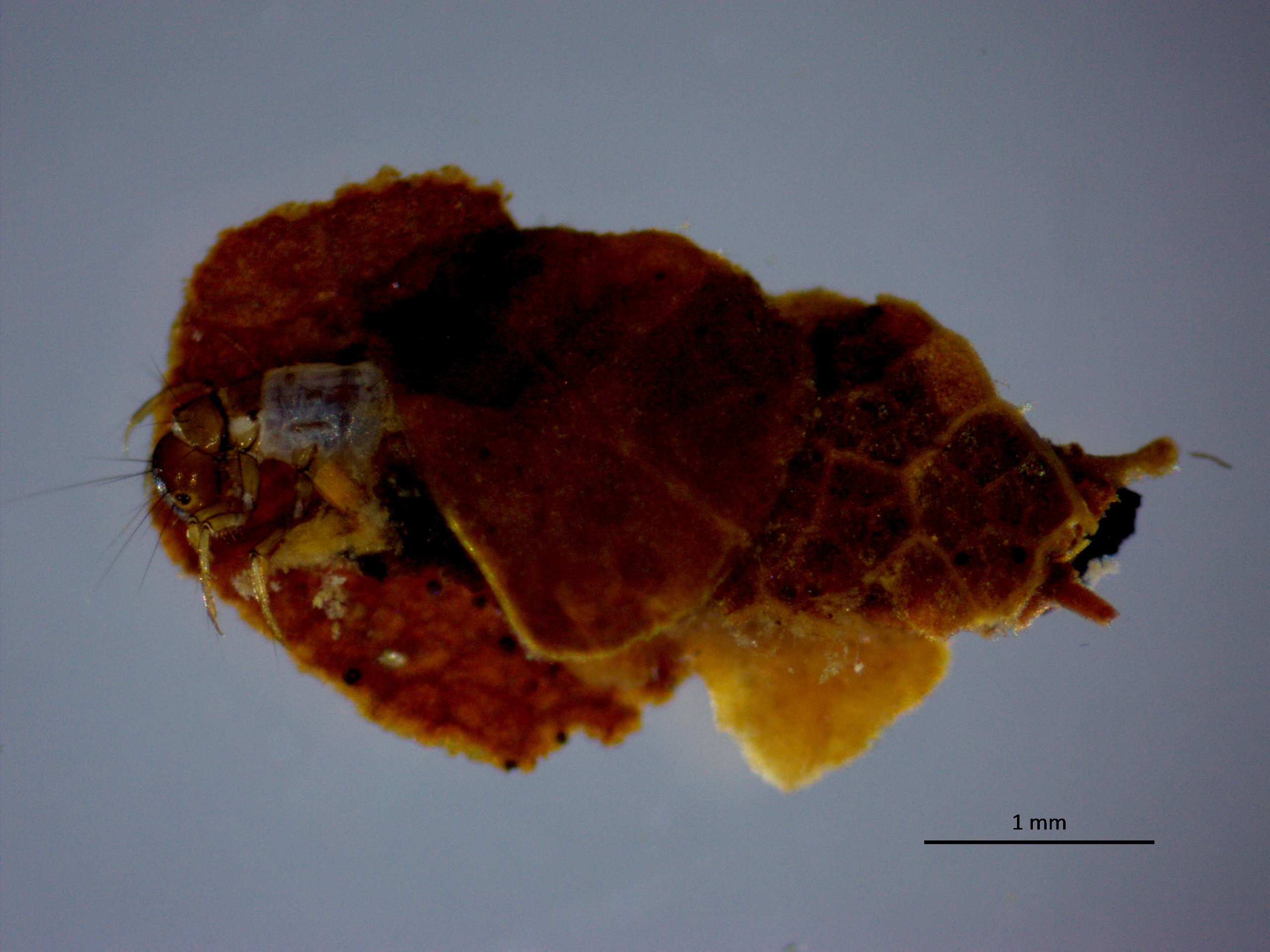
Larval case of Glyphotaelius pellucidus

== Systematics ==
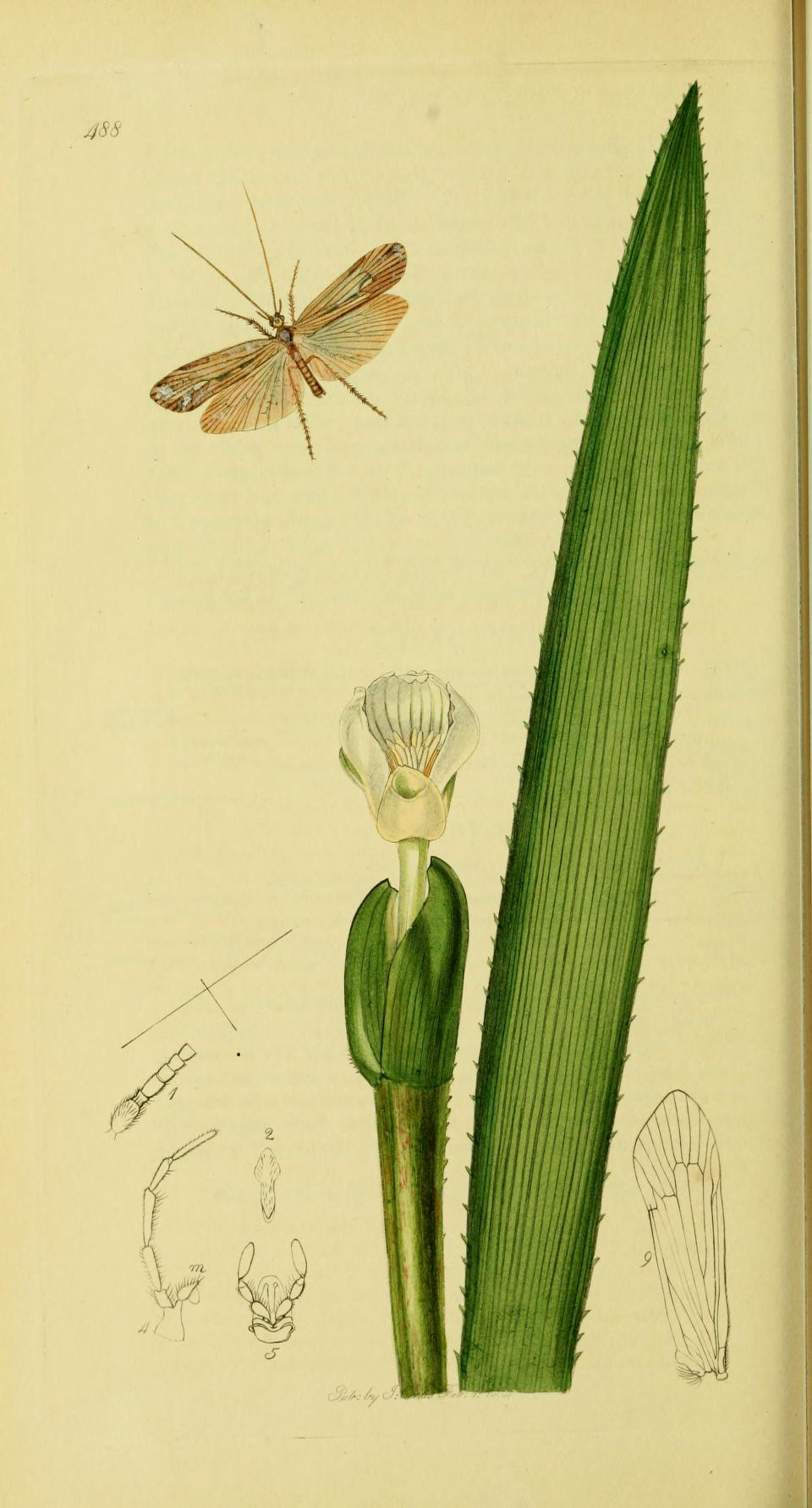
"Limnephilus elegans the Elegant Grannom", from British Entomology by John Curtis, c. 1840

The monophyly of Limnephilidae is supported by multiple independent genes, including nuclear rRNA and mitochondrial COI, as well as combined molecular and morphological data.

The Limnephilidae are divided among the four subfamilies listed here (with some notable genera also given). A few genera are not presently assignable to subfamily.

- Dicosmoecinae
  - Ironoquia
- Drusinae
  - Drusus
- Limnephilinae
  - Anabolia
  - Chaetopteryx
  - Enoicyla
  - Glyphotaelius
  - Limnephilus
  - Parachiona
  - Chilostigma
- Pseudostenophylacinae
  - Aplatyphylax
  - Astenophylina
  - Astratodina
  - Phylostenax
  - Pseudostenophylax
- Incertae sedis
  - Allomyia
  - Manophylax
  - Moselyana
  - Pedomoecus
