= List of Albanian inventions and discoveries =

Albanian inventions and discoveries are objects, processes or techniques invented, innovated or discovered, partially or entirely, by Albanians or individuals of Albanian descent.

Invention/discovery	Inventor/discoverer	Field	Notes
Developed the Shqipe C-15, an unmanned aerial vehicle (UAV) described by the Canadian Institute of Technology as the first Albanian drone developed at CIT.	Canadian Institute of Technology researchers, engineers and students	Aerospace engineering, Unmanned aerial vehicles	The Shqipe C-15 is an unmanned aerial vehicle developed at the Canadian Institute of Technology (CIT) in Tirana, Albania. The project was developed through collaboration among CIT researchers, engineers and students and was presented in June 2026 during the 6th International Conference on Transforming Industries and Societies through AI-Enabled Information Systems (ICITTBT 2026).
Led a research team at ETH Zurich and University Hospital of Zurich in developing an innovative heart-regenerating patch called the RCPatch (Reinforced Cardiac Patch).	Omer Xhemali	Surgery, Regenerative medicine and Tissue engineering	A team led by Prof. Omer Xhemali at ETH Zurich and University Hospital of Zurich has developed a novel Reinforced Cardiac Patch (RCPatch). This innovation represents a major step forward in heart tissue regeneration following heart attacks or structural cardiac damage.
Contributed to the invention and optimization of wearable biomechanical energy harvesters that convert human motion into electrical energy, advancing self-powered wearable technology.	Klevis Ylli	Electrical engineering, MEMS and Energy harvesting	Klevis Ylli graduated with a B.Sc. in Electrical Engineering from Karlsruhe Institute of Technology and earned an M.Sc. in MicroElectroMechanical Systems from the University of Southampton. He specialized in designing and modeling inductive energy harvesters for converting human motion into electrical power during his time at the Hahn-Schickard Institute. His notable paper on this topic received a most-cited award in Smart Materials and Structures. He completed his Ph.D. on human motion energy harvesting at the University of Freiburg in 2019. Currently, he works as a project manager focused on industrial sensor development at Endress+Hauser.
Herbal Pharmacopoeia of Northern Albania developed a detailed herbal treatment system based on endemic plants like Sideritis (mountain tea) and Origanum vulgare. Research from the 2000s has validated some of these treatments for their anti-inflammatory and antimicrobial properties.	Northern Albanians	Traditional Medicine and Ethnobotany	
Discovered Nitric Oxide's role in relaxing blood vessels, transforming heart disease, erectile dysfunction, and aiding premature infants breathing struggles. Murad's discovery contributed to the invention of Viagra as well.	Ferid Murad	Pharmacologist and Biochemistry	Ferid Murad won the Nobel Prize in Physiology or Medicine in 1998 for his independent study of the metabolic pathway of nitric oxide in smooth muscle vasodilation. Alongside Robert F. Furchgott, and Louis Ignarro.
Discovered a novel process governing the clustering of gold atoms on crystal surfaces.	Afërdita Veveçka Priftaj	Physicist	Priftaj's discovery of the mechanism governing gold atom clustering on crystal surfaces is highly significant, offering critical insights for catalysis, nanotechnology, and material science.
Pioneering research on the effects of dietary mercury and arsenic on humans and the ecosystem's health.	Carol Folt	Biological Sciences	Dr. Folt's pioneering scientific investigations significantly influenced national and global policies while prompting advisories on consumption, particularly in relation to human health and ecosystem well-being impacted by dietary factors.
Pioneering role in the research and development of methods for utilizing ethanol as an alternative engine fuel.	Savo Gjirja	Engineer and Research engineer	
Actively Participated in the Apollo Space Program and Contributed to the Apollo 11 Mission. Kokalari helped design the Apollo 11 spacecraft, had a crucial key role as the final tester of the system, and wrote the 2-year-long testing project engineering report.	Wilson Kokalari	Astronautics and Aerospace engineering	Wilson Kokalari was honored by having his name included on a plaque carried to the Moon by the Apollo 11 astronauts, commemorating everyone who was behind this historic achievement.
Discovered a main belt asteroid, 2020 SS13 and 2000 EK140 = 1998 YE31 to be officially named by the International Astronomical Union 45687 Pranverahyseni to recognize her efforts in astronomy outreach.	Pranvera Hyseni	Astronomy, Earth science and Planetary science	Pranvera Hyseni is a Ph.D. candidate in Earth and Planetary Sciences at UC Santa Cruz and the founder of Astronomy Outreach of Kosovo (AOK), the largest astronomy outreach program in Eastern Europe. She has been instrumental in establishing the National Observatory and Planetarium of Kosovo, which features a 50-seat planetarium equipped with advanced telescopes, funded through collaborative efforts and donations. Hyseni has received multiple awards for her contributions to science education and outreach. Her work has significantly impacted scientific literacy in Kosovo, engaging over 25,000 individuals annually through AOK's initiatives.
Invented the "Gjota generators and electromotors" Gjota worked on the discovery of the electric motor with more advanced properties than the current one. Which saves electricity significantly and the amount of copper needed for construction. In 2005 Gjota published a book about his findings "Complementary-Complex Electric Machines".	Rifat Gjota	Electrical Engineering and Teacher	In 1965 Gjota graduated from the Electrotechnical Faculty of the University of Skopje. Then completed his master's degree at the Faculty of Electrical Engineering at the University of Zagreb, and obtained his doctorate at the Faculty of Electrical Engineering of the University of Pristina. He then worked as a professor at the University of Pristina.
Invented and developed Tungsten Filament Lights for Color photography at MIT. Mili discovered further innovations in Stroboscopic and Stop-action images through his work.	Gjon Mili	Electrical engineering, Photography and Cinematography	Mili collaborated with various artists and performers, including Pablo Picasso, Henri Matisse, Igor Stravinsky, and Duke Ellington, capturing their work and performances in innovative ways through his photography and film.
As the founder and CEO of Thinking Machines Lab, Murati is leading the development of cutting-edge AI technologies, focusing on creating customizable, multimodal AI systems that collaborate with users. This new innovation seeks to make AI more accessible and adaptable, bridging gaps between advanced AI capabilities and real-world applications, enabling broader customization to meet diverse needs.	Mira Murati	Mechanical engineering, Computer science and Artificial intelligence.	Murati pursued computer science at the University of Tirana graduating with honors. After completing her undergraduate studies, she moved to the United States and enrolled as an engineering student at Dartmouth College, where she built a hybrid race car. She was the former CEO of OpenAI, where she played a key role in developing AI systems like ChatGPT, DALL-E, and Codex. She oversaw their evolution, guiding research to improve AI's functionality and accessibility. Murati's leadership focused on advancing AI technologies and shaping future directions in machine learning and human-AI collaboration.
Mersini is a proponent and is pioneering for the multiverse hypothesis, proposing that our universe is chosen by quantum gravitational dynamics, positing anomalies as gravitational pulls from other universes. Her theory on the universe's origin suggests our universe is one among many, selected through quantum gravitational interactions of matter and energy.	Laura Mersini-Houghton	Cosmology, Theoretical physics and Teacher	Laura Mersini-Houghton has held a distinguished academic career, teaching both graduate and undergraduate Quantum Mechanics courses at the University of North Carolina at Chapel Hill while making groundbreaking contributions to the multiverse hypothesis and proposing theories on the origin of the universe. Her work has been widely recognized and discussed in scientific circles, including through appearances in documentaries and scientific programs.
Invented and developed an armoured military vehicle named "Shota".	Grigor Andoni	Military	The Albanian vehicle structure manufacturer Timak has completed designing and assembling the country's first armored military vehicle prototype, an infantry mobility vehicle.
Innovated railway design as the designer and creator of the Semmering railway. Which was the first mountain railway in Europe built with a standard gauge track. Referred to commonly as the world's first true mountain railway.	Karl Ritter von Ghega	Civil engineering and Architect	Ghega received the title of (Ritter) for his exceptional contributions to the country and was made the chief of planning for the whole railway network of the Austrian Empire.
Innovated bridge building by designing the Real Ferdinando Bridge over the River Garigliano, completed in 1832. This bridge was the first iron catenary suspension bridge built in Italy and one of the earliest in continental Europe It was technologically advanced for its age.	Luigi Giura	Civil engineering and Architect	Giura was born in Maschito, an Arbëreshë village in Basilicata. He received his education at the school of the Fathers of St. Joseph Calasanz and later attended the seminary in Melfi before moving to Naples to pursue engineering. Giura's innovative use of iron in bridge construction allowed for greater spans and enhanced durability compared to traditional materials. By implementing the catenary principle, he significantly advanced the engineering practices of his time, influencing the design of future bridges in Europe and demonstrating the potential of iron as a primary construction material. His work set new standards for structural design, safety, and functionality in civil engineering.
Major pioneering research on the Ichthyology of Albania	Sabiha Kasimati	Biologist and Ichthyologist	Sabiha Kasimati made major contributions to the field of Ichthyology. Thanks to her comprehensive research documented in "Fishes of Albania," where she systematically cataloged and analyzed 257 species of fish, providing valuable insights into the ichthyofauna of Albanian lakes, rivers, and seas. Even till today, her work remains a very significant resource for understanding the Ichthyology and the diverse aquatic life in the region.
Invented the Wheat Variety named “Dajti”.	Mentor Përmeti	Agronomist	Përmeti earned prestigious accolades such as the Republic Award for his agricultural innovation, the Grand Master of Work medal, and recognition as a Citizen of Honor by the city of Përmet.
Discovered Epimedium alpinum subsp. albanicum	Lulzim Shuka, Kit Tan and Besnik Hallaçi	Botanical	A newly discovered subspecies of Epimedium alpinum, named Epimedium alpinum subsp. albanicum, has been identified in Kosovo's Albanian Alps. Found in serpentine substrates, this unique plant grows in hilly areas, displaying its presence mainly in subalpine zones, and requires conservation attention due to its limited distribution and potential threats from mining activities and overgrazing.
Discovered Potamophylax qafshtamaensis	Halil Ibrahimi and Astrit Bilalli	Zoology	Potamophylax qafshtamaensis is a species of Caddisfly first discovered in 2021 from specimens collected in Qafështamë National Park in central Albania. The species belongs to the Potamophylax tagas species complex and was identified as distinct based on its morphological characteristics. The species is considered microendemic to Qafështamë National Park in central Albania, meaning it is currently known only from this area.
Discovered Potamophylax coronavirus	Halil Ibrahimi	Zoology	Potamophylax coronavirus is a species of caddisfly in the family Limnephilidae described in 2021 from specimens collected in the Bjeshkët e Nemuna National Park in Kosovo. The species was named during the COVID-19 pandemic period. The species is considered microendemic to Bjeshkët e Nemuna National Park.
Discovered Potamophylax humoinsapiens	Halil Ibrahimi et al.	Zoology	Potamophylax humoinsapiens is a species of caddisfly in the Limnephilidae family described from freshwater habitats in the Sharr Mountains in Kosovo. It was identified in 2023 based on morphological characteristics. The species inhabits cold and fast flowing mountain streams and is considered narrowly endemic to the Sharr mountain range.
Discovered Potamophylax kosovaensis	Halil Ibrahimi et al.	Zoology	Potamophylax kosovaensis is a species of caddisfly in the Limnephilidae family described from spring habitats in the Ibër River Basin within the Kopaonik Mountains of Kosovo. It was first identified in 2023 based on morphological analysis and it belongs to the Potamophylax winneguthi species cluster. It is currently endemic to the spring habitats in the Ibër River Basin in the Kopaonik Mountains of Kosovo.
Discovered Potamophylax idliri	Halil Ibrahimi et al.	Zoology	Potamophylax idliri is a species of caddisfly in the Limnephilidae family described from the Jastrebac Mountains in Serbia. It was identified in 2022 based on morphological as well as molecular analyses and belongs to the Potamophylax winneguthi species cluster.
Discovered Tinodes lumbardhi	Halil Ibrahimi et al.	Zoology	Tinodes lumbardhi is a species of caddisfly from a small tributary of the Lumbardhi i Deçanit River in Bellaja Village within the Bjeshkët e Nemuna Mountains of western Kosovo. The species occurs in a highly impacted freshwater system.
Discovered Rhyacophila siparantum	Halil Ibrahimi et al.	Zoology	Rhyacophila siparantum is a species of caddisfly from a small rheocrene spring in a forested area within the Bjeshkët e Nemuna Mountains of western Kosovo. The species belongs to the R. philopotamoides species group and is endemic to the region.
Discovered Tulipa albanica	Lulzim Shuka, Besnik Hallaçi and L. Vata	Botanical	Tulipa albanica, a newly discovered species from northeastern Albania, boasts vibrant yellow and scarlet flowers, distinct for their absence of a black basal blotch on the perianth segments. This tulip's habitat in serpentine areas alongside rare endemic species adds to its uniqueness and ecological significance in Albania.
Invented the Elbasan alphabet	Gregory of Durrës	Scholar, Printer, Typographer, and Teacher, and an Eastern Orthodox Christian monk and Cleric	
Invented the Todhri alphabet	Theodhor Haxhifilipi	Teacher and Linguist	
Invented the Gjirokastër alphabet	Veso bey	Linguist	
Invented the Vithkuqi alphabet	Naum Veqilharxhi	Lawyer and Scholar	

== See also ==
- List of Albanian inventors and discoverers
