= List of Albanian inventors and discoverers =

This is a list of Albanian inventors and discoverers. The following incomplete list comprises individuals from Albania, the Albanian diaspora, and those of Albanian heritage who have contributed to the invention, innovation, or discovery of objects, processes, or techniques, either wholly or in part while working locally or abroad. The list is arranged in alphabetical order by surname.

== A ==
- Grigor Andoni: Designed and developed Albania's first armored military vehicle, Shota MRAP.

== B ==
- Veso Bey: Invented the Gjirokastër alphabet.

== F ==
- Carol Folt: Pioneering research on the effects of dietary mercury and arsenic on human and ecosystem health. Her pioneering scientific research profoundly influenced national and global policies, leading to important recommendations on consumption, particularly regarding human health and ecosystem well-being, shaped by dietary factors.

== G ==
- Karl Ritter von Ghega: Designed the Semmering railway, the first standard-gauge mountain railway in Europe, commonly known as the world's first true mountain railway. Ghega was awarded the title of (Ritter) in recognition of his exceptional contributions to the country and was appointed as the chief planner for the entire railway network of the Austrian Empire.
- Savo Gjirja: Innovated methods for utilizing ethanol as an alternative engine fuel.
- Rifat Gjota: Invented Gjota generators and electromotors enhancing energy efficiency and reducing usage of copper. In 1965, Gjota graduated from the Electrotechnical Faculty of the University of Skopje. He later completed his master's degree at the University of Zagreb's Faculty of Electrical Engineering and earned his doctorate from the University of Pristina's Faculty of Electrical Engineering. He became a professor at the University of Pristina.
- Luigi Giura: Designed the Real Ferdinando Bridge, the first iron catenary suspension bridge in Italy, it was one of the earliest in continental Europe.

== H ==
- Theodhor Haxhifilipi: Invented the Todhri alphabet.
- Pranvera Hyseni: Discovered a main belt asteroid, 2020 SS13 and 2000 EK140. Officially named by the International Astronomical Union 45687 Pranverahyseni to recognize her efforts in astronomy outreach. She also founded the Astronomy Outreach of Kosovo, advancing astronomical education.

== I ==
- Halil Ibrahimi: Discovered multiple caddisfly species through field collection.

== K ==
- Sabiha Kasimati: Major pioneering research on the Ichthyology of Albania. Sabiha Kasimati made very significant strides in the field of ichthyology through her research and her most notable work Fishes of Albania she cataloged and analyzed 257 fish species. Her contributions continue to serve as a vital reference for the study of the region's ichthyofauna and aquatic biodiversity.
- Wilson Kokalari: Contributed to the Apollo 11 mission, and he played a major role in spacecraft design and testing. Wilson Kokalari was honored by having his name featured on a plaque carried to the Moon by the Apollo 11 astronauts, recognizing the contributions of all those involved in this historic achievement.
- Grigor Konstantinidhi: Invented the Elbasan alphabet.

== M ==
- Laura Mersini-Houghton: Pioneered the multiverse hypothesis, proposing gravitational dynamics among universes.
- Gjon Mili: Innovated stroboscopic and stop action photography as well as invented and developed tungsten filament lights for color photography.
- Ferid Murad: Discovered the role of Nitric Oxide in relaxing blood vessels, a breakthrough that revolutionized treatments for heart disease, erectile dysfunction, and respiratory issues in premature infants. His discovery played an crucial role in the development and creation of Viagra. His discovery earned him a Nobel Prize in 1998 for Physiology or Medicine.
- Mira Murati: Creator and CEO of Thinking Machines Lab and former Chief Technology Officer at OpenAI, she played an important role in developing the AI in ChatGPT, DALL-E, and Codex.

== P ==
- Mentor Përmeti: Invented the Dajti wheat variety which improved agricultural productivity.
- Afërdita Veveçka Priftaj: Discovered the mechanism governing gold atom clustering on crystal surfaces, crucial for advancements in catalysis and nanotechnology.

== S ==
- Lulzim Shuka: Co-discovered Epimedium alpinum subsp. albanicum, a unique plant in Kosovo's Albanian Alps, alongside Kit Tan and Besnik Hallaçi. As well as Co-discovered Tulipa albanica, a distinct tulip species in Albania, alongside Besnik Hallaçi and L. Vata.

== V ==
- Naum Veqilharxhi: Invented the Vithkuqi alphabet.

== X ==
- Omer Xhemali: Led a research team in developing an innovative heart-regenerating patch called the RCPatch (Reinforced Cardiac Patch).

== Y ==
- Klevis Ylli: Contributed to the invention and optimization of wearable biomechanical energy harvesters that convert human motion into electrical energy, advancing self-powered wearable technology.

== See also ==
- List of Albanian inventions and discoveries
