= Potamophylax humoinsapiens =

Scientific classification
- Kingdom: Animalia
- Phylum: Arthropoda
- Class: Insecta
- Order: Trichoptera
- Family: Limnephilidae
- Genus: Potamophylax
- Species: P. humoinsapiens

Binomial name
- Potamophylax humoinsapiens Ibrahimi, Bilalli, and Gashi, 2023

Species of caddisfly

Potamophylax humoinsapiens is a species of caddisfly in the family Limnephilidae. It was first described in 2023, and is morphologically closest to Potamophylax idliri and Potamophylax juliani. The species is microendemic to the Šar Mountains in Kosovo.

== Description ==
The males of the species possess distinctive parameres that are characterized by their elongated and bulbous shape at the base, which gradually narrows down to a thin structure towards the end. The tip of the parameres is adorned with a uniform cluster of thin and elongated spines, resembling tiny hairs. Additionally, the species can be differentiated from its closely related counterparts by the significantly wider gap between the dorsal and ventral edges of the inferior appendages at the apical part, as observed from the side view.

== Habitat ==
The species was discovered at elevations ranging from 1416 to 1505 meters above sea level in three separate locations. Due to its limited range of distribution, much like other members of its species group, it is classified as a microendemic species found exclusively within the Šar Mountains.

== Taxonomy ==
Potamophylax humoinsapiens was described in 2023 by a team of researchers led by Halil Ibrahimi of the University of Pristina.

The name humoinsapiens is a combination of the Latin words humo and insapiens, meaning "to cover with soil, to bury" and "unwise", respectively. The researchers explain that the species' name is ironic, as it sounds like Homo sapiens, and the new species is calling humans unwise for causing the extinction of many insect species and other organisms and degrading known ecosystems on the planet.
