= Potamophylax idliri =

Scientific classification
- Kingdom: Animalia
- Phylum: Arthropoda
- Class: Insecta
- Order: Trichoptera
- Family: Limnephilidae
- Genus: Potamophylax
- Species: P. idliri

Binomial name
- Potamophylax idliri Ibrahimi, Bilalli, and Kuini, 2022

Species of caddisfly

Potamophylax idliri is a species of caddisfly in the family Limnephilidae. It was first described in 2022, and is morphologically closest to Potamophylax coronavirus and Potamophylax juliani. The species is microendemic to the Jastrebac Mountains in Serbia.

== Description ==
The species is most similar in appearance to Potamophylax coronavirus and Potamophylax juliani.

== Habitat ==
The species was discovered at elevations ranging from 891 to 988 meters above sea level in twoseparate locations. Due to its limited range of distribution, much like other members of its species group, it is classified as a microendemic species found exclusively within the Jastrebac Mountains in Serbia.
