= Prishtina Observatory =

Observatory in Pristina, Kosovo

Coordinates: 42°39′42″N 21°09′31″E

- Observatori i Prishtinës
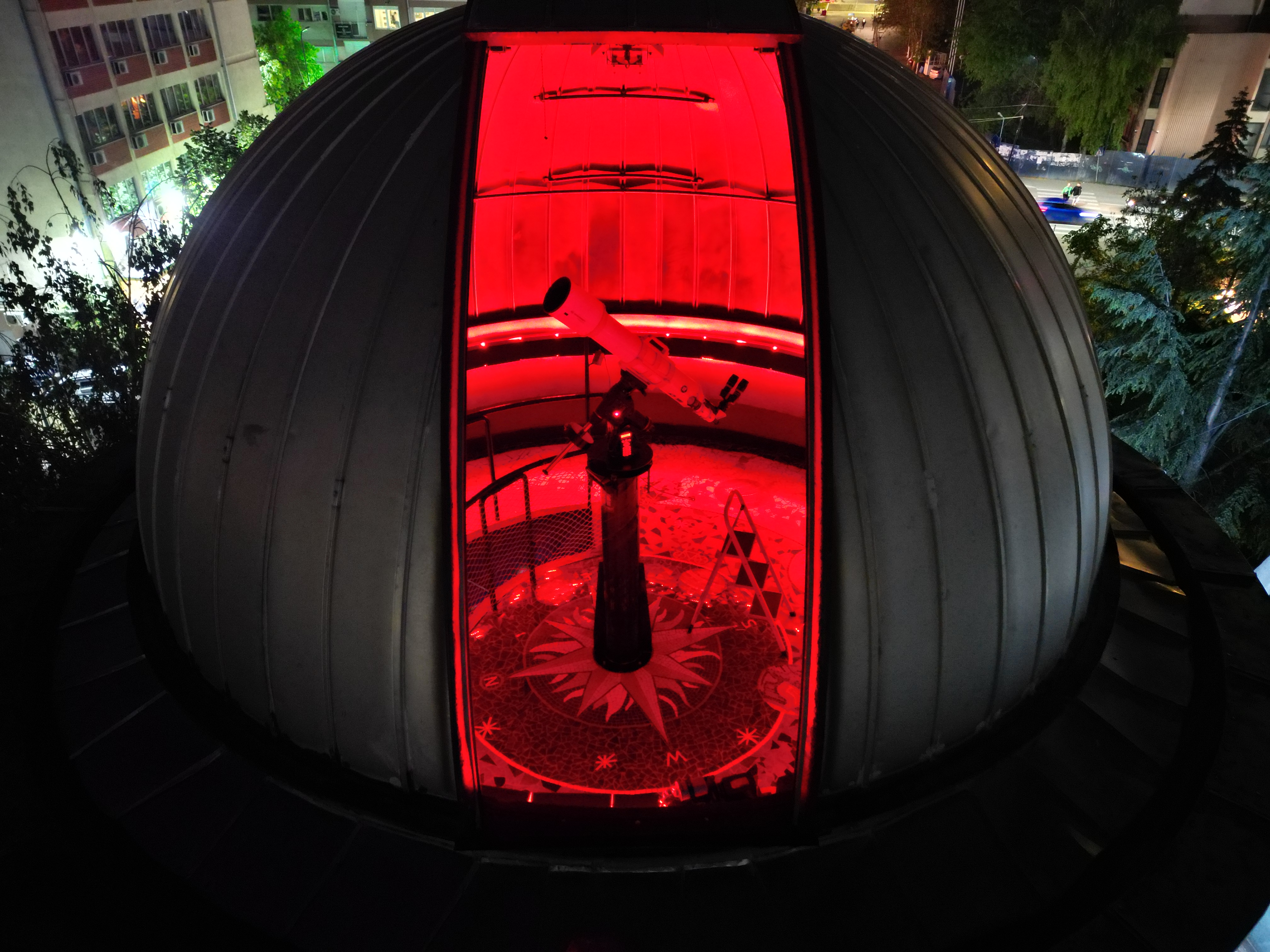
- Prishtina Observatory at night from the sky
- Established: November 1977; 47 years ago
- Location: Palace of Youth and Sports, Pristina, Kosovo
- Type: Observatory

Prishtina Observatory (Albanian: Observatori i Prishtinës) is an observatory in Pristina, Kosovo, that forms part of the Palace of Youth and Sports building complex built in 1977 in dedication to discovery, scientific research and educational practice.

== History ==
It was first opened to the public in mid-November 1977 by a group called the Kosovo Young Researchers. The observatory was used by passionate youngsters and scientific researchers in Former Yugoslavia, part of a cultural shift that brought new opportunities to people, including the scientific community of Kosovo. Its dome-shaped cupola gave the citizens of Prishtina a view of the stars, planets, meteorites and more.

The observatory was not in use for decades, but the space has now been reclaimed by the Astronomy Club of Kosova (ACK). The group initially came together only as lovers of astronomy, with simple tools that each member of the group had in their homes, slowly growing into a more serious group with scheduled meetings for stargazing, discussions about astronomy, and ways that the group can impact the community.

On 13 July 2022 (2 years ago), the observatory re-opened with the support of UNMIK and Pristina Municipality, after a 43-year gap. The observatory opened its doors just a few days after NASA revealed the first five full-color images and spectrographic data from the James Webb Space Telescope.

== Gallery ==
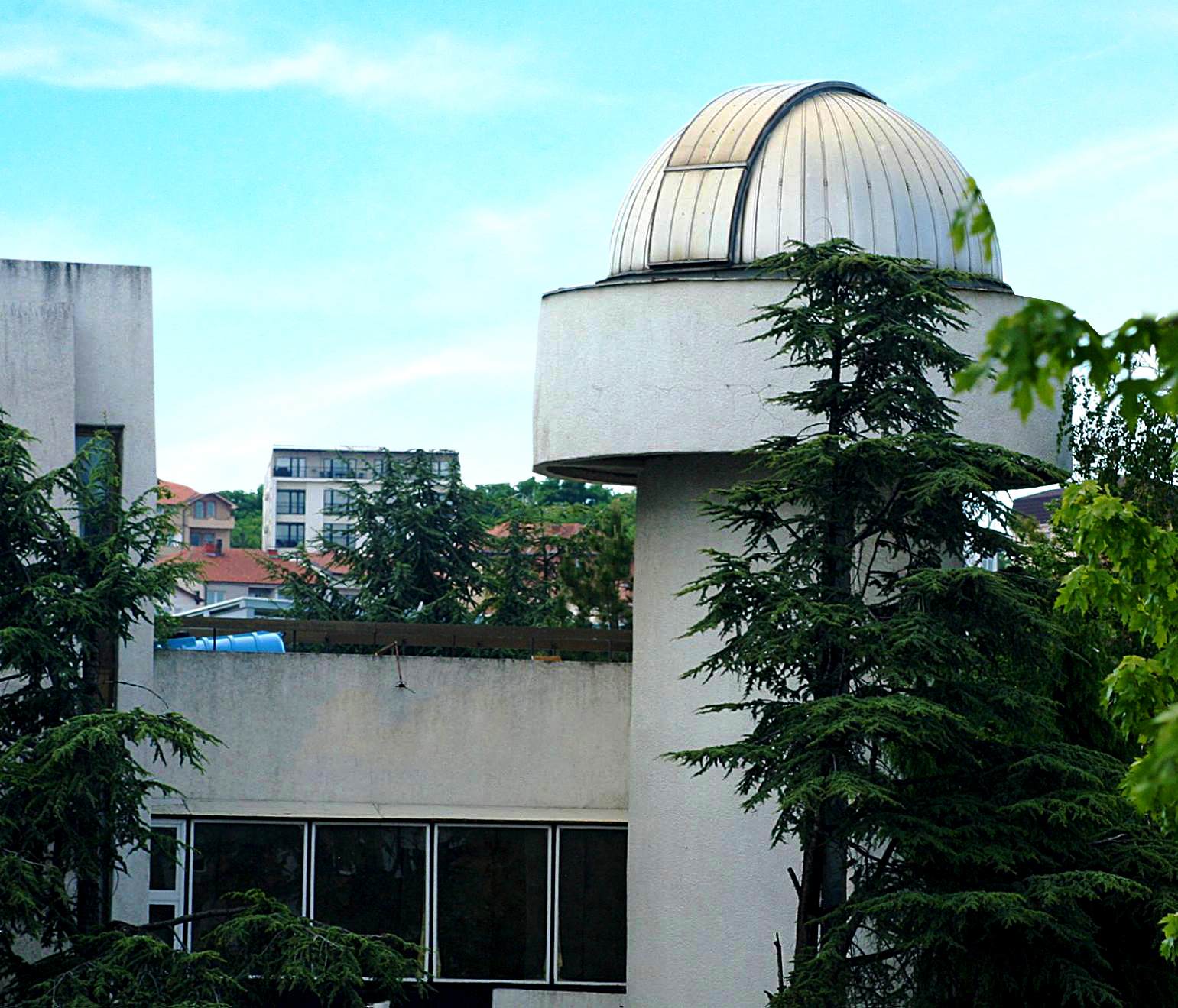

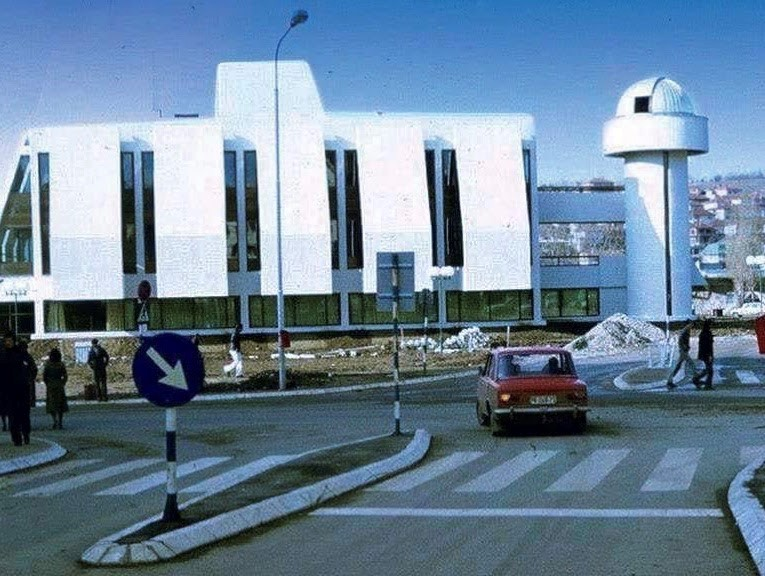

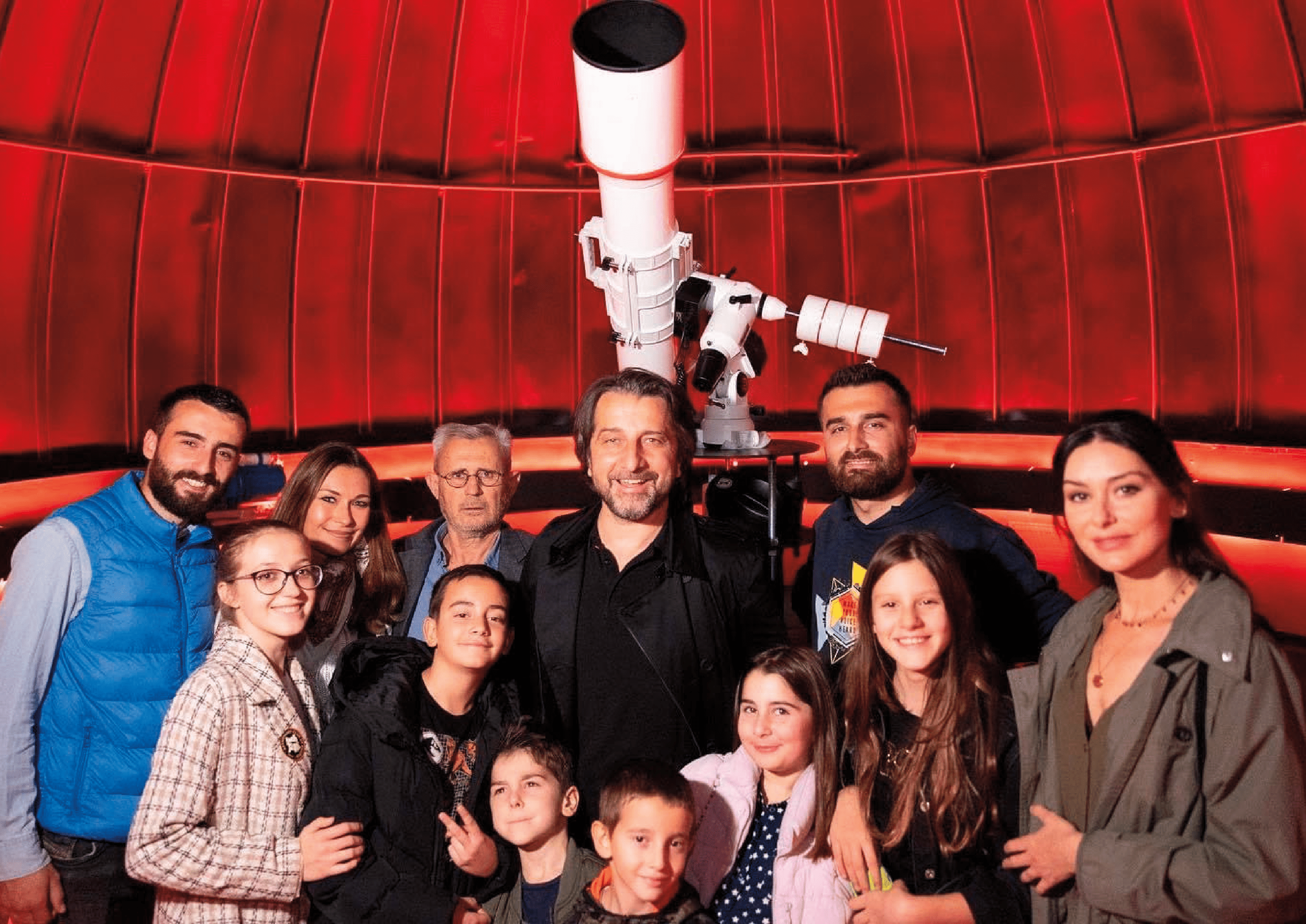

== See also ==
- National Observatory and Planetarium of Kosovo
