= List of species named after the COVID-19 pandemic =

A number of species have been named after the COVID-19 pandemic. The names of the new species may refer to the virus itself, to the pandemic, to the lockdowns, or to something more intricate, such as the name of a person dead from the disease.

== Animals ==
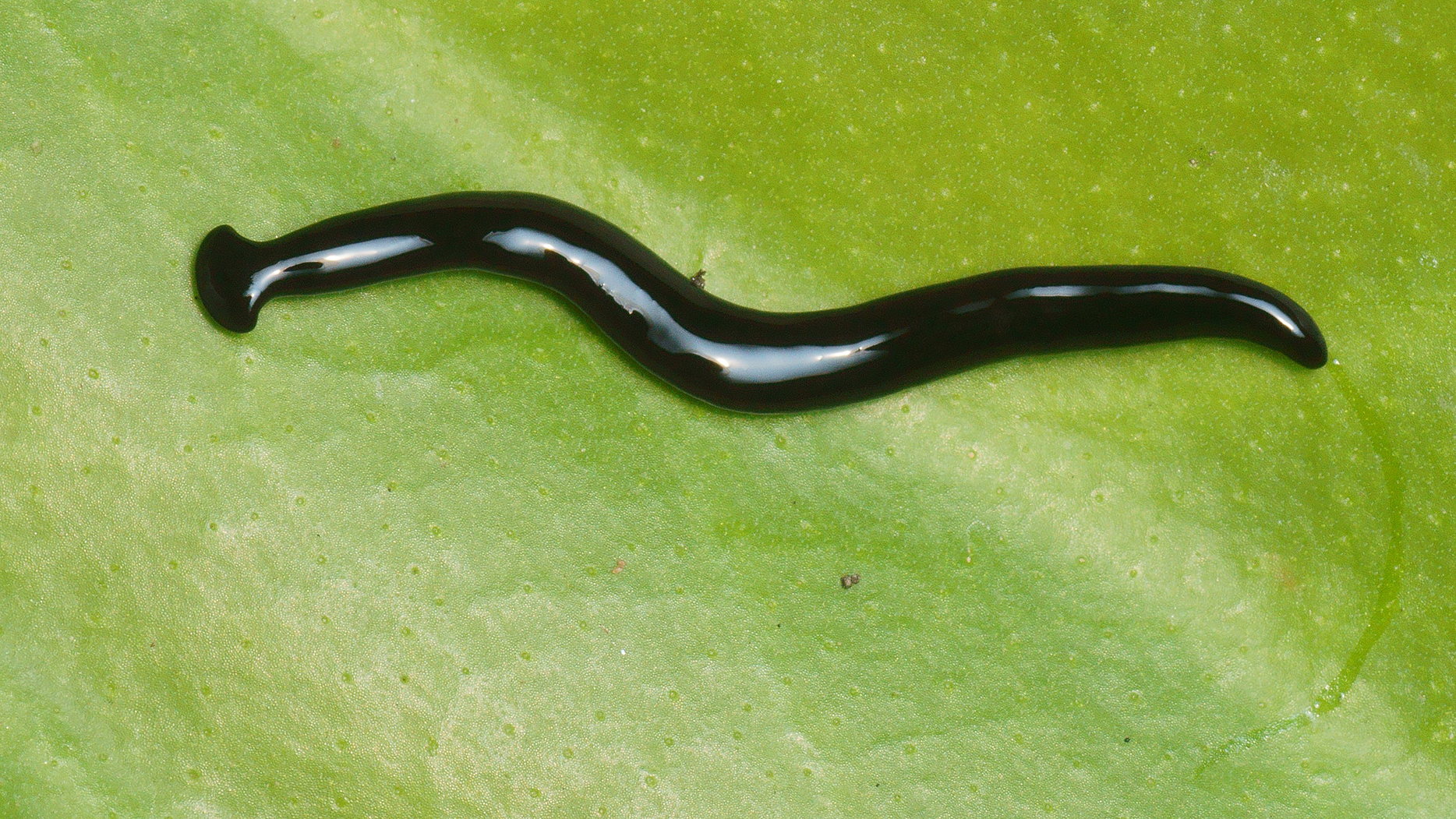
The land flatworm Humbertium covidum

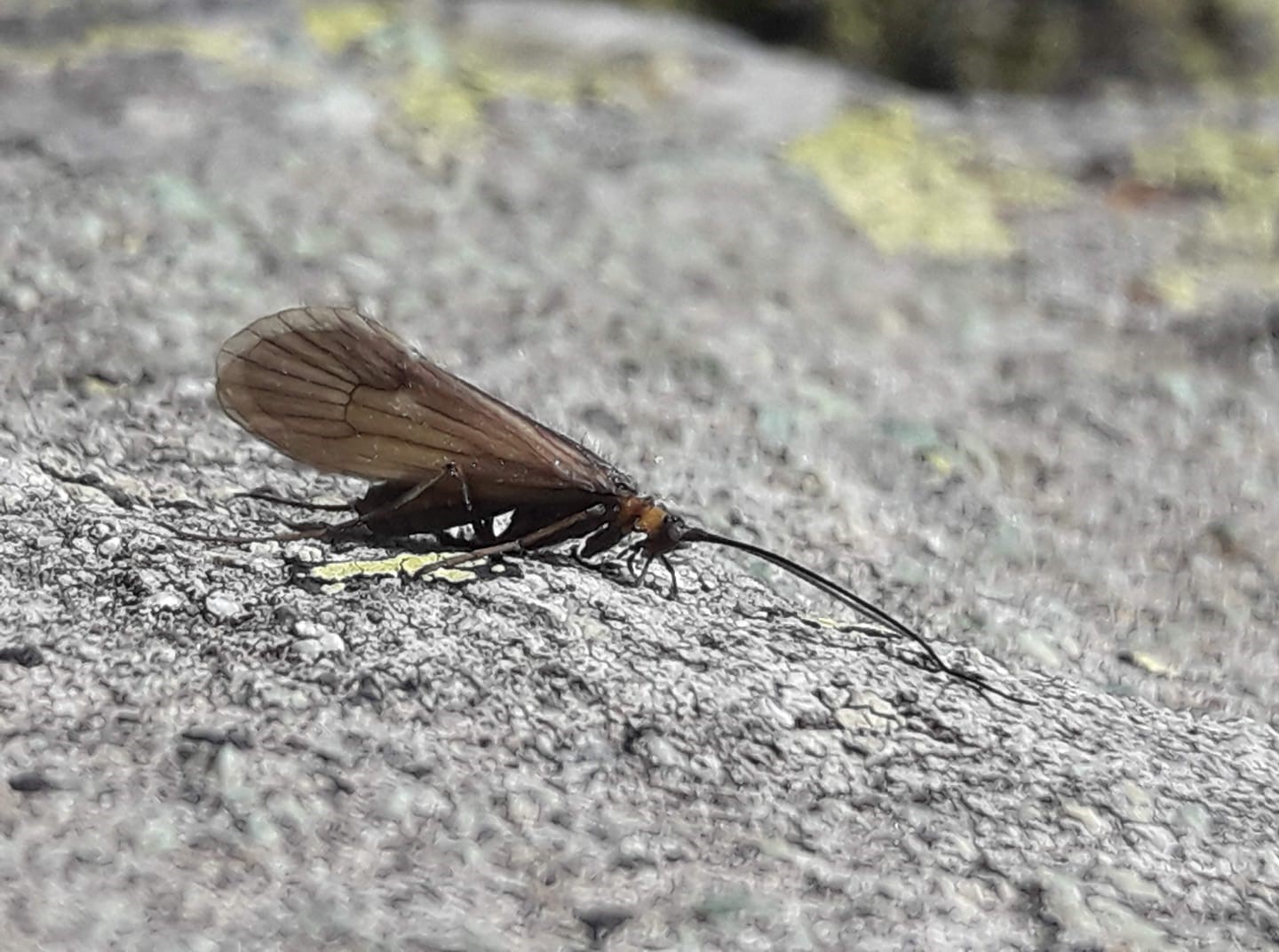
The caddisfly Potamophylax coronavirus

(in alphabetical order of genera)

- Achilia covidia Kurbatov, Cuccodoro & Sabella, 2021 (Insect, Coleoptera, Staphylinidae) – "the epithet of this new species refers to the COVID-19 pandemic and the periods of quarantine during which this study was carried out by the authors".
- Achilia pandemica Kurbatov, Cuccodoro & Sabella, 2021 (Insect, Coleoptera, Staphylinidae) – "the epithet of this new species refers to the COVID-19 pandemic and the periods of quarantine during which this study was carried out by the authors".
- Achilia quarantena Kurbatov, Cuccodoro & Sabella, 2021 (Insect, Coleoptera, Staphylinidae) – "the epithet of this new species refers to the COVID-19 pandemic and the periods of quarantine during which this study was carried out by the authors".
- Allorhogas quarentenus Joele, Zaldívar-Riverón & Penteado-Dias, 2021 (Insect, Hymenoptera, Braconidae) – "The name of this species refers to the COVID-19 pandemics with its subsequent undefined quarantine, which occurred while the authors were describing it".
- Carinadelius medicus Ranjith, van Achterbergan Achterberg, Samartsev & Nasser, 2021 (Insect, Hymenoptera, Braconidae) – "Named after Friedrich Kasimir Medikus (1738 – 1808), a German physician and botanist. We dedicate this species with gratitude to all doctors and nurses for their timeless and uncompromising efforts to control COVID-19".
- Cephalothrips corona Alavi & Minaei, 2021 (Insect, Thysanoptera, Phlaeothripidae) – "This article was prepared during the first author's quarantine period due to his positive test for the Coronavirus diseases".
- Coralliozetus clausus Hastings, 2021 (Fish, Perciformes, Chaenopsidae) – "clausus from the Latin meaning 'enclosed' or 'having been shut off,' in reference to the restricted distribution of this species, known only from Isla del Coco, Costa Rica. The name also refers to the isolation imposed on the author by the COVID-19 pandemic, providing an opportunity to complete the description of this species whose distinctiveness had been known for some time. The common name of "Pandemic Blenny" ("Tubícola Pandémica" in Spanish) is suggested in light of these difficult times".
- Corethrella menini Feijó, Picelli, Ríos-Velásquez & Pessoa, 2021 (Insect, Diptera, Corethrellidae) – "Corethrella menini sp. nov. is named in honor of Dr. Marcelo Menin as a tribute to his important work as a herpetologist, focused on ecology and biology of anurans. Marcelo was a professor of zoology who inspired dozens of zoology students, a beloved friend. He passed away too young during the COVID pandemic."
- Epeus covid Lin, Y.J., Li, S.Q. & Pham, D.S. 2023. Taxonomic notes on some spider species (Arachnida: Araneae) from China and Vietnam.
- Gigantometopus coronobtectus Kim, Taszakowski & Jung, 2021 (Insect, Hemiptera, Miridae) – "Coronobtectus from the name "coronavirus" and the Latin word obtectus, meaning covered, because the dark band on its frons resembles dark protective masks worn by people during the pandemic of COVID-19."
- Humbertium covidum Justine, Gastineau, Gros, Gey, Ruzzier, Charles & Winsor, 2022 (Flatworm, Tricladida, Geoplanidae) – "the specific name covidum was chosen as homage to the numerous casualties worldwide of the COVID-19 pandemic. Furthermore, a large part of this study was written during the lockdowns"
- Nisitrus rindu Robillard & Tan, 2021 (Insect, Orthoptera, Gryllidae) – "This species name refers to the word 'rindu', which means 'love' [verb] in Iban [a group of indigenous people from Borneo] language and 'home-sickness' = 'miss' [verb] in Bahasa Melayu (Malay language) and Indonesian. This new species is dedicated to the front-liners fighting against the COVID-19 pandemic who were far from their homes and loved ones during the early phase of the global pandemic (when the speciesʼ name was chosen)".
- Oxymorus johnprinei Borovec & Meregalli, 2020 (Insect, Coleoptera, Curculionidae) – named "in memory of the late John Prine (1946–2020), American folk singer and songwriter who sadly passed away due to COVID-19 while the authors were completing the paper"
- Parmulopsyllus iamarinoi Borges, Farias, Mácola, Neves & Johnsson, 2021 (Crustacean, Siphonostomatoida, Entomolepididae) – "named in honor of Atila Iamarino, biologist, PhD in microbiology and scientific communicator for his notorious work informing, educating and raising awareness in combating misinformation about covid- 19".
- Potamophylax coronavirus Ibrahimi, 2021 (Insect, Trichoptera, Limnephilidae) – named after the coronavirus
- Periclimenaeus karantina Park & De Grave, 2021 (Crustacean, Decapoda, Palaemonidae) – named from the Greek karantina (καραντίνα, 'quarantine'), referring to the lifestyle of the new species within the host ascidian species. It also alludes to the quarantine of human society due to the coronavirus pandemic (COVID-19), during which time this paper was written.
- Segestes nostosalgos Tan & Wahab, 2020 (Insect, Orthoptera, Tettigoniidae) – named after 'homecoming' (nostos, 'homecoming' in Greek) and 'pain' (algos, 'pain, grief or distress' in Greek). The authors wrote that "the species is dedicated to those who are far away from home during the Covid-19 pandemic and any difficult times".
- Sibogasyrinx clausura Kantor & Puillandre, 2021 (Mollusc, Conoidea, Cochlespiridae) – named clausura (noun in apposition), meaning 'lockdown', "with reference to the sanitary restrictions associated with SARS-COV-2 that prevailed over much of the World when this manuscript was finalized".
- Stethantyx covida Khalaim & Ruíz-Cancino, 2020 (Insect, Hymenoptera, Ichneumonidae) – "named after the Covid-19 (Coronavirus) because the taxon was described while the outbreak of this virus in Mexico."
- Thoonchus covidus Zograf, Pyvlyuk, Trebukhova & Li, 2020 (Nematode, Enchelidiidae) named after the disease
- Trigonopterus corona Narakusumo & Riedel, 2021 (Insect, Coleoptera, Curculionidae) – named after the coronavirus
- Typhlamphiascus medici Gómez, Corgosinho & Rivera-Sánchez, 2021 (Crustacean, Harpacticoida, Miraciidae) – "The specific epithet from the Latin 'medicī', 'doctor', 'physician', is dedicated in honour and to the memory of all physicians and health personnel for their self-sacrifice during the fight against the COVID-19 pandemic."

== Fungi ==
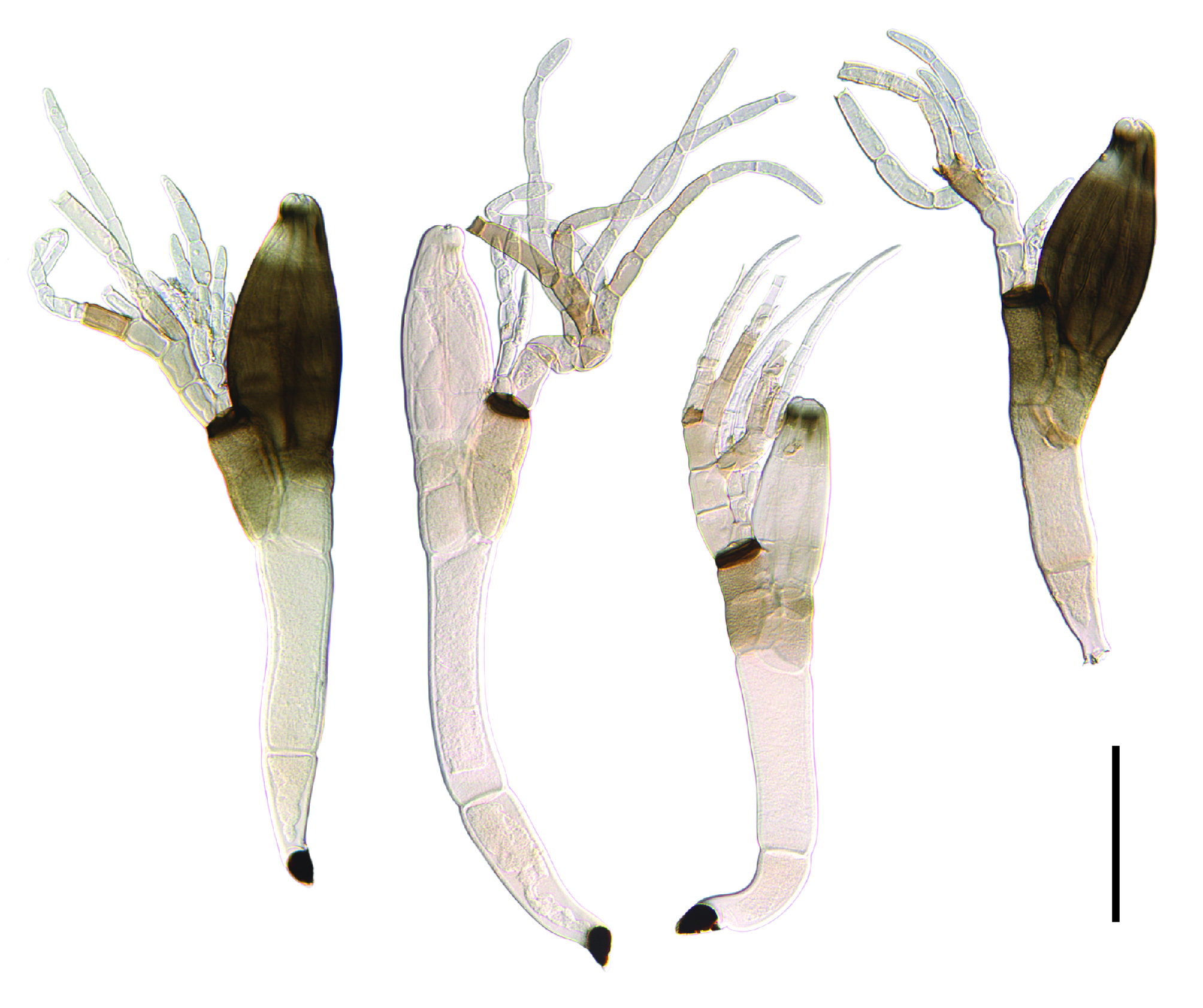
The parasitic fungus Laboulbenia quarantenae

(in alphabetical order of genera)

- Dendrostoma covidicola Samarak. & Jian K. Liu, 2021 (Diaporthales, Erythrogloeaceae) — the epithet covidicola referring to "the COVID-19 pandemic and as a tribute to the battle against COVID-19."
- Diabolocovidia claustri – name of genus (Diabolocovidia) based on the virus and name of species (claustri) based on the lockdown
- Laboulbenia quarantenae De Kesel & Haelew., 2020 (Laboulbeniales, Laboulbeniaceae) – named after the quarantine.

== Plants ==
(in alphabetical order of genera)

- Hypnea corona Huisman & Petrocelli, 2021 (Algae, Gigartinales, Cystocloniaceae) – the authors wrote: "The epithet is from the Latin corona (a crown) and refers to crown-like appearance of the propagules. This epithet was selected prior to the 2020/2021 pandemic, but its use can also serve as a reminder of this difficult period".
