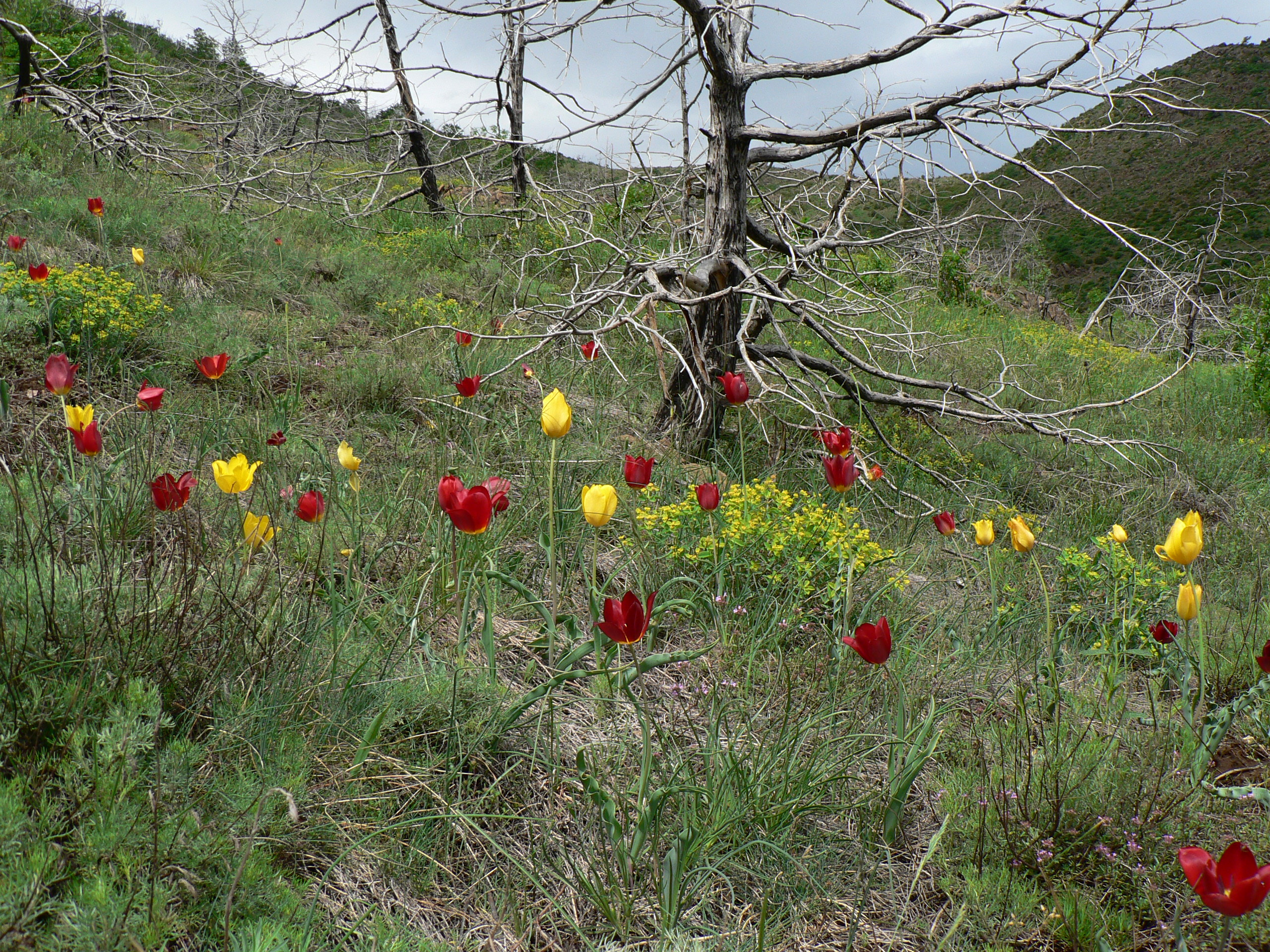

Conservation status
- Critically Endangered (IUCN 3.1)

Scientific classification
- Kingdom: Plantae
- Clade: Tracheophytes
- Clade: Angiosperms
- Clade: Monocots
- Order: Liliales
- Family: Liliaceae
- Subfamily: Lilioideae
- Genus: Tulipa
- Subgenus: Tulipa subg. Tulipa
- Species: T. albanica

Binomial name
- Tulipa albanica Kit Tan & Shuka

= Tulipa albanica =

Species of flowering plant

Tulipa albanica is a flowering plant in the tulip genus, family Liliaceae that is native to Albania. It was discovered near the village of Surroj in Albania in 2010. The plant is a critically endangered species (CR) as it grows in an area smaller than 100 ha, surrounded by mining activities.

Related species include Tulipa scardica and Tulipa suaveolens (syn. T. schrenkii). T. albanica bears morphological similarities to both species, as well as growing in a similar environment, but can be distinguished genetically as well as by the undulating leaf shape of T. albanica.

== Description ==
Tulipa albanica is a bulbous perennial reaching 15–40 cm (6–16 in) in height. The bulb is ovoid to ovoid-globose and 1.5 to 2.5 cm (5/8 to 1 in) in diameter. The stem is erect, glabrous, glaucous to greyish-green and the leaves, which vary from 3–5, reach a size of about 10–25 cm (4–10 in) long by 1–3.5 cm (3/8–1 3/8 in), and are glaucous to greyish-green. They grow alternately along the stem and the lowermost ones have strongly undulated edges.

The stem bears a solitary large, erect, campanulate flower. It can be found in two colour: yellow to golden-yellow or carmine-scarlet to deep reddish-brown. The chromosome number is 2n = 2x = 24.

== Conservation ==
The Institute for Environmental Policy, a local NGO is carrying out monitoring and conservation actions, with the aim to propagate the plant to other locations in the region of Kukës, and secure its survival.

== Taxonomy ==
Tulipa albanica was formally described as a distinct species in 2010 by botanists Kit Tan and Lulëzim Shuka following field studies in northeastern Albania. The type locality is situated about 6 km from Kolshi village towards Surroj, Kukësi district, in Albania. Specimens designated as the holotype were collected on 7 May 2009 from north- and west-facing stony serpentine slopes, amidst open woodlands dominated by Quercus pubescens and scrub of Buxus sempervirens. Holotype specimens are deposited at the herbarium of the University of Tirana (TIR). The specific epithet albanica denotes the country Albania, highlighting the species' geographic discovery and distribution.

The affinities of Tulipa albanica have been discussed with reference to the morphologically similar Tulipa scardica, native to the western Balkans (including North Macedonia and Kosovo), and Tulipa schrenkii, which occurs across the Ukraine, Caucasus, Central and Southwest Asia. Although it shares similarities in flower appearance with these species, distinct differences are evident. In particular, T. albanica has strongly undulated and distinctly channelled lower leaves, contrasting the flat or slightly undulate leaves typical of the related species. Moreover, it lacks the black basal blotch on the perianth segments, a feature commonly seen in T. scardica and T. schrenkii. Additional distinguishing traits from T. scardica include golden-yellow filaments rather than white or dark ones, smaller capsules, and larger seeds.

Prior to the description of T. albanica, the only native tulip recognized in Albania was Tulipa australis. Observations confirmed the existence of two morphotypes of T. australis distinguished by slight differences in flower shape, size, and colour, associated respectively with limestone and serpentine substrates.
