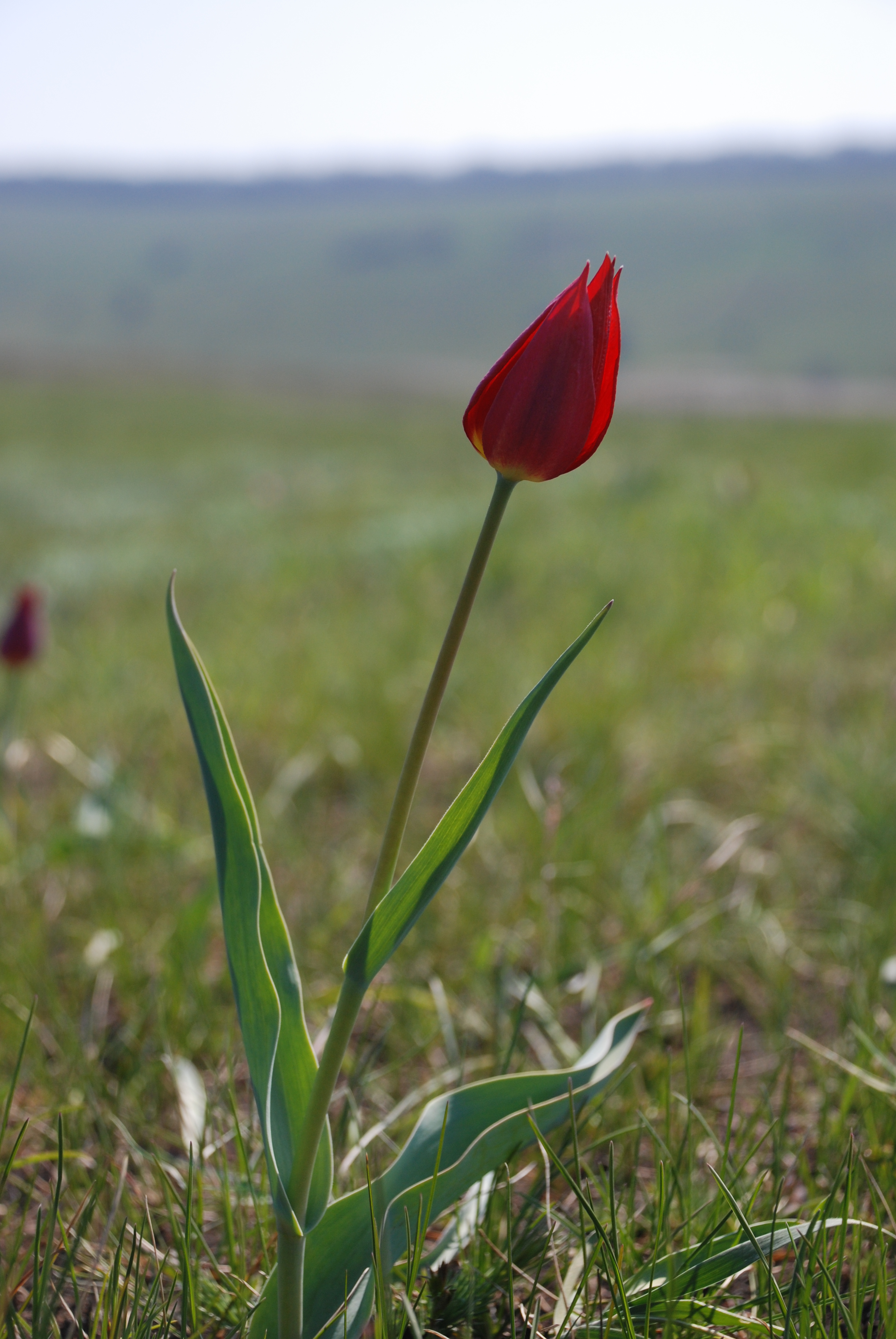

Scientific classification
- Kingdom: Plantae
- Clade: Embryophytes
- Clade: Tracheophytes
- Clade: Angiosperms
- Clade: Monocots
- Order: Liliales
- Family: Liliaceae
- Subfamily: Lilioideae
- Genus: Tulipa
- Species: T. suaveolens

Binomial name
- Tulipa suaveolens Roth

Synonyms
- Tulipa gesneriana var. acutiflora Pacz.; Tulipa gesneriana subsp. schrenkii (Regel) Nyman; Tulipa hortulanorum Wender.; Tulipa monticola E.Wulff; Tulipa odoratissima Vis.; Tulipa oxypetala Steven; Tulipa schrenkii Regel; Tulipa splendens Delip.; Tulipa suaveolens var. bicolor Regel; Tulipa suaveolens var. pluriflora Regel; Tulipa turcarum Levier; Tulipa volgensis M.Bieb. ex Eichw.

= Tulipa suaveolens =

Species of flowering plant

Tulipa suaveolens, synonym Tulipa schrenkii, the van Thol tulip or Schrenck's tulip, is a bulbous herbaceous perennial of species of tulip (Tulipa) in the family Liliaceae. It belongs to section Tulipa. It is the probable wild ancestor of the garden tulip (Tulipa gesneriana).

== Description ==
The tunic of the bulb is dark brown. Stiff hairs grow on the inside, especially towards the tip. The three to four leaves are glaucous and undulate. They are normally 10, sometimes up to 20 cm long and 3–6 cm wide. The stem is 15–30 cm long and glabrous, sometimes slightly hairy. The flowers are bowl shaped and very varied in colour. They can be red, light-red, pink, mauve, yellow or white. There are also forms with red petals bordered in yellow or white

== Systematics ==
The species was first described in 1794 by Albrecht Wilhelm Roth in the Annalen der Botanik (ed. Usteri) 10, 44. as Tulipa suaveolens. The Latin epithet suaveolens means 'sweet-smelling'. Different species were described from different sites, which later turned out to be all members of the species Tulipa schrenckii. Tulipa schrenckii was described in 1873 by Eduard August von Regel in the Trudy Imperatorskago S.-Peterburgskago Botaničeskago Sada. The epithet schrenkii honours the Baltic-German botanist Alexander Gustav von Schrenk.

== Habitat ==
Tulipa suaveolens inhabits the Eurasian steppe: the southern and eastern Ukraine, Crimea, the European part of Russia, especially on the lower Don, around the Sea of Azov, and major part of Ciscaucasia (in south until North-Ossetia, Kabardino-Balkaria and in the former Chechen-Ingush region, Terek, northern Dagestan), in the south-east of Voronezh Oblast, major part of Volgograd Oblast and Saratov Oblast, southern Samara Oblast, Orenburg Oblast, western and northern Kazakhstan, and the lowlands of western Siberia, Central Asia and China. It also occurs locally in western Iran and Azerbaijan.

The status of the Anatolian populations is dubious, as they could be descended from plants previously cultivated in gardens and parks. Gerhard Pils only lists Tulipa sylvestris, Tulipa humilis, Tulipa saxatilis and Tulipa armena as wild species. Christenhuit et al. assume "ca. seven" wild species, without listing them however.

Tulipa schrenckii grows in meadows and lawns of the Eurasian steppe; there it can flower thickly and as far as the eye can see, even sometimes in semideserts, up to 600 m ASL.

In Russia and Kazakhstan this tulip is a protected species.

== History ==
The wild Tulipa suaveolens is known in Turkey as Kefe Lale (also "Cafe-Lale" after the medieval name of Kaffa on the Crimea). Sultan Selim II had 300.000 bulbs brought from Kefe for the gardens of the Topkapı-Sarajı in Istanbul. They are hybridized with other species present in the collections. These tulips hybrided were imported by Europeans starting from the 16th. century, particularly in Netherlands. They are at the origin of the garden tulip, Tulipa × gesneriana. Tulipa suaveolens is very narrowly related to Tulipa gesneriana, and sometimes classified in the same species.

Tulipa suaveolens is also a progenitor of the low-growing Duc-tulips (also called Dukes, Dux or Ducks), which are attested in the Netherlands since the end of the 16th. century. They were named for Adrian Duyk from Oud-Karspel in the Netherlands. A painting by Jakob de Gheyn II., originating between 1600 and 1603 depicts shells, a caterpillar and a vase with love-in the mist, a snake's head fritillary, roses, Aquilegia, lilies-of the valley, pansies and a Tulipa schrenckii with pointed petals. A moth is sitting on the vase. Drawings by Jakob de Gheyn show this plant as well Bulbs of Tulipa suaveolens were imported 1881 into the Netherlands, where they were hybridised with other domesticated tulips. Johannes Marius Cornelis Hoog thinks that it is one of the parent species of the horned tulip, Tulipa cornuta, (often wrongly labelled as Tulipa acuminata in the bulb-trade).

== Gallery ==
Wild Schrenk's tulips in natural biotope

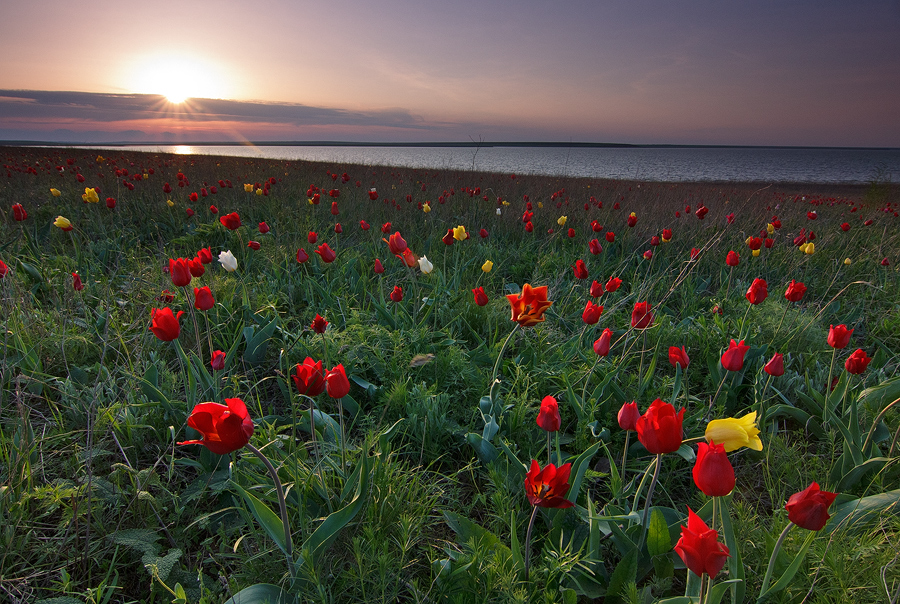
In a protected area bordering the lake Manych-Gudilo, Kalmykia, Russia.

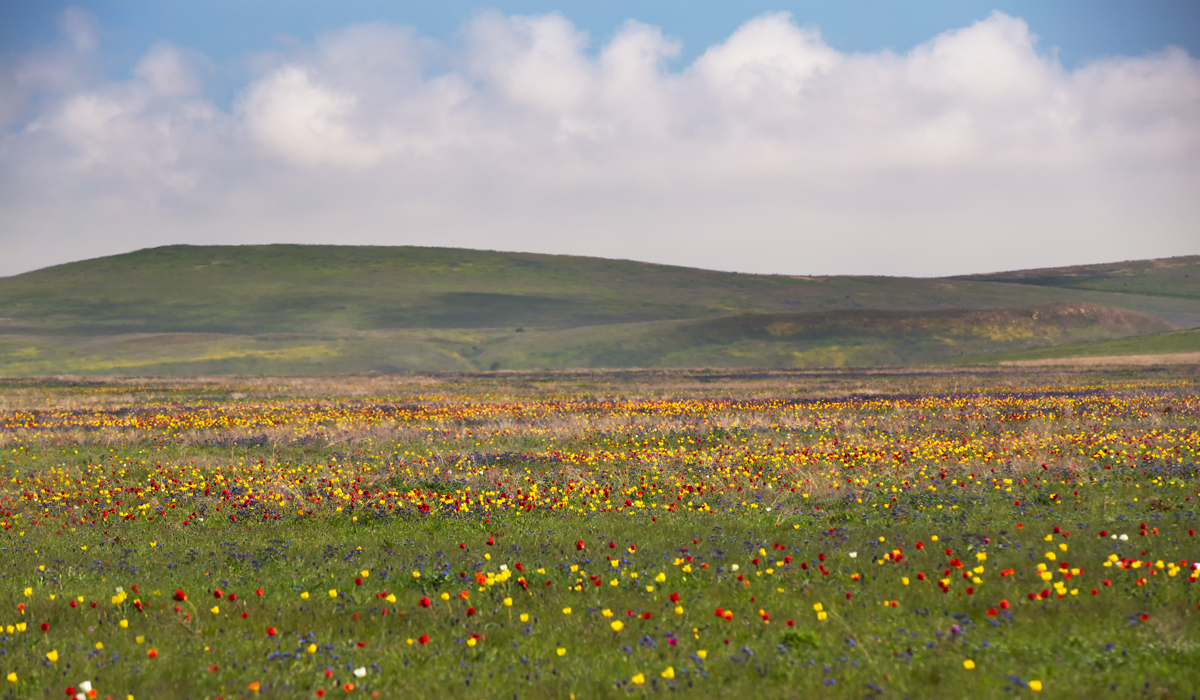
In the steppe of Crimea, Kerch Peninsula.

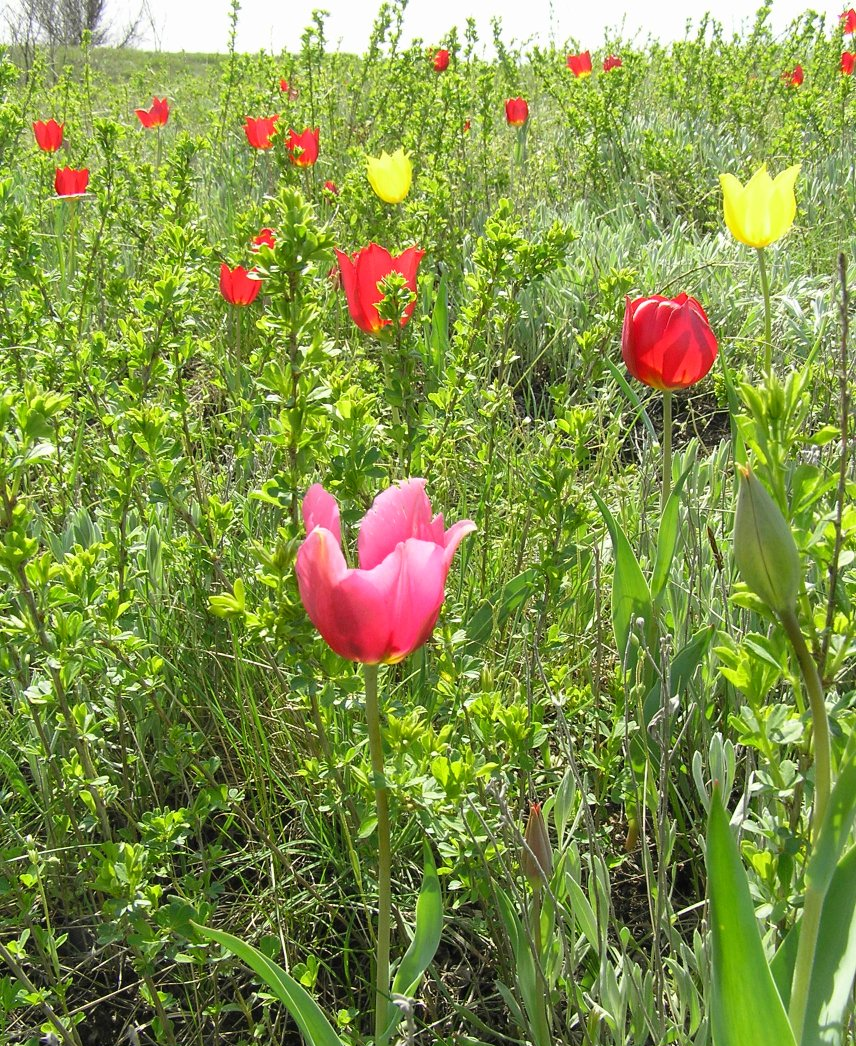
In a protected area of the Luhansk Oblast, Ukraine.

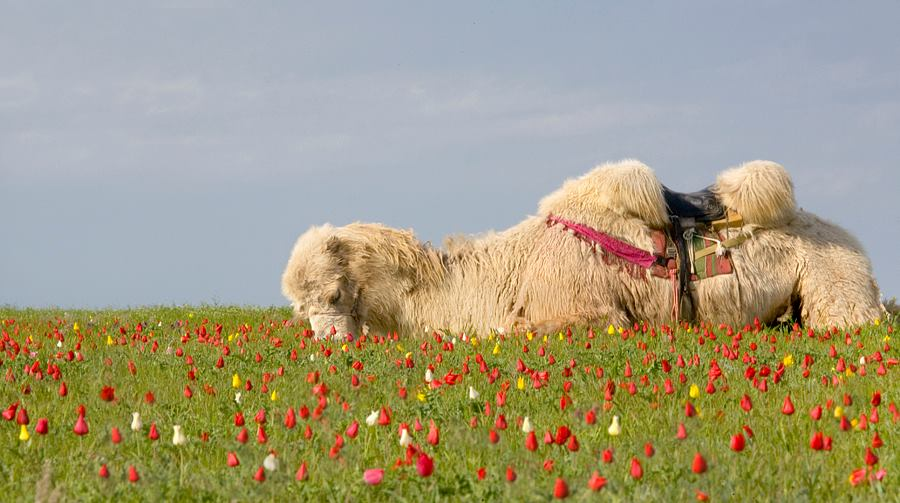
A resting Bactrian camel in spring in Kalmykian steppe, Russia.

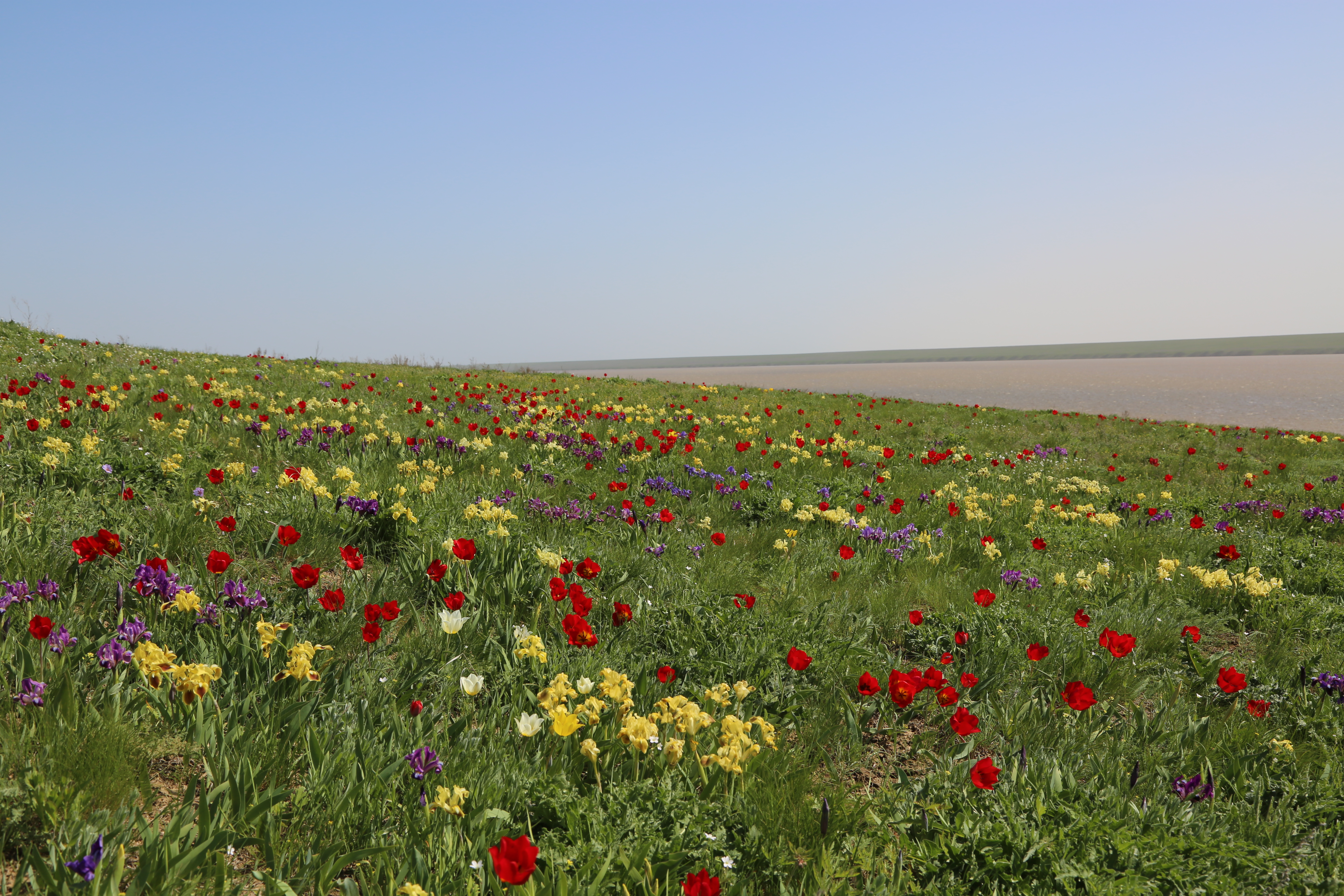
In steppe, Iris pumila flowered at the same time as the tulips. Rostov Oblast, Russia

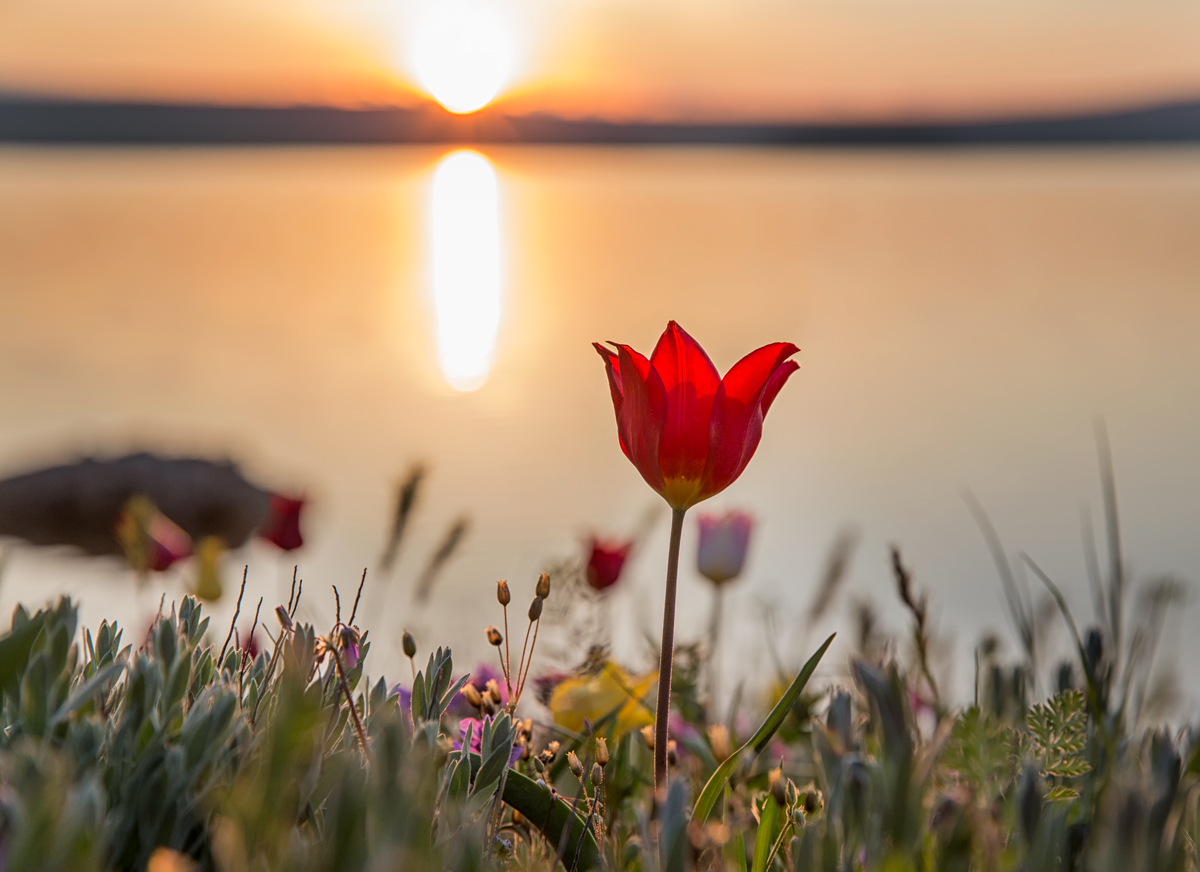
A red specimen in Crimea

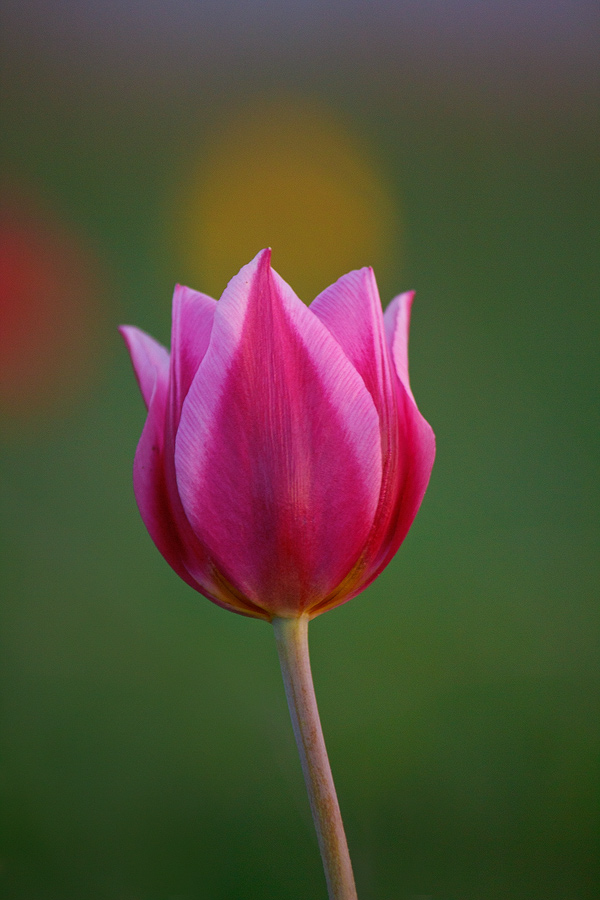
A pink and mauve specimen in Russia (lake Manych-Gudilo), common.

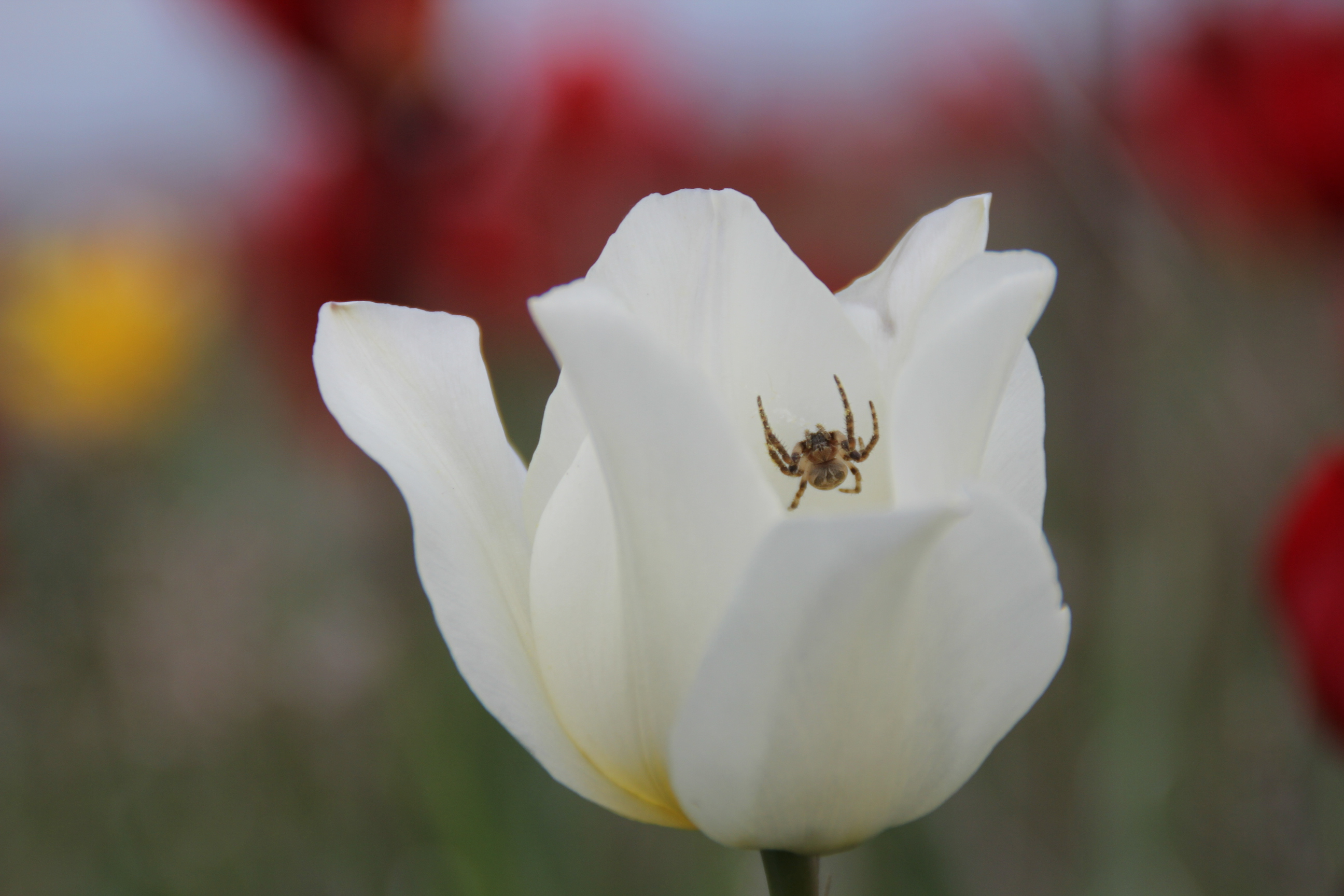
White specimen (lake Manych-Gudilo).

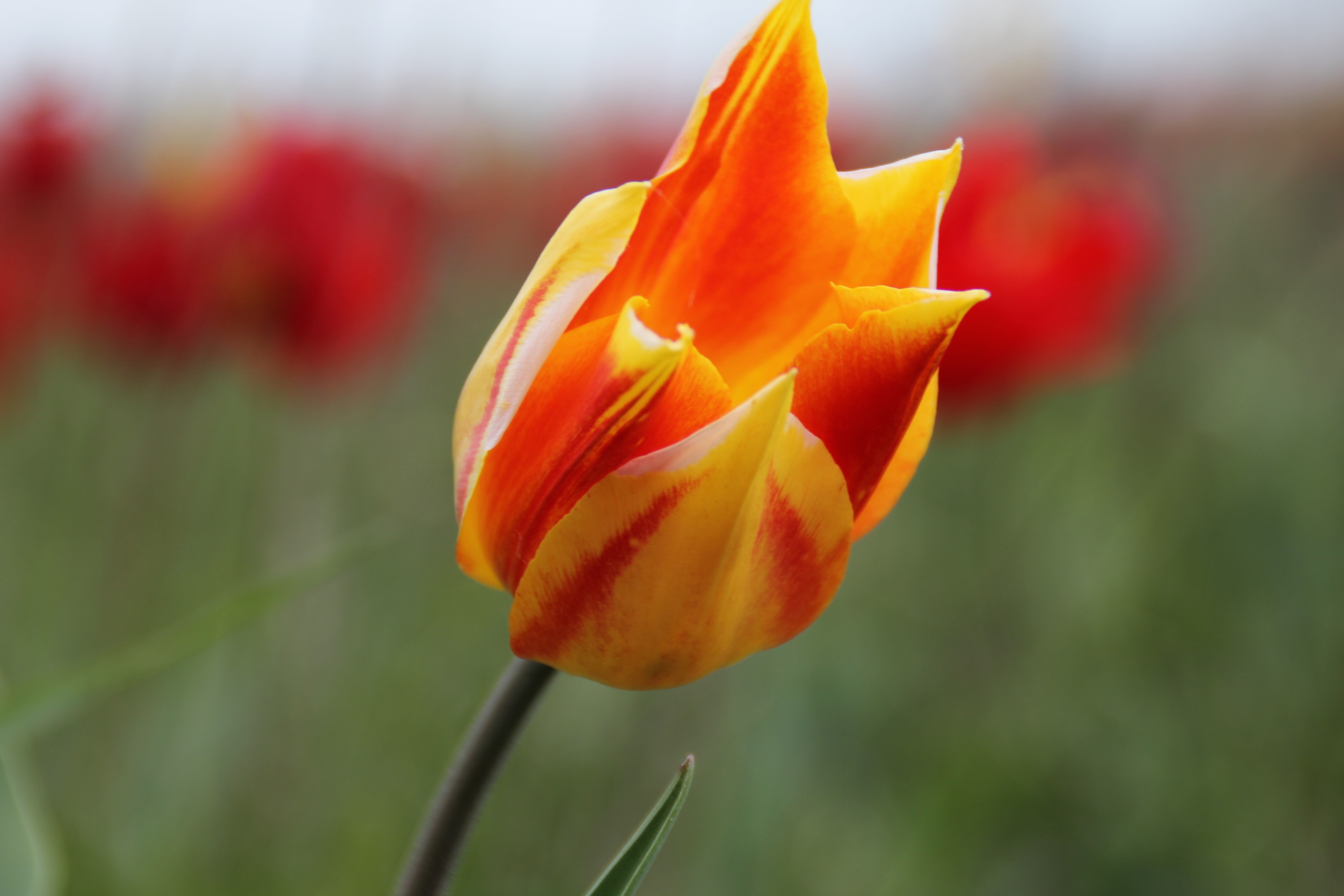
Yellow and red specimen (lake Manych-Gudilo), common.

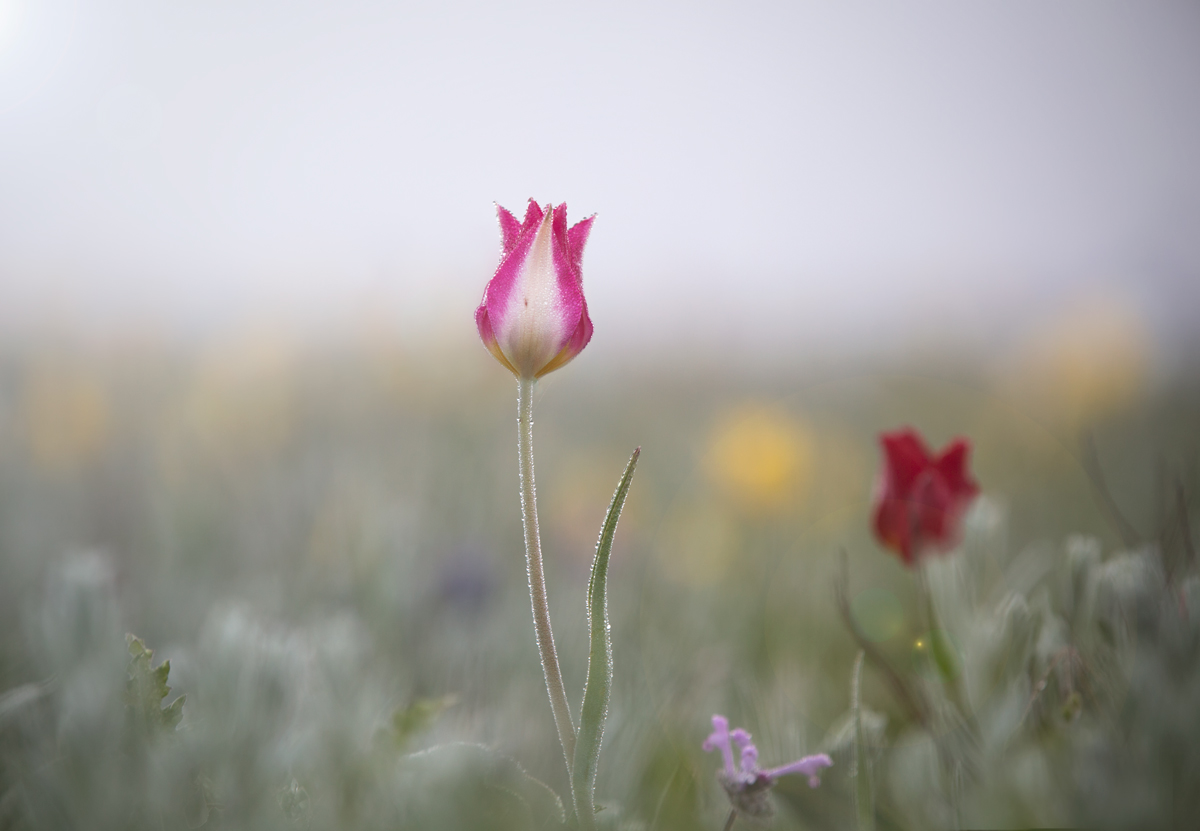
A wild white and pink specimen in Crimea.

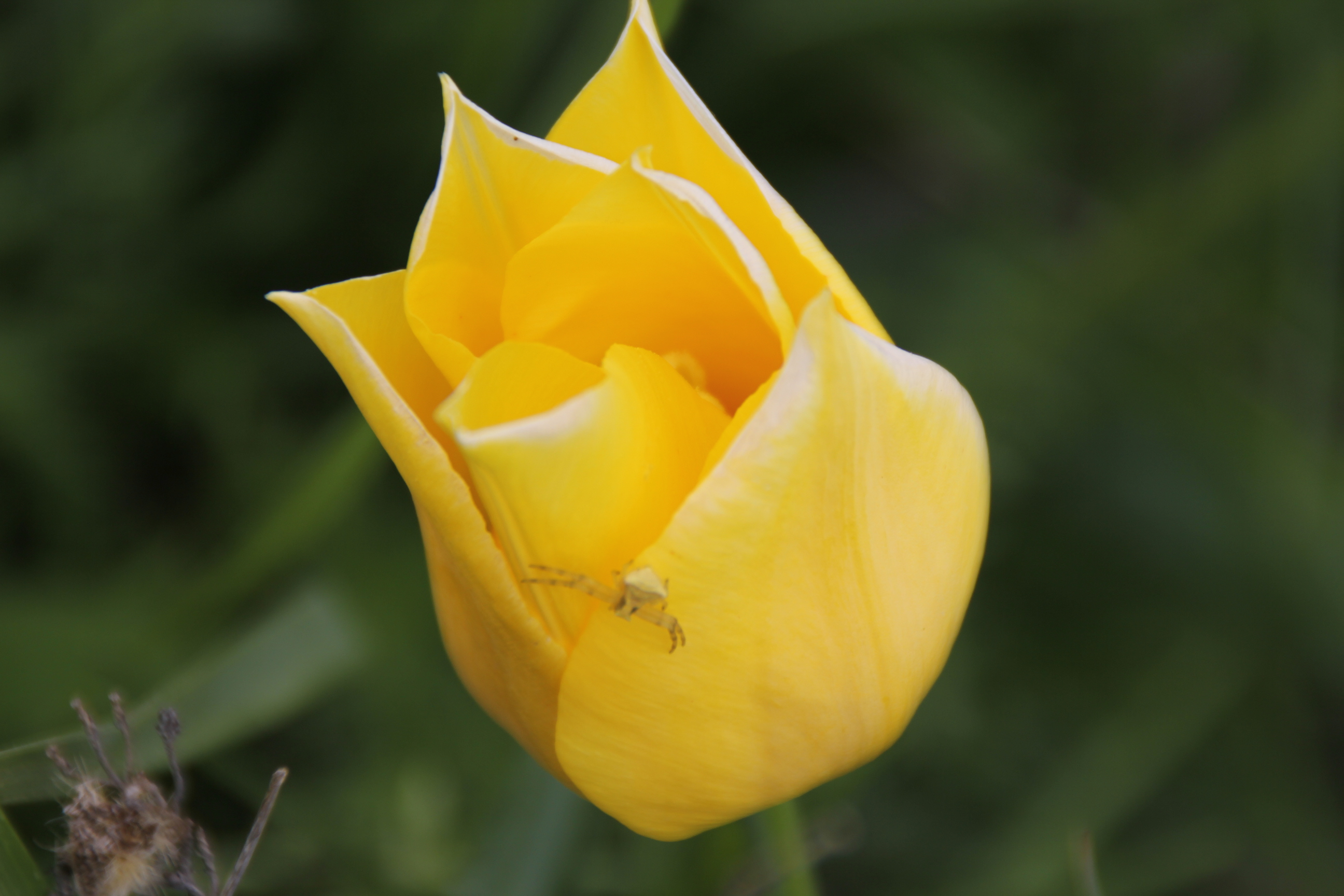
Yellow specimen (lake Manych-Gudilo).

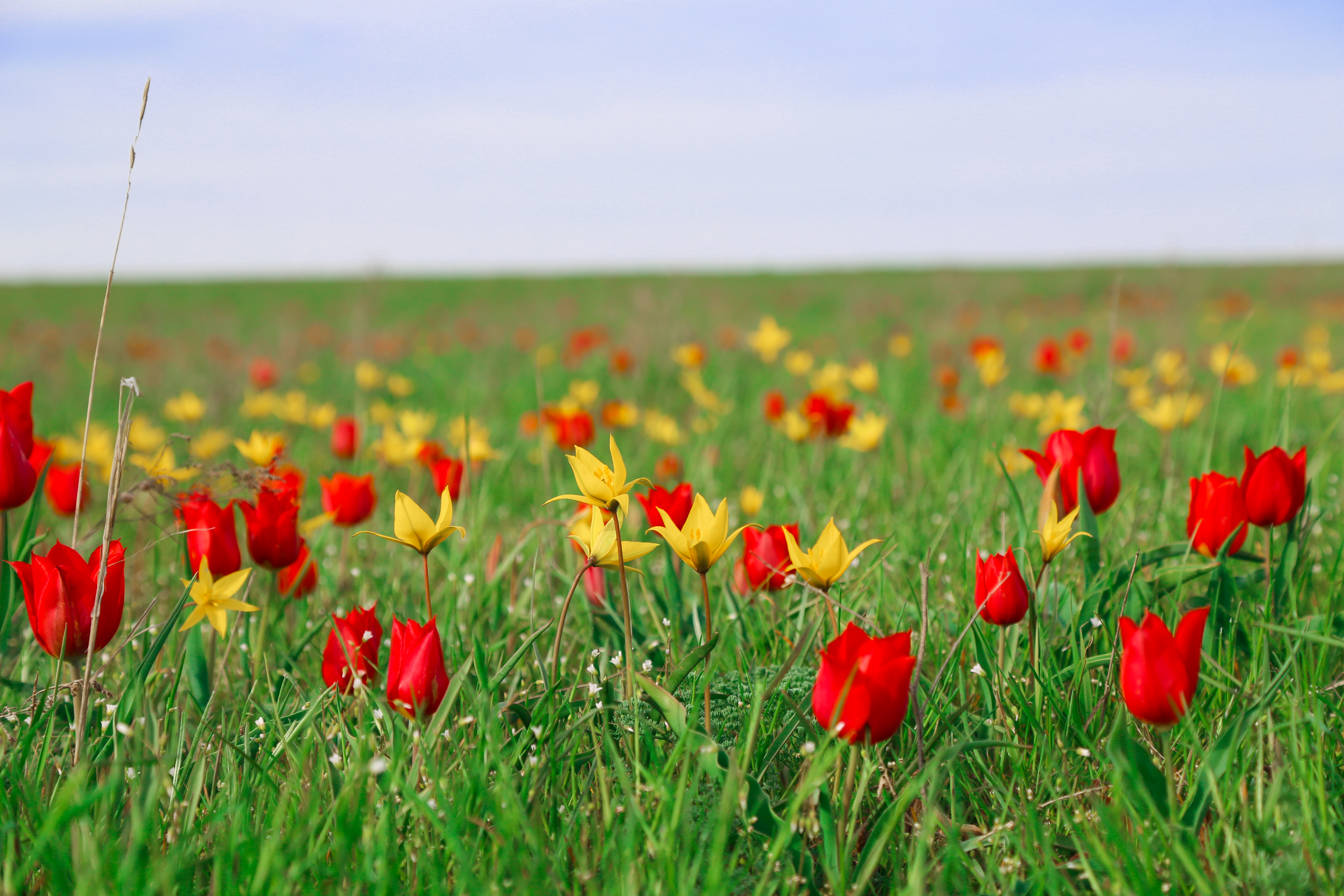
An entirely red stand of Tulipa suaveolens, accompanied by yellow Tulipa sylvestris, Rostov Oblast.

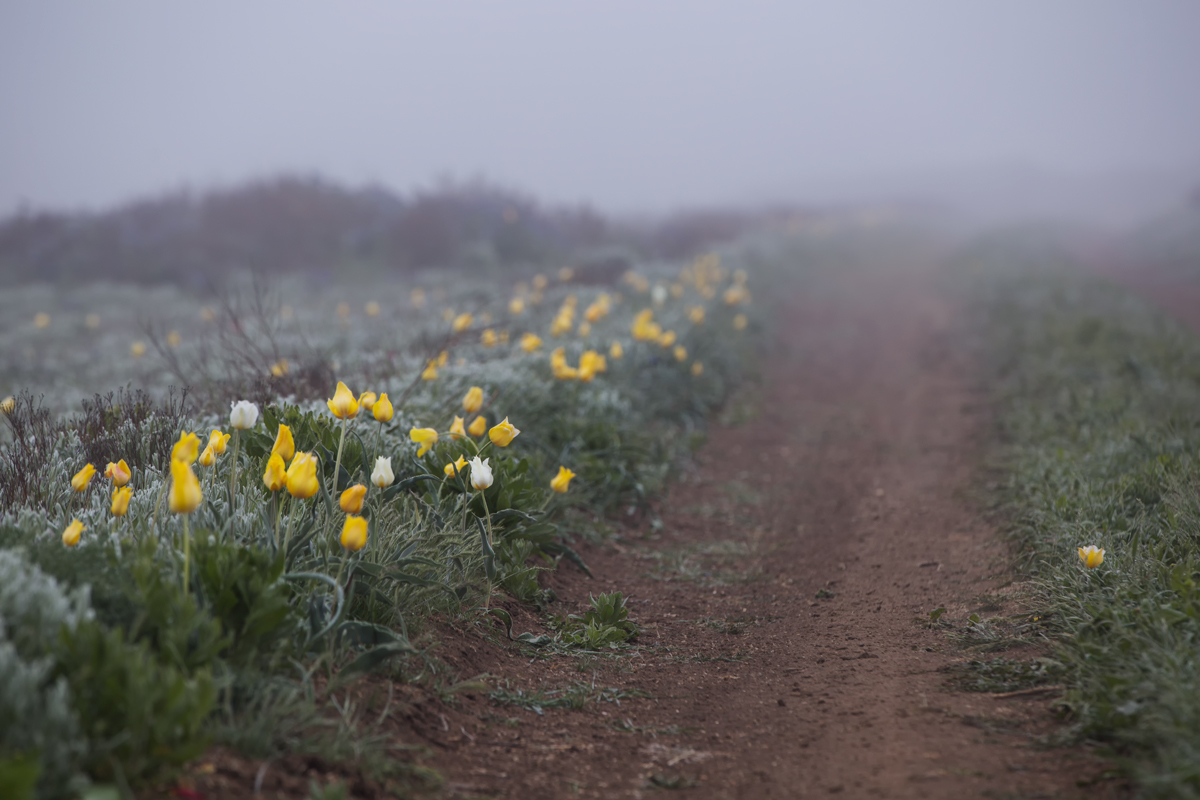
Yellow and white stand of Tulipa suaveolens, Crimea.
