= Wilson Kokalari =

Albanian Aerospace engineering

- Born: 1936; Gjirokaster, Albania
- Died: March 23, 2014 (aged 78); New York, United States
- Education: Purdue University
- Occupations: Astronautics and Aerospace engineering
- Known for: Contributed to the Apollo 11 Mission
- Children: 2

Wilson Kokalari (1936 – March 23, 2014) was an Albanian-American Engineer who played an active role in the Apollo Space Program, contributing significantly to the Apollo 11 mission. Kokalari helped design the Apollo 11 spacecraft, served as the final system tester, and authored the extensive engineering report after a rigorous two-year testing project.

== Family and childhood ==
=== Early life ===
Kokalari was born in Gjirokaster in 1936 to a family of merchants. One of the early female intellectuals in Albania, Musine Kokalari, a distinguished figure in his family, was imprisoned by the communists. He was just a year old when his family relocated to New York. Although his father was in business, Wilson Kokalari chose to follow his passion for engineering.

=== Family ===
After establishing himself in New York, Wilson's father Hilmi Kokalari adopted the name Michael and ventured into business. Initially dealing in imported Albanian olives and cheeses, the disruptions caused by the Italian occupation of Albania in 1939 and subsequent wartime events halted trade. Kokalari transitioned to real estate dealings and achieved significant commercial triumph, acquiring numerous Manhattan properties by the 1950s.

== Role in NASA ==
Following his studies at Purdue University, Wilson Kokalari began his career at NASA. The Apollo Program, initially stalled due to funding, gained momentum after the Soviets' space success in 1961. President Kennedy's promise to send a man to the Moon within the decade sparked NASA's massive effort, involving 400,000 people and a $24 billion investment. Under this initiative, various companies competed for NASA contracts, including North American Aviation for the Command Service Module and Grumman Aircraft Engineering Corporation for the Lunar Excursion Module. Wilson Kokalari, a rare individual, contributed to both companies in constructing essential parts for the lunar mission among several others involved in the project. Kokalari played a pivotal role in the project, serving as the primary final tester for the entire system and authoring the critical Test Project Engineering Report, a crucial step in the process. Over a rigorous two-year period, he meticulously drafted the extensive testing program, consisting of thousands of pages, ensuring meticulous scrutiny of subsystems and overall spaceship functionality—crucial for obtaining the launch license. Wilson Kokalari shared a rare glimpse into the testing procedures through a confidential book titled "Apollo," a closely guarded secret during its time and bearing his name on the cover. Although he authored it and held significant trust, he couldn't take it outside the workplace. Amid popular knowledge of missions like Apollo 11 and 13, Kokalari was deeply involved in lesser-known missions, including Apollo 8, 9, and 10, undertaken to expedite lunar landings and counter Soviet progress in space exploration. His pivotal role remained central in multiple moon landing missions, including Apollo 11, 12, and 14-17.

== Achievement ==
In gratitude for the collective effort behind the Moon landing, the first astronauts carried a plaque inscribed with the names and signatures of the technical team, including Wilson Kokalari's, which they placed alongside the American flag on the lunar surface. Kokalari humorously recalls that initially, only the core team's names were meant to be on the plaque, later extended to include the entire team responsible for the spaceship's testing.

This detail is featured in "Albanians of America" by Vehbi Bajrami, where the author also interviews William Gregory, an Albanian-American astronaut. Attempts to connect with Kokalari for the book's content occurred post-publication. When asked about astronaut Allen Sheppard's supposed Albanian origin, Kokalari, familiar with the astronauts from his NASA years, humorously remarked on the extent of claims about ancestry, citing a lighthearted example involving Abraham Lincoln. Even after nearly 50 years, the historic Moon landing remains a remarkable feat in human history. Wilson Kokalari cherished his involvement with the Apollo program, having witnessed each phase of its development. Kokalari valued the experience over financial gains, likening it to contributing to iconic feats like the Pyramids or the Great Wall of China. His Albanian-American community rightly celebrates his achievements, recognizing their significance in global history. Despite Kokalari's modesty, the magnitude of his contribution to the Apollo project occasionally overwhelmed him, reflecting on the surreal experience of seeing the spacecraft bound for the Moon and acknowledging its uniqueness.

== See also ==
- List of Albanian inventions and discoveries
