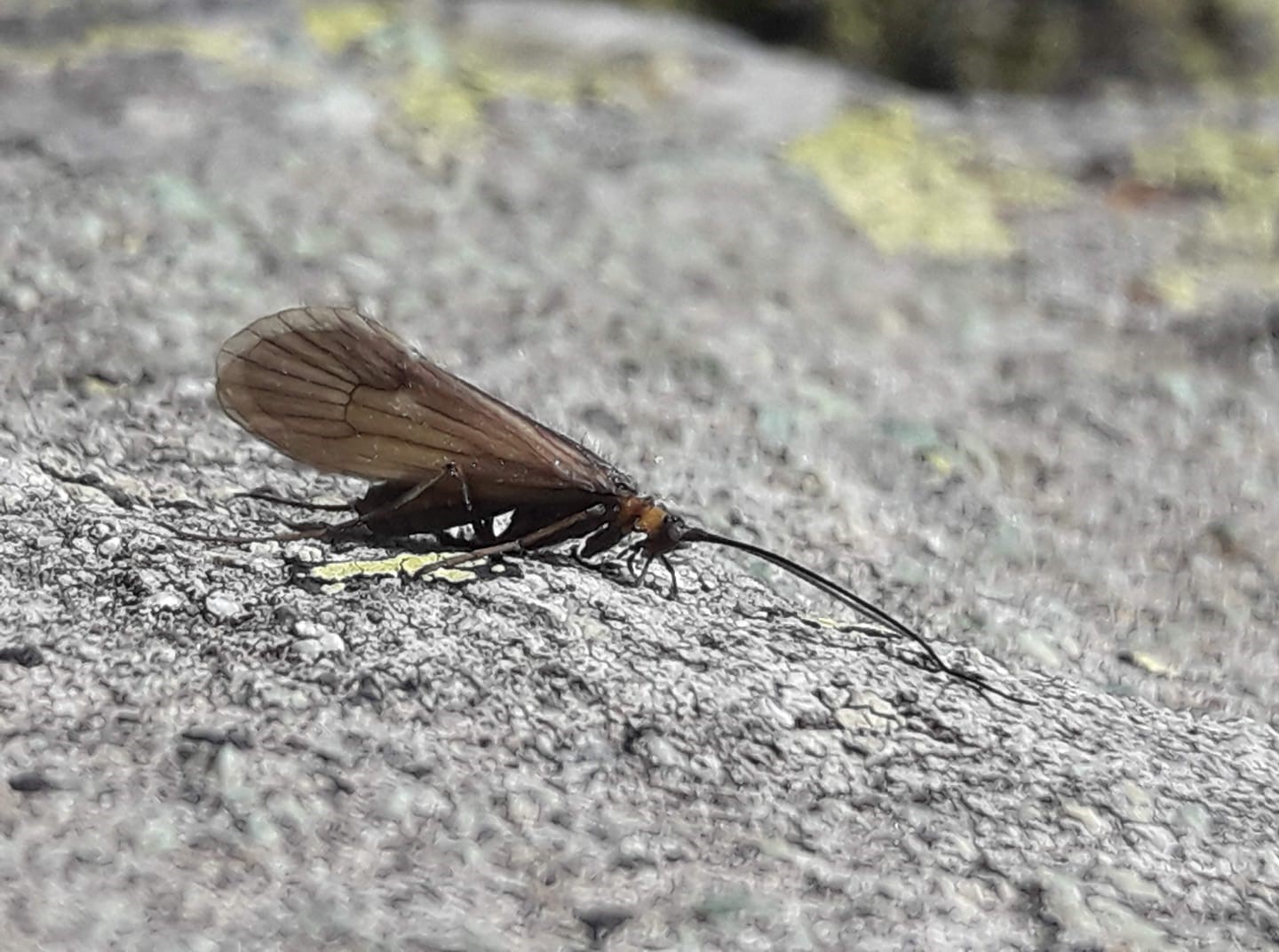
- Male adult

Scientific classification
- Kingdom: Animalia
- Phylum: Arthropoda
- Class: Insecta
- Order: Trichoptera
- Family: Limnephilidae
- Genus: Potamophylax
- Species: P. coronavirus

Binomial name
- Potamophylax coronavirus Ibrahimi, Bilalli, and Vitecek, 2021

= Potamophylax coronavirus =

Species of caddisfly

Potamophylax coronavirus is a species of caddisfly in the family Limnephilidae. It is endemic to Kosovo. It was named after the COVID-19 pandemic.

== Description ==
The male's head and appendages are brown, with the prothorax, sclerites of mesothorax, metathorax and coxae dark brown to black, femora and tibiae brown, and the tarsi gradually darkening to the apex.

The only known female resembles P. juliani and is lighter-coloured. Its head and appendages are brown, as well as the femora and tibiae, the prothorax, sclerites of mesothorax and metathorax light brown to brown, and the tarsi gradually darkening. The forewings, 8.5 mm long, are light brown and shorter than the abdomen, with very long setae. The genitalia remain undescribed, because the female has a slightly damaged terminalia.

== Habitat ==
The type locality of the species is a tributary of the Krojet e Ali Pashë Gucisë springs of the Lumbardhi i Deçanit river in the Bjeshkët e Nemuna National Park, and probably microendemic to, a "caddisfly hotspot" about 2,000 metres (6,600 ft) above sea level and 120 kilometres (75 mi) west of the capital Pristina. The river has been severed in recent years, due to the construction of a hydropower plant. The river basin habitat of P. coronavirus has been described as a "battlefield between scientists and civil society on one side and the management of the hydropower plant operating on this river on the other."

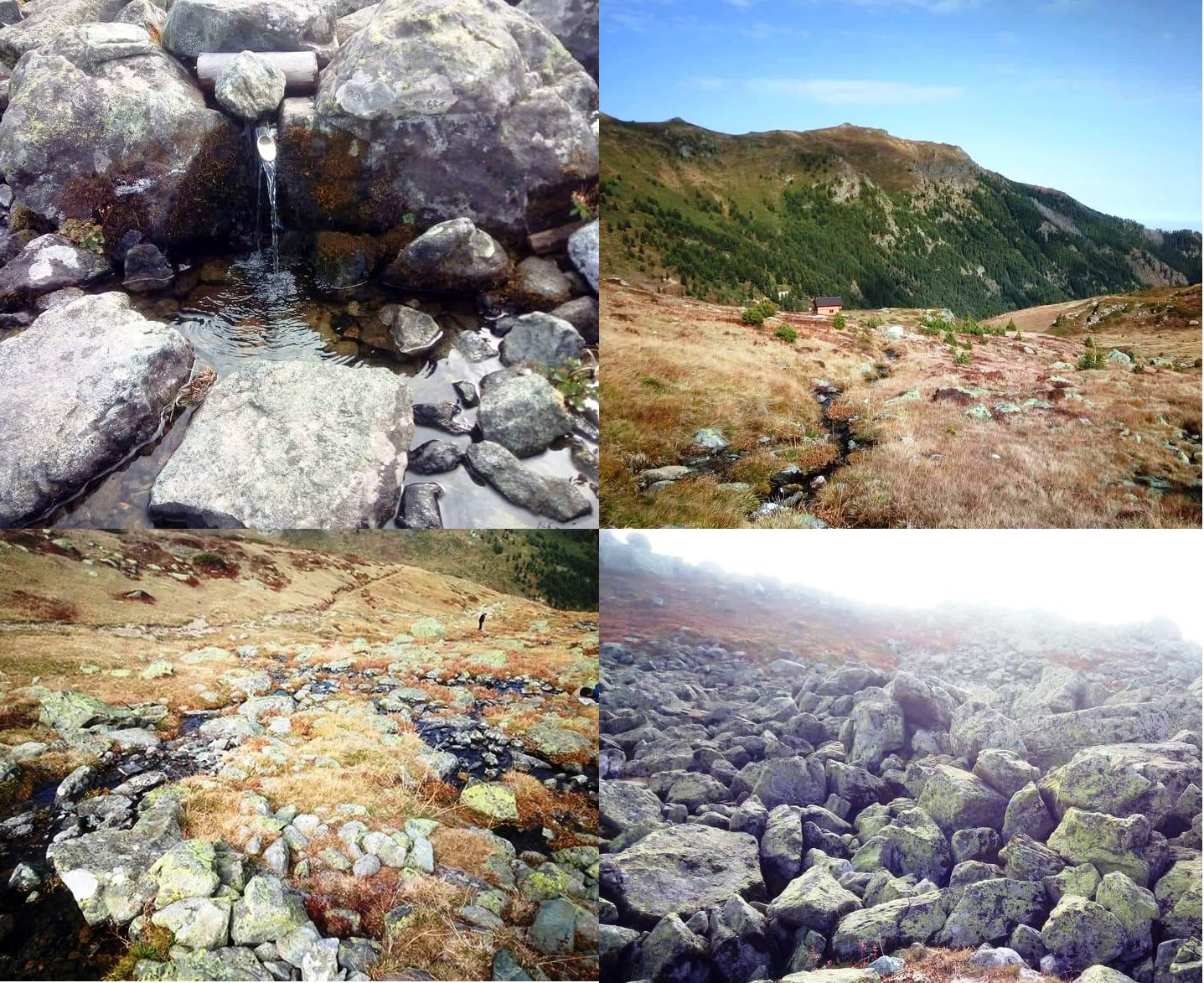
The type locality

== Taxonomy ==
It was described by a team of researchers, led by Halil Ibrahimi of the University of Pristina. The species belongs to the Potamophylax winneguthi species group and is morphologically similar to P. juliani and P. winneguthi. The type specimens were collected in 2014 a few years prior to description.

== Etymology ==
The specific name coronavirus refers to the COVID-19 pandemic. The author states that he also named this species in this manner to raise awareness towards environmental pollution in Kosovo and the Balkan countries which he quotes as a "silent pandemic on freshwater organisms in Kosovo rivers". It is the second organism to be named after the pandemic, following the curculionoid beetle (weevil) Stethantyx covida.

== See also ==
- List of species named after the COVID-19 pandemic
