= National Observatory and Planetarium of Kosovo =

Observatory and planetarium in Kosovo

Coordinates: 42°26′56″N 21°04′53″E

- Observatori dhe Planetariumi Kombëtar i Kosovës
- Established: 20 June 2024; 2 years ago
- Location: Shtime, District of Ferizaj, Kosovo
- Type: Observatory and planetarium

The National Observatory and Planetarium of Kosovo (Albanian: Observatori dhe Planetariumi Kombëtar i Kosovës) is the first observatory and planetarium in Kosovo.

== Overview ==
The new facility located in the town of Shtime, consists of a 50-seat planetarium under a 9-meter-wide dome, next to a 6-meter-wide dome that will be the observatory, housing a 14-inch-wide telescope donated by Celestron. The largest solar telescope in eastern Europe, also donated, is installed on the observatory's terrace.

This Science Center's idea was born with the formation of Astronomy Outreach of Kosovo. Among the big names of this non-governmental organization is Pranvera Hyseni, PhD Candidate in Planetary Sciences at the University of California Santa Cruz, USA. Pranvera is also the Founder of Astronomy Outreach of Kosovo (AOK) and former CEO.

Another name is Bujar Mehmeti, PhD Candidate in Medical Physics at the University of Wisconsin-Madison, USA. Bujar is a Member of the Executive Board of Astronomy Outreach of Kosovo and formerly held the position of International Relations Manager and Social Media Manager of AOK.

The story of the National Observatory and Planetarium of the Republic of Kosovo embraces High School Professor Milaim Rushiti who is CEO of AOK. Milaim is one of the Founders of AOK and he gave his land to the state to be able to build this Science Center.

== See also ==
- Pristina Observatory
