= Veso Bey alphabet =

Alphabet used for writing the Albanian language

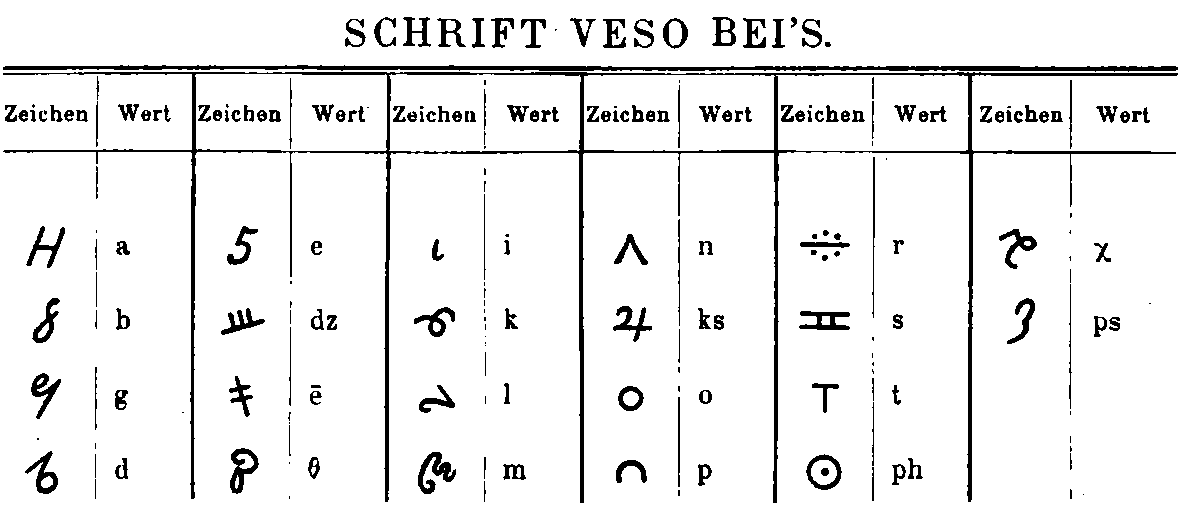
Veso Bey script

The Gjirokastër script, also known as Veso Bey alphabet (Albanian: Alfabeti i Veso Beut), is one of the original Albanian language alphabets of the 19th century. It is named after the town of Gjirokastër in South Albania where it was first encountered by the scholar Johann Georg von Hahn, also after Veso Bey, a rich local bey from the influential Alizoti family who provided it to Hahn. Hahn published in 1854 in his "Albanesische Studien", in Jena.

== History ==
According to Hahn, the alphabet was given to him by Veso bey, and had been used that far within Alizoti family circles.

"Finally, another alphabet from southern Albania must be recorded here, one which the present author owes the discovery of to Veso bey, who is one of the most prominent chiefs of Gjirokastër, from the family of the Alisot Pashalides. Veso Bey learned it in his youth from an Albanian hodja as a secret script which his family inherited, and used it himself for correspondence with his relatives.

== Script ==
The alphabet, probably cryptic, contains 22 letters.

== See also ==
- Vithkuqi alphabet
- Vellara alphabet
- Elbasan alphabet
