= Savo Gjirja =

Albanian research engineer (born 1945)

Savo Gjirja (born 11 December 1945, in Kavajë) is an Albanian research engineer who worked for the Volvo Corporation on the development of an ethanol fueled version of the car maker's TD73 diesel engine. He served as a professor at the Chalmers University of Technology in Gothenburg, Sweden.

== Work ==
Savo Gjirja graduated as a mechanical engineer at Tirana's University, Faculty of Engineering in 1969. In September 1972 he was appointed a lecturer of the scientific teaching staff at the same Engineering Faculty. From 1979 to 1983 he worked and studied as a researcher in the Department of Energy Conversion at the University of Technology "Chalmers" of Gothenburg, Sweden, where he defended his PhD dissertation. Four years later, Savo returned to Albania and began work at the Polytechnic University of Tirana, where he was appointed in charge of the Machinery department at the Faculty of Mechanical Engineering (1984). During this time he led the scientific and educational process of the department. For his work, the Higher Attestation Commission awarded him the title of Professor in 1987, while the Presidium of the Albanian National Assembly honoured him by awarding the Order "Naim Frashëri"

In 1991 Gjirja was invited by the Swedish Institute and the Department of "Thermo and Fluid Dynamics" at Chalmers University of Technology to collaborate with other scientists on further research to develop methods of using ethanol as an alternative engine fuel. He is the author of several scientific publications and has participated in various international conferences. In 2012, on the occasion of the 100th anniversary of Albania's independence, the Town Hall of the Kavaja city honored him with the title of "City Gratitude". Another passion of Savo is his love for literature. He wrote his first poem at the age of 15.

== Books ==
- Savo Gjirja, "Hidrodinamika e Anijeve.", Shtëpia Botuese e Librit Universitar, Universiteti Politeknik, faqe 220, Tiranë, 1976. ("Ships Hydrodynamics.", University Books Publishing House, Polytechnic University, page 220, Tirana 1976).
- Savo Gjirja, "Dinamika dhe Konstruksioni i Lokomotivave.", Shtëpia Botuese e Librit Universitar, Universiteti Politeknik, faqe154, Tiranë, 1978. ("Dynamics and Construction of Locomotives.", University Books Publishing House, Polytechnic University, page154, Tirana, 1978.)
- Savo Gjirja, "Disa Efekte në Termodinamikën e Motorave.", Universiteti Politeknik, faqe186, Tiranë, 1979. ("Some Effects on Engines Thermodynamics.", Polytechnic University, page186, Tirana,1979.)
- Savo Gjirja, et al., "Bazat e Riparimit të Makinave." Shtëpia Botuese e Librit Shkollor, faqe 206, Tiranë, 1986. ("The Basics of Auto Repair.", School Books Publishing House, page 206, Tirana, 1986.)
- Savo Gjirja, "Hidrodinamika dhe Diagnostikimi i Sistemeve Mekanike.". Shtëpia Botuese e Librit Universitar, faqe 234, Tiranë,1987. ("Hydrodynamics and Mechanical Diagnosis Systems." University Books Publishing House, page 234, Tirana, 1987)
- Savo Gjirja, "Turbofryerja në Motorët me Djegie të Brendëshme." Shtëpia Botuese e Librit Universitar, faqe 90, Tiranë, 1988. ("Turbocharging in Internal Combustion Engines." University Books Publishing House, page 90, Tirana, 1988)
- Savo Gjirja, "Konstruksioni dhe Dinamika e Makinave.", Shtëpia Botuese e Librit Universitar, faqe 300, Tiranë 1989 ("The Construction and Vehicle Dynamics." University Books Publishing House, page 300, Tirana, 1989)
- Savo Gjirja, "Modelimi Matematik dhe Diagnostikimi i Proçeseve Motorikë." Shtëpia Botuese e Librit Universitar, faqe 136, Tiranë, 1990. ("Mathematical Modeling and Diagnostics on Engine Processes." University Books Publishing House, page 136, Tirana, 1990)
- Savo Gjirja, "Udhëzues Laboratorik në Motorët me Djegie të Brendëshme." Shtëpia Botuese e Librit Universitar, faqe 54, Tiranë 1990. ("Laboratory Tests on Internal Combustion Engines." University Books Publishing House, page 54, Tirana, 1990)
