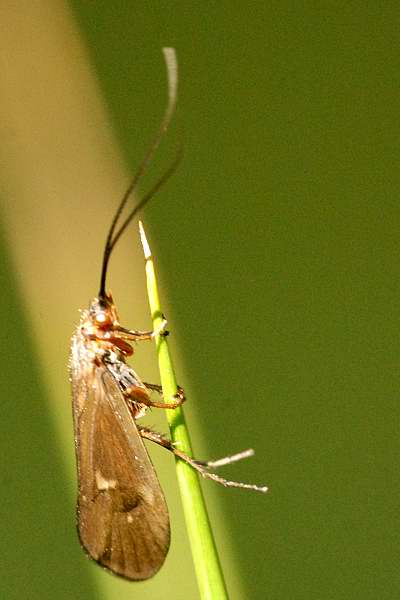
- Potamophylax nigricornis

Scientific classification
- Kingdom: Animalia
- Phylum: Arthropoda
- Clade: Pancrustacea
- Class: Insecta
- Order: Trichoptera
- Family: Limnephilidae
- Tribe: Stenophylacini
- Genus: Potamophylax; Wallengren, 1891

= Potamophylax =

Genus of insects

Potamophylax is a genus of insects belonging to the family Limnephilidae. The species of this genus are found in Europe and Northern America.

== Species ==
The following are included in BioLib.cz:

1. Potamophylax albergaria Malicky, 1976
2. Potamophylax borislavi Kumanski, 1975
3. Potamophylax carpathicus (Dziędzielewicz, 1912)
4. Potamophylax cingulatus (Stephens, 1837)
5. Potamophylax coronavirus Ibrahimi, Bilalli & Vitecek, 2021
6. Potamophylax gambaricus Malicky, 1971
7. Potamophylax goulandriorum Malicky, 1974
8. Potamophylax gurunaki Malicky, 1992
9. Potamophylax haidukorum Malicky, 1999
10. Potamophylax inermis Moretti & Cianficconi, 1994
11. Potamophylax juliani Kumanski, 1999
12. Potamophylax jungi Mey, 1976
13. Potamophylax latipennis (Curtis, 1834)
14. Potamophylax luctuosus (Piller & Mitterpacher, 1783)
15. Potamophylax millenii (Klapalek, 1899)
16. Potamophylax nigricornis (Pictet, 1834)
17. Potamophylax pallidus (Klapalek, 1899)
18. Potamophylax rotundipennis (Brauer, 1857)
19. Potamophylax schmidi Marinkovic-Gospodnetic, 1971
20. Potamophylax seprus J. Olah, O Lodovici & M Valle, 2011
21. Potamophylax winneguthi (Klapálek, 1902)
