= Astronomy Outreach of Kosovo =

Kosovan nonprofit organization

Astronomy Outreach of Kosovo is a non-governmental, nonprofit organization dedicated to research, public outreach, and political advocacy for projects related to astronomy, planetary science, and space exploration in Kosovo. The aim of the organization is to develop and build the first observatory and planetarium in Kosovo.

== History ==
The organization was founded in 2015 by Pranvera Hyseni. Hyseni has a B.A. degree in geography from the University of Pristina and is a student of Planetary Science at the University of California, Santa Cruz. Hyseni became interested in astronomy at a young age and founded the organization to spark interest among young people in Kosovo. Astronomy Outreach of Kosovo has worked with the Ministry of Education, Science and Technology in Kosovo on bringing lecturers to public schools across the country.

On 20 June 2024 (2 years ago), the National Observatory and Planetarium of Kosovo opened to the public. The facility is located about 32 km (20 mi) outside of Pristina.
