= Afërdita Veveçka Priftaj =

Albanian physicist

- Born: Afërdita Veveçka; 21 January 1948; Berat, Albania
- Died: 4 July 2017 (aged 69); Vienna, Austria
- Other names: Afërdita Priftaj Veveçka, Afërdita Veveçka
- Occupations: physicist, academic
- Years active: 1970–2017

Afërdita Veveçka Priftaj (21 January 1948 – 4 July 2017) was an Albanian physicist, associate of the Academy of Sciences of Albania and a professor at the Polytechnic University of Tirana. Her research specialized on metals, evaluating their microstructure and mechanical properties, and the effects of severe plastic deformation on nanocrystalline materials.

== Early life ==
Veveçka was born on 21 January 1948 in Berat, Albania. Raised in an intellectual family, she completed her undergraduate studies in physics at the University of Tirana in 1970. Appointed to lecture in physics faculty, she continued her own studies, earning a doctorate in 1982, with the thesis Studimi i ndryshimeve strukturore të aluminit dhe lidhjeve të tij, gjatë përpunimit termik e plastik, me anë të mikroskopisë elektronike (Study of structural changes in aluminum and its alloys, during thermal and plastic processing, by means of electronic microscopy).

== Career ==
In 1990, Veveçka was hired as a physics lecturer at the Polytechnic University of Tirana. Four years later, she was promoted to Associate Professor and in 1999 became a full professor. The focus of her teaching and research was in materials science, specifically regarding metals, and their microstructure and mechanical properties. Continuing her own studies at the University of Southern California in Los Angeles (1993), at the University of Cambridge (1994), KTH Royal Institute of Technology (1997–1998) and the University of Stavanger (2003), as well as other universities in Germany, Ireland, Italy and Poland, Veveçka studied the effects of severe plastic deformation on nanocrystalline materials. She coordinated scientific projects for the National Research and Development Program, participating in joint research projects between Albania and other countries, such as Austria, Greece, Italy and Slovenia. Among the projects she led were the Albanian-Greek Study of prehistoric copper objects from Albania and Greece and the Albanian-Italian study, Refining the grain size of metallic alloys by Equal Channel Angular Pressing.

Between 1995 and 2004, she served as an editor of the Materials Science and Engineering A. In 2008, she was elected as an associate of the Academy of Sciences of Albania and became an editor of the academy's journal, Journal of Natural and Technical Sciences. In 2012, she was selected as one of the experts evaluating joint activities criteria in the 6th session of the European Union's Trans-European Mobility Programme for University Studies (TEMPUS).

== Death and legacy ==
Veveçka died on 4 July 2017 in Vienna, Austria, after a severe illness.
