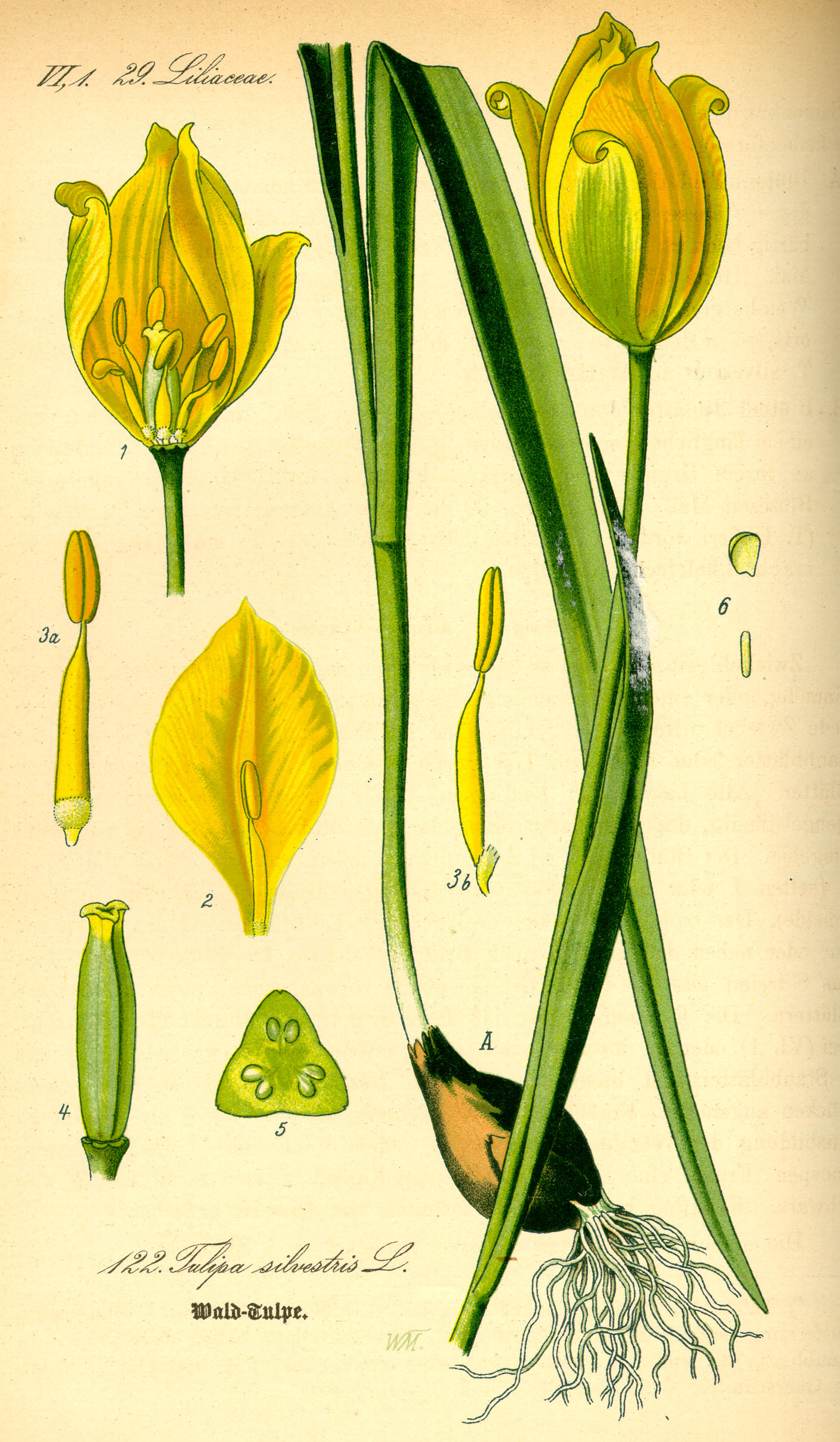
- 1885 illustration

Scientific classification
- Kingdom: Plantae
- Clade: Tracheophytes
- Clade: Angiosperms
- Clade: Monocots
- Order: Liliales
- Family: Liliaceae
- Subfamily: Lilioideae
- Tribe: Lilieae
- Genus: Tulipa
- Subgenus: Tulipa subg. Eriostemones
- Species: T. sylvestris

Binomial name
- Tulipa sylvestris L.

Synonyms
- Synonymy: Liriopogon sylvestre (L.) Raf.; Tulipa turcica Roth; Tulipa gallica Delaun. ex Loisel.; Tulipa aurea Raf.; Tulipa grisebachiana Pant.; Tulipa florentina Baker; Tulipa marshalliana Andrz. ex Baker; Tulipa grisebachii Borbás; Tulipa balcanica Velen.; Lilium bononiense E.H.L.Krause.; Tulipa abatinoi Borzí & Mattei; Tulipa grandiflora Hy; Tulipa primulina Baker, syn of subsp. primulina; Tulipa cuspidata Regel, syn of subsp. primulina; Tulipa elwesii Regel, syn of subsp. primulina; Tulipa australis Link, syn of subsp. australis; Tulipa pumila Moench, syn of subsp. australis; Tulipa celsiana Redouté, syn of subsp. australis; Tulipa transtagana Brot., syn of subsp. australis; Tulipa maculata Roth, syn of subsp. australis; Tulipa biebersteiniana Schult. & Schult.f., syn of subsp. australis; Tulipa patens C.Agardh, syn of subsp. australis; Tulipa tricolor Ledeb., syn of subsp. australis; Liriopogon celsianum (Redouté) Raf., syn of subsp. australis; Tulipa sibirica Patrin ex Kunth, syn of subsp. australis; Tulipa thirkeana K.Koch, syn of subsp. australis; Tulipa fragrans Munby, syn of subsp. australis; Tulipa alpestris Jord. & Fourr., syn of subsp. australis; Tulipa microgyna Baker, syn of subsp. australis; Tulipa caucasica Orph. ex Nyman, syn of subsp. australis; Tulipa callieri Halácsy & Levier, syn of subsp. australis; Tulipa bessarabica Zapal., syn of subsp. australis; Tulipa tchitounyi Azn., syn of subsp. australis; Tulipa tenuiscapa Pomel ex Batt., syn of subsp. australis; Tulipa paschalis Sennen, syn of subsp. australis; Tulipa hypanica Klokov & Zoz, syn of subsp. australis; Tulipa ophiophylla Klokov & Zoz, syn of subsp. australis; Tulipa quercetorum Klokov & Zoz, syn of subsp. australis; Tulipa samarica Klokov & Zoz, syn of subsp. australis; Tulipa sareptana Klokov & Zoz., syn of subsp. australis; Tulipa scythica Klokov & Zoz, syn of subsp. australis; Tulipa talijevii Klokov & Zoz, syn of subsp. australis; Tulipa valerii Zoz & Klokov, syn of subsp. australis; Tulipa graniticola (Klokov & Zoz) Klokov, syn of subsp. australis; Tulipa riparia Knjaz., Kulikov & E.G.Philippov, syn of subsp. australis; plus numerous other names at the level of subspecies, variety, or form

= Tulipa sylvestris =

Species of flowering plant

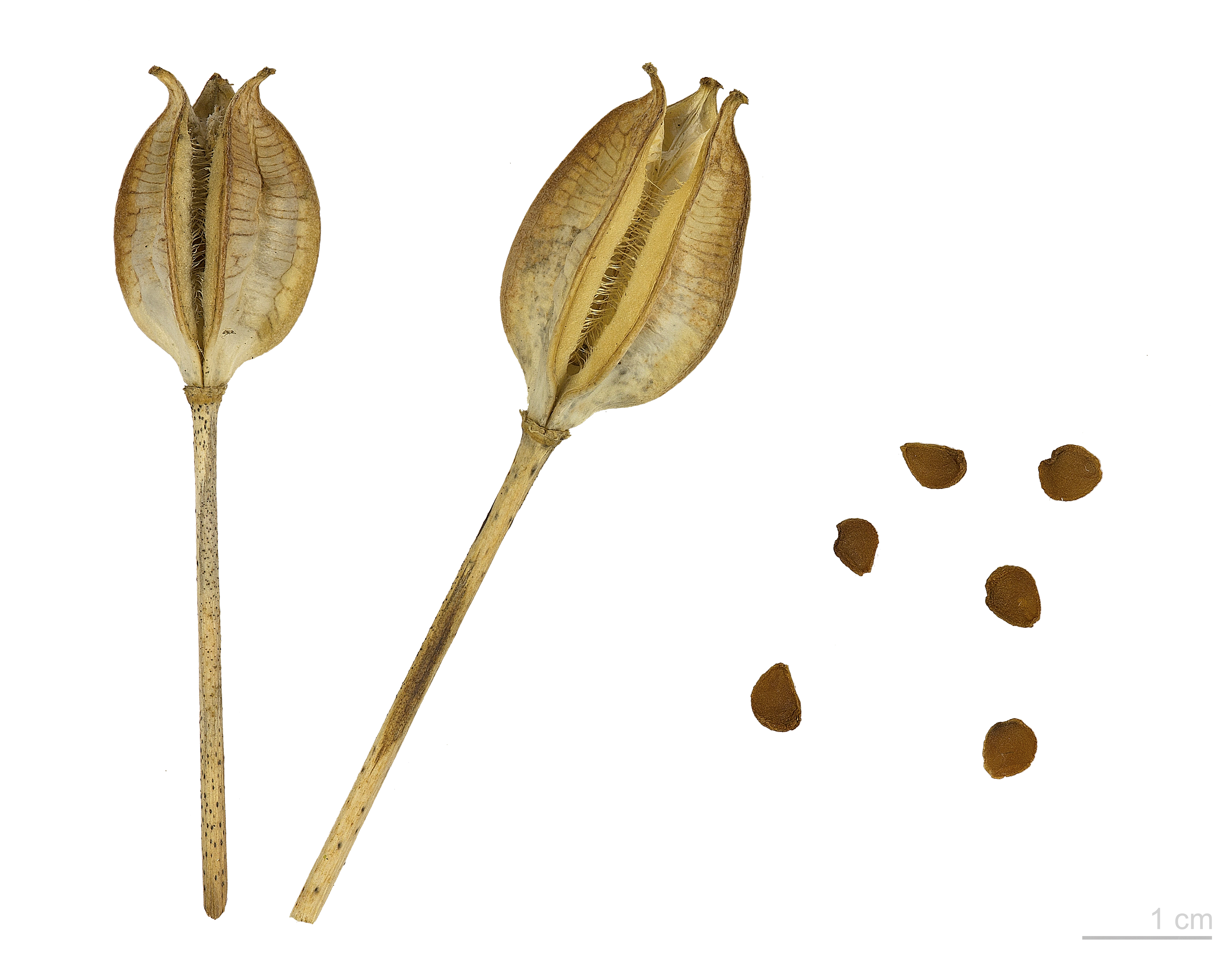
Tulipa sylvestris - MHNT

Tulipa sylvestris, the wild tulip or woodland tulip, is a Eurasian and North African species of wild tulip, a plant in the lily family. Its native range extends from Portugal and Morocco to western China, covering most of the Mediterranean and Black Sea Basins, and Central Asia. The species is also cultivated as an ornamental and naturalized in central and northern Europe as well as a few scattered locations in North America. It was first recorded as being naturalised in Britain in the late 17th century.

== Description ==
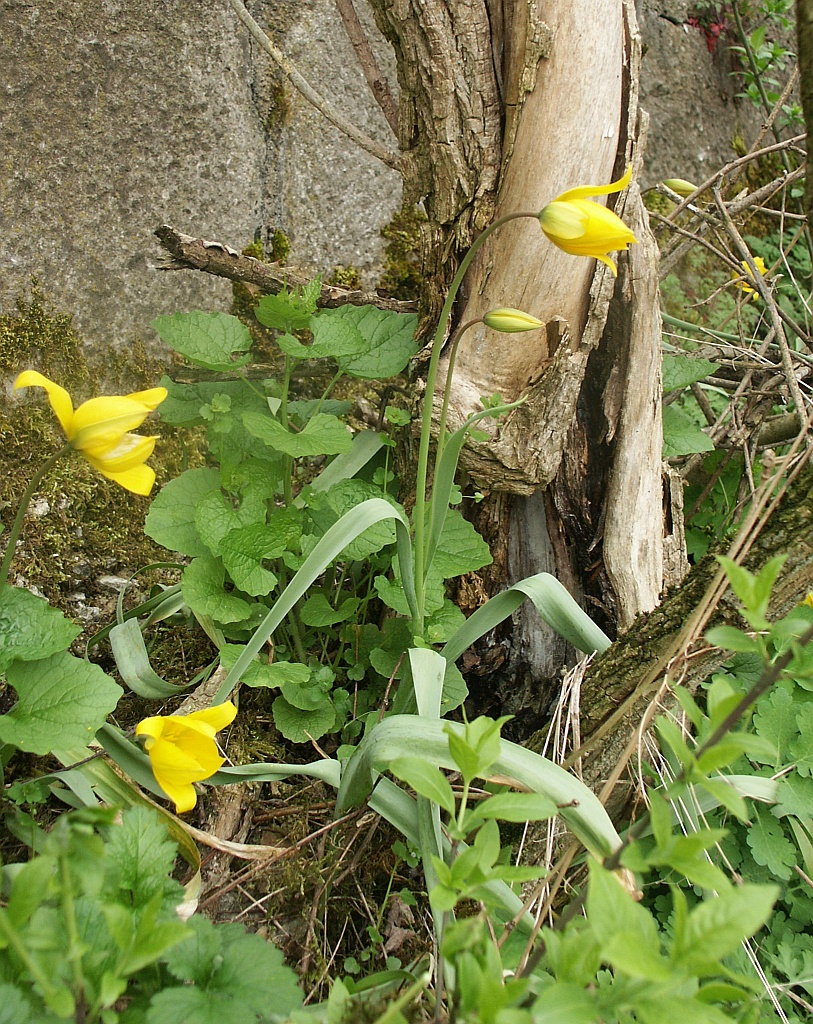
Tulipa sylvestris

It is a bulb-forming perennial, with narrow blue-grey leaves and usually with 1 or 2 flowers per stem. The stem can reach up to 50 cm (20 in) tall. The scented blooms appear between April and May, and the yellow flowers are sometimes tinged red on the outside.

They rarely produce seed and are pollinated by small insects.

=== Biochemicals ===
Some tuliposides – a family of biochemicals – found in Tulipa sylvestris include:

- 6-tuliposide A and B
- Tuliposide D
- Tulipalin A and B

=== Subspecies ===
There are three T. sylvestris subspecies:

- Tulipa sylvestris subsp. australis ((Link) Pamp) – from Portugal and Morocco to Xinjiang
- Tulipa sylvestris subsp. primulina ((Baker) Maire & Weiller) – Algeria, Morocco
- Tulipa sylvestris subsp. sylvestris – Italy, Libya

Tulipa australis is also found on the island of Malta, in the Mediterranean Sea, limited to one specific area.

== Habitat ==
It is found in dry grassy places and in woodland copses.
