= Potamophylax juliani =

Scientific classification
- Kingdom: Animalia
- Phylum: Arthropoda
- Clade: Pancrustacea
- Class: Insecta
- Order: Trichoptera
- Family: Limnephilidae
- Genus: Potamophylax
- Species: P. juliani

Binomial name
- Potamophylax juliani Kumanski, 1999

Species of caddisfly

Potamophylax juliani is a species of caddisfly in the family Limnephilidae. It was first described in 1999. Females are brachypterous. The species is usually found in Bulgaria.
