= Mary Gibbs =

Mary Gibbs may refer to:

- Mary Gibbs (conservationist) (1879–1983), American park superintendent and conservationist
- Mary Gibbs (actress) (born 1996), American actress
- Mary Elizabeth Gibbs (1836–1920), New Zealand homemaker and community leader

== See also ==
- Mary Gibbs and Jesse H. Jones Reflection Pool, American reflecting pool
