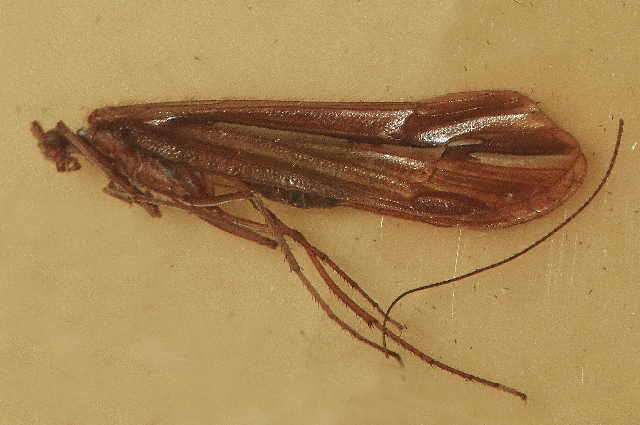

Scientific classification
- Kingdom: Animalia
- Phylum: Arthropoda
- Clade: Pancrustacea
- Class: Insecta
- Order: Trichoptera
- Family: Limnephilidae
- Tribe: Chilostigmini
- Genus: Psychoglypha
- Species: P. subborealis

Binomial name
- Psychoglypha subborealis (Banks, 1924)

= Psychoglypha subborealis =

Species of caddisfly

Psychoglypha subborealis is a species of northern caddisfly in the family Limnephilidae. It is found in North America.
