= Frenesia difficilis =

Scientific classification
- Kingdom: Animalia
- Phylum: Arthropoda
- Clade: Pancrustacea
- Class: Insecta
- Order: Trichoptera
- Family: Limnephilidae
- Tribe: Chilostigmini
- Genus: Frenesia
- Species: F. difficilis

Binomial name
- Frenesia difficilis (Walker, 1852)

Synonyms
- Frenesia coagulata (Provancher, 1877); Frenesia pallida (Banks, 1899); Limnephilus difficilis Walker, 1852

Species of caddisfly

Frenesia difficilis is a species of northern caddisfly in the family Limnephilidae. It is found in North America.
