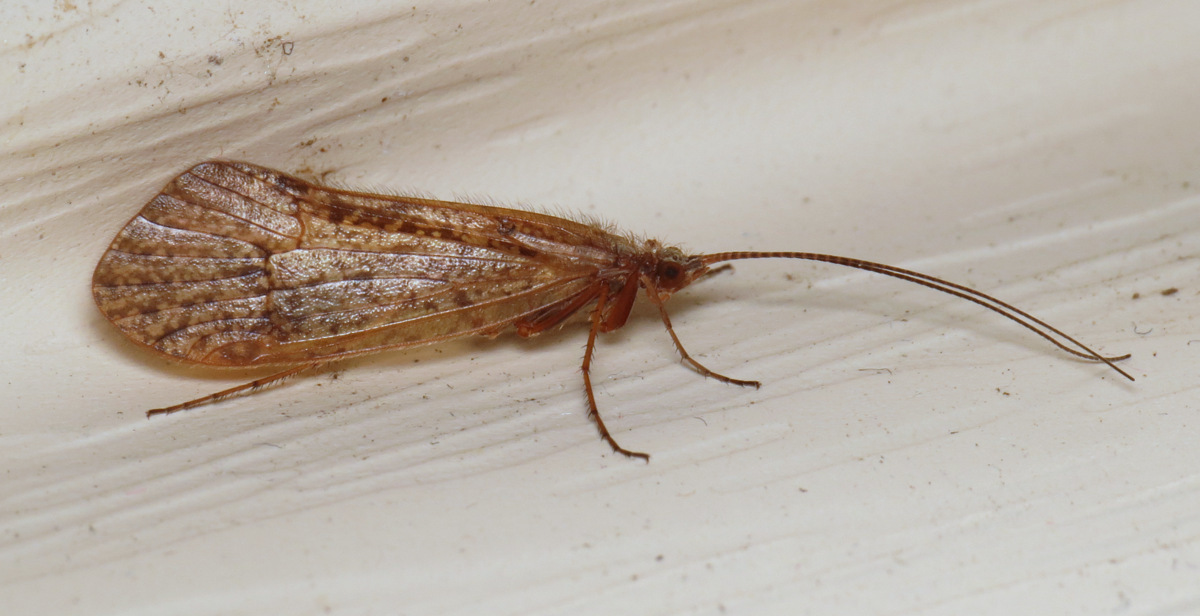

Scientific classification
- Kingdom: Animalia
- Phylum: Arthropoda
- Clade: Pancrustacea
- Class: Insecta
- Order: Trichoptera
- Family: Limnephilidae
- Tribe: Chilostigmini
- Genus: Frenesia
- Species: F. missa

Binomial name
- Frenesia missa (Milne, 1935)

Synonyms
- Chilostigma missum Milne, 1935

= Frenesia missa =

Species of caddisfly

Frenesia missa is a species of northern caddisfly in the family Limnephilidae. It is found in North America.
