= Desmona bethula =

Scientific classification
- Domain: Eukaryota
- Kingdom: Animalia
- Phylum: Arthropoda
- Class: Insecta
- Order: Trichoptera
- Family: Limnephilidae
- Tribe: Chilostigmini
- Genus: Desmona
- Species: D. bethula

Binomial name
- Desmona bethula Denning, 1954

Species of caddisfly

Desmona bethula, the amphibious caddisfly, is a species of northern caddisfly in the family Limnephilidae. It is found in North America.
