= Psychoglypha avigo =

Scientific classification
- Kingdom: Animalia
- Phylum: Arthropoda
- Clade: Pancrustacea
- Class: Insecta
- Order: Trichoptera
- Family: Limnephilidae
- Tribe: Chilostigmini
- Genus: Psychoglypha
- Species: P. avigo

Binomial name
- Psychoglypha avigo (Ross, 1941)

Synonyms
- Glyphopsyche avigo Ross, 1941

Species of caddisfly

Psychoglypha avigo is a species of northern caddisfly in the family Limnephilidae. It can be found in North America.
