= Chilostigma =

Scientific classification
- Kingdom: Animalia
- Phylum: Arthropoda
- Clade: Pancrustacea
- Class: Insecta
- Order: Trichoptera
- Family: Limnephilidae
- Subfamily: Limnephilinae
- Tribe: Chilostigmini
- Genus: Chilostigma; McLachlan, 1876

Species
- Chilostigma itascae; Chilostigma ostracoderma; Chilostigma pumilium; Chilostigma sieboldi

Genus of caddisflies

Chilostigma is a genus of caddisflies in the family Limnephilidae. All of its members are found in Scandinavia and Finland, apart from Chilostigma itascae, which has only been reported from the U.S. state of Minnesota, and Chilostigma sieboldi, which is known from both European localities and Hokkaido in Japan. Other North American species were formerly placed in this genus.

The four known species are:

- Chilostigma itascae Wiggins 1975
- Chilostigma ostracoderma Bradley 1924
- Chilostigma sieboldi McLachlan 1876
- Chilostigma pumilium (Hochstetter)
