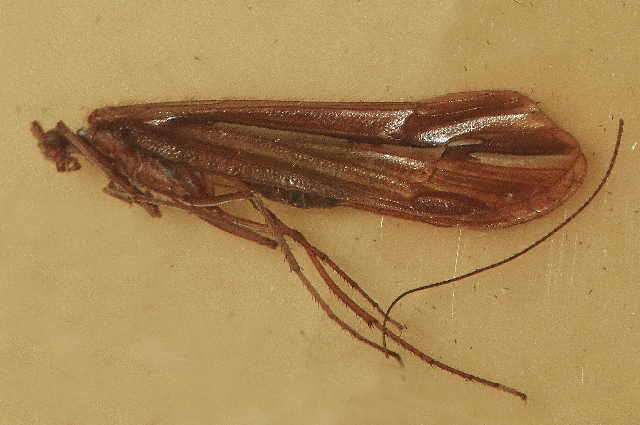
- Psychoglypha subborealis

Scientific classification
- Kingdom: Animalia
- Phylum: Arthropoda
- Clade: Pancrustacea
- Class: Insecta
- Order: Trichoptera
- Family: Limnephilidae
- Subfamily: Limnephilinae
- Tribe: Chilostigmini
- Genus: Psychoglypha; Ross, 1944

= Psychoglypha =

Genus of caddisflies

Psychoglypha is a genus of northern caddisflies in the family Limnephilidae. There are about 14 described species in Psychoglypha.

== Species ==
These 14 species belong to the genus Psychoglypha:

- Psychoglypha alascensis (Banks, 1900)
- Psychoglypha avigo (Ross, 1941)
- Psychoglypha bella (Banks, 1903)
- Psychoglypha browni Denning, 1970
- Psychoglypha klamathi Denning, 1970
- Psychoglypha leechi Denning, 1970
- Psychoglypha mazamae Denning, 1970
- Psychoglypha ormiae (Ross, 1938)
- Psychoglypha prita (Milne, 1935)
- Psychoglypha rossi Schmid, 1952
- Psychoglypha schmidi Nimmo, 1965
- Psychoglypha schuhi Denning, 1970
- Psychoglypha smithi Denning, 1970
- Psychoglypha subborealis (Banks, 1924)
