= Queen Bee (ship) =

1852 barque that ran aground on Farewell Spit, New Zealand in 1877

Coordinates: 40°30′00″S 172°52′00″E

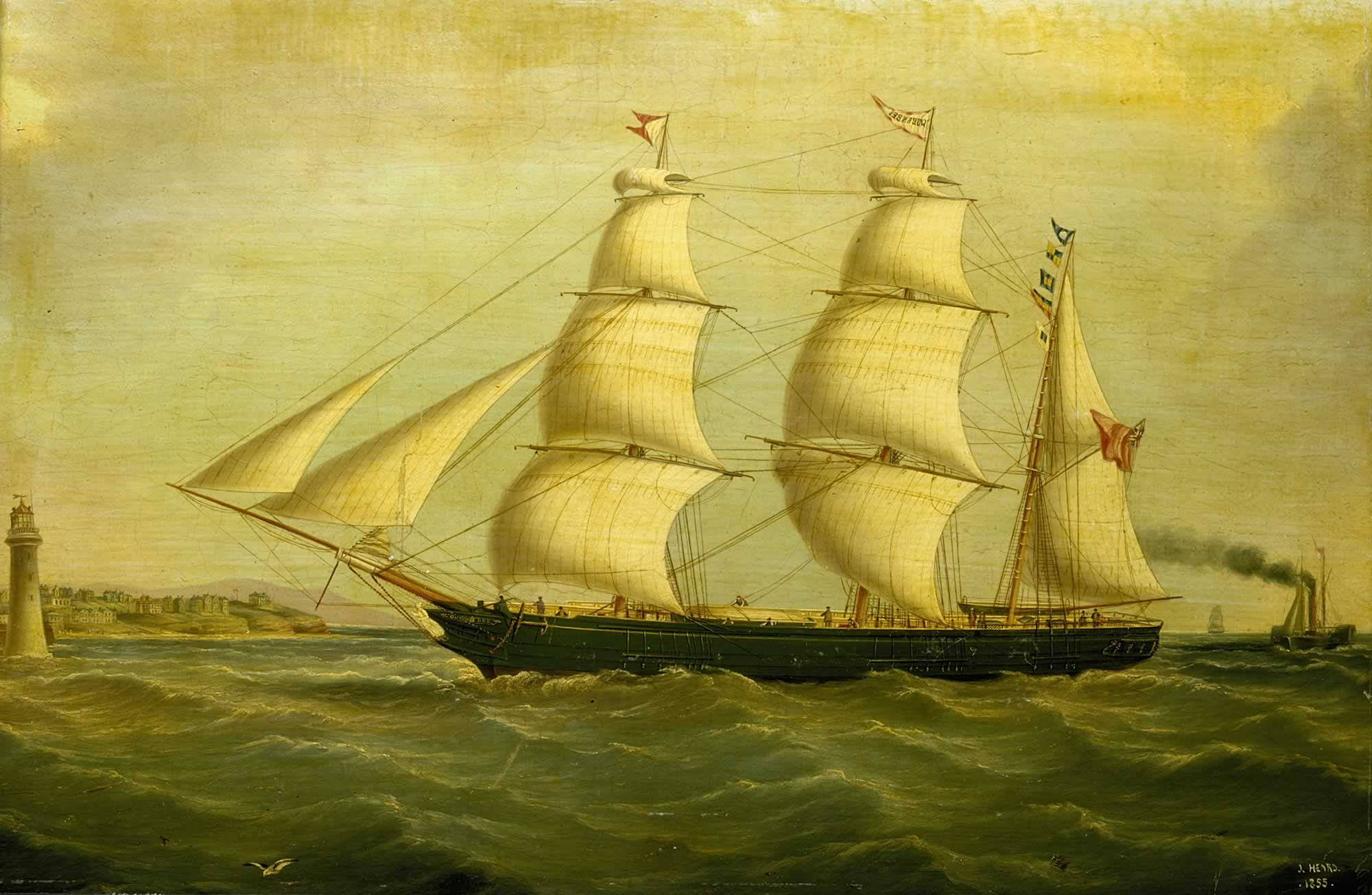
- The barque Queen Bee, built in Sunderland

History

United Kingdom
- Name: Queen Bee
- Owner: Shaw Savill and Co
- Port of registry: Port of London
- Builder: Leslie & Co - built in Sunderland
- Launched: 1859
- Fate: Ran aground on Farewell Spit at about midnight on Monday, 6 August 1877 and subsequently broke up

General characteristics
- Class & type: Ship
- Tonnage: 726 tons

The Queen Bee was a ship, constructed in Sunderland and launched in 1859. It was used primarily for transporting immigrants from England to New Zealand, having made about 11 journeys before grounding on Farewell Spit in 1877.

Lloyd's Register includes three vessels named Queen Bee around this time - a barque of 310 tons and launched in 1853, a barque of 358 tons and launched in 1862, and this Queen Bee, a ship of 726 tons and launched in 1859. They were all constructed in Sunderland.

== Journeys ==
Departed	Date	Arrived	Date	Captain	Passengers
London		Adelaide	5 March 1865		
London	1 October 1868	Auckland	8 January 1869	Leslie	98
London	22 October 1870	Auckland	26 December 1870	E G Dent	108
London	16 July 1872	Auckland	26 October 1872	E Williams	100

== Final journey ==
=== London to Farewell Spit ===
The Queen Bee sailed from London, England, for Nelson, New Zealand, on 21 April 1877 with a large cargo and 30 passengers bound for Nelson, New Zealand and then Napier, New Zealand. It cleared The Downs on 24 April. The ship sighted Madeira on 9 May.

According to its captain, J S Davies, everything went well on the journey, with the officers, passengers, and crew getting on well together. They had light winds to the Cape of Good Hope, but then encountered strong winds and heavy gales as it sailed along the 45th parallel until the ship was off Tasmania on 27 July. From there until it reached New Zealand it had northerly winds. At one stage on its journey, prior to 24 July, it was sighted and spoken to by the Thistle. The Queen Bee sighted New Zealand just north of Milford Sound on Thursday, 2 August. Sailing up the west coast of the South Island against the wind was difficult.

By 4 August the Nelson papers were expressing an element of concern about the late arrival of the Queen Bee stating "At this season of the year it is a very difficult job to make a landlocked port". At 8 pm on Monday, 6 August the Queen Bee was abreast Farewell Spit, and sighted the light at about 8:30 pm. Because the weather was favourable she at first maintained her course and then steered SSE to ½ east.

=== Grounding ===
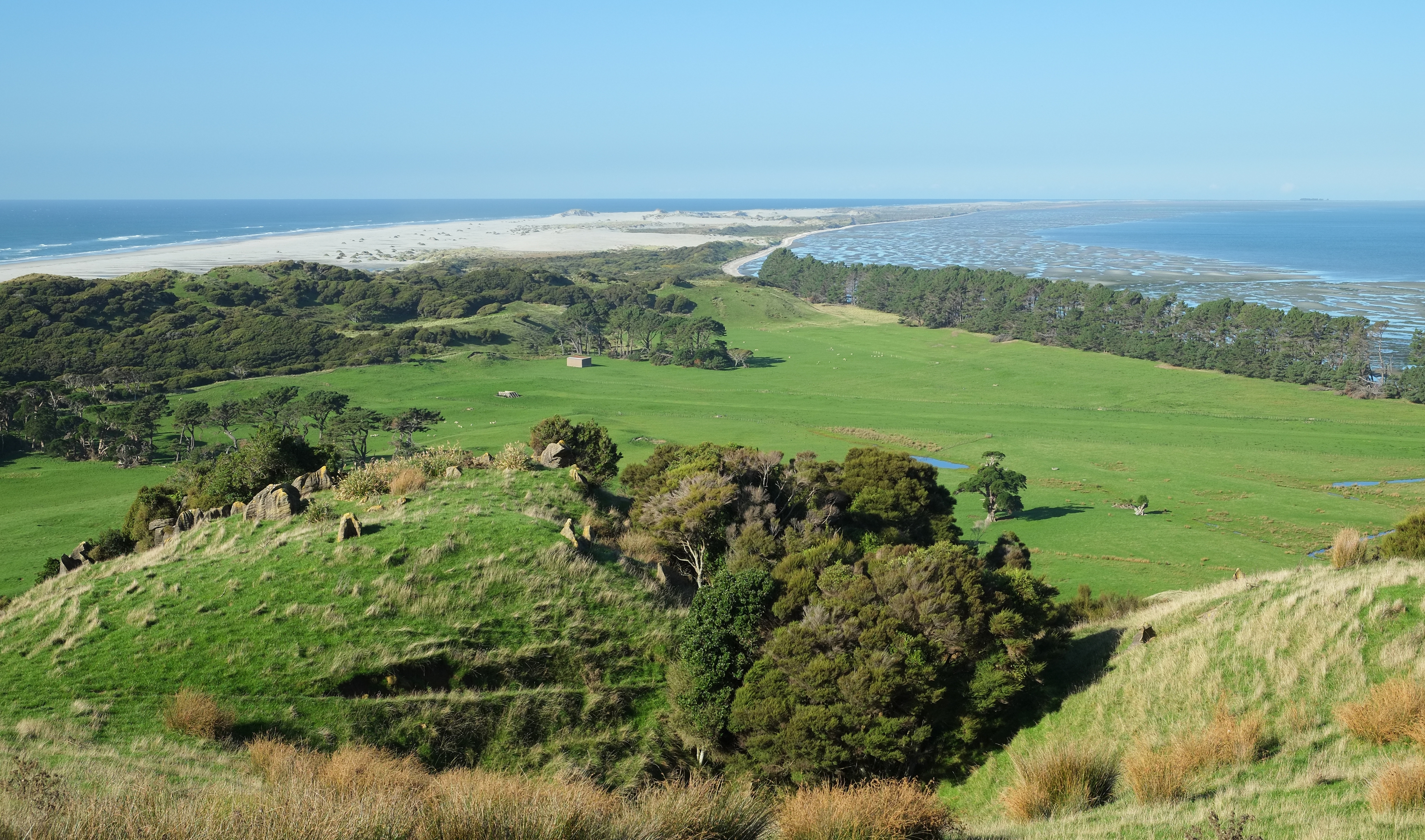
Farewell Spit

At midnight Farewell Spit was bearing north-west and showing red when the Queen Bee struck about 6 to 8 miles from the lighthouse. The ship came up hard. The Captain tried backing the yards but was unable to unground her. Soundings were taken in the hold and found 4 ft 6 deep in water. Later the Second Mate attributed the grounding to an error with the compasses. The problem with the ship's compasses was also raised by the Captain and Chief Officer at the subsequent wreck enquiry.

Despite their difficulty, all remained calm. The crew then fired guns, launched rockets, and burnt blue lights to attract attention from the shore. They obtained no response. At 3.45 pm, the Captain then ordered the second mate take the dingy with four men to seek assistance. After calling in at Bark Bay, where they were helped by Messrs Huffam and Hadfield, the boat proceeded to Motueka. At 8am on 7 August, in heavy seas, all the remaining passengers and crew commenced abandoning the Queen Bee in the lifeboat, cutter, and captain's gig.

=== Abandonment ===
At launch the lifeboat was damaged and needed to be continuously bailed out to keep it afloat. The lifeboat took Mrs Gibbs and three of her children, Mrs Pearce, Miss Sanders, Mrs Cheel and three of her children, together with these were four seamen. It headed for Awaroa with the women bailing out water. A blanket was hoisted as a sail.

The cutter took Dr and Mrs Maunsell and their two children, both Fosberry's, Mr Gibbs and five of his children, Mr Whyte, Master Hartell, Mr and Master Cheel, Messrs Barnes, Charington, Wills (a seamen), and a man named Furness, who was a stowaway. For a time the cutter and lifeboat sailed together, then parted with the cutter sailing to leeward.

In the captain's gig, and on a raft the crew had constructed, were Captain J. S. Davies, Mr Baillie (chief officer) Mr W. H. Mason (third officer), the boatswain, carpenter, three stewards, two cooks, the butcher, one able body seaman, and Messrs Hilliard and Beckett, passengers. It was the last to leave at 4 pm and was to head for Collingwood towing the raft. The boats only contained a little water, because the heavy seas had made loading impossible.

=== Raising the alarm ===
At 7:48 pm on Tuesday, 7 August the Second Mate, John E Going, sent a telegram from Motueka to the Nelson Harbour Master, Captain James S Cross advising the ship had struck Farewell Spit. The Harbour Master set sail for the Spit on the steamer Lady Barkly followed by the steamer Lyttleton. The Kennedy was thought to have been already at the scene, but later reports stated that it had not sighted the Queen Bee.

The Lady Barkly arrived first. Captain Cross, went on board Queen Bee and found it abandoned except for four dogs and a cat. The animals are believed to have subsequently drowned. After the arrival of the Lyttleton Captains Cross, Walker, and Scott, and Mr Ross, the engineer of the Lady Barkly, surveyed the Queen Bee and condemned it as a total wreck. It was submerged with the exception of a portion of the starboard quarter, and a small part of the forecastle. Her hatches were burst open, and the cargo was washing out and floating about in all directions.

While the Lady Barkly was at the Queen Bee, the lifeboat reached Awaroa, where the occupants were assisted by the Hadfield brothers. After a short time they were picked up by the schooner Merlin. From it, they were transhipped to the Lady Barkly. Stopping at Motueka, the Lady Barkly picked up the sailors who had raised the alarm and then sailed back to Nelson, arriving on 8 August. The whereabouts of the cutter and the gig were unknown.

=== The journey of the captain's gig ===
During the night of 7 August the gig had sailed towards d'Urville and Stephen's Islands. These they sighted at daybreak on 8 August. On attempting to land in a small cove the gig was destroyed. The ship's carpenter was lost and presumed drowned during the landing, but everyone else made it ashore safely. Once ashore Mr Hilliard, a passenger, attempted to climb the hill surrounding the cove, but fell badly injuring his feet. At high tide the water almost covered the cove. A fire was lit on the morning of the 9th using driftwood, wet matches provided by the steward and the mates burning glass. Water was found but no food.

=== The search ===
After two hours in port, on 8 August, the Lady Barkly left Nelson to resume the search, intending to head for the Croixelles and then across Tasman Bay / Te Tai-o-Aorere. The Lyttelton returned at 3 am on 9 August having remained at sea searching for the missing boats. It, too, had had no success. The Lyttelton set sail again that morning under Captain Whitwell to resume the search. The Lyttelton intended to search for the next two to three days, or until the missing boats were found. The Lady Barkly returned to port.

The Nelson Collector of Customs sought Wellington steamers, including the Manawatu, to be sent into Cook Strait and Stephens Island to join the search. T.R.H. Taylor and the rescued sailors from the Queen Bee set sail to search d'Urville's Island and then the bays, and the Nelson Naval Brigade's boat Aurora under Lieutenants Gully and Simpson also left with the Lady Barkly to search around d'Urville's Island.

The wreck was put up for auction by Messrs Sharp and Pickering at 11 am on 9 August 1877 on instruction from the Nelson Lloyds agent, Messrs Curtis Brothers. Neither the ship nor its cargo were insured.

Meanwhile, at D'Urville Island, the survivors from the gig had sighted smoke from several ships, but been unable to alert them. Mr Mason, the third mate, managed to climb out of the cove and headed inland to try to get help. The night was fine, but the morning of Friday, 10 August brought rain and wind. The Lyttelton was sighted off shore at about 2 pm, but they could not attract its attention. Just then the Manawatu came into sight, saw them and hoisted a signal flag. All those who remained in the cove were taken on board the Manawatu to Nelson.

=== The journey of the cutter ===
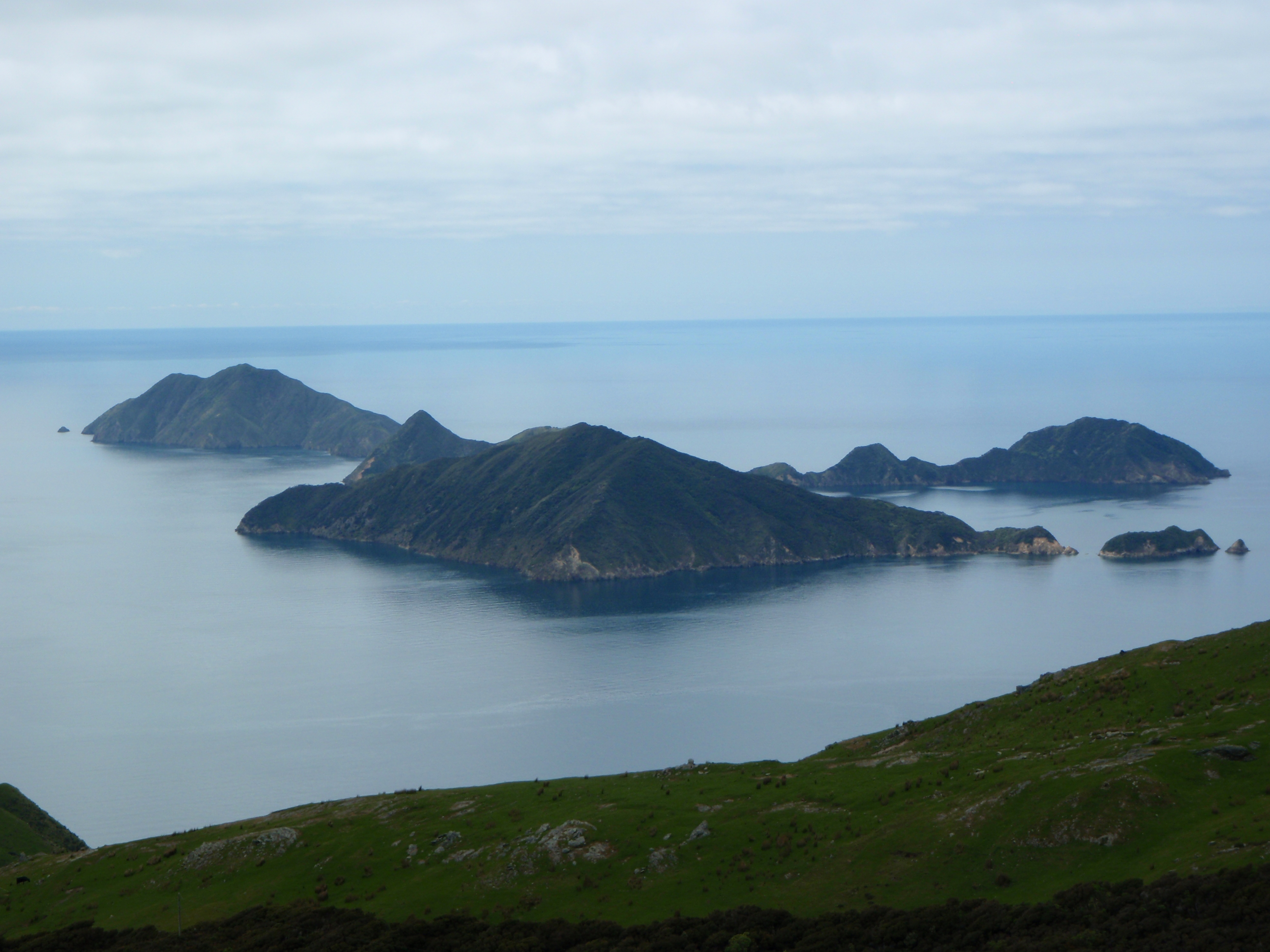
Rangitoto Island, near French Pass

At 10.34 am on Saturday, 11 August Lieut. Simpson from the Aurora telegraphed from Cable Bay that the cutter and all on board had been located safe and well at French Pass. When those on the cutter left the Queen Bee on the 7th they found that they only had three oars, which were almost useless, no sails or mast, a bottle of water and three tins of preserved meat. The boat was overloaded and so they attempted to catch the lifeboat to transfer some of the people. After struggling for an hour and a half they turned to run before the sea, being blown seaward. The cutter was constantly taking on water, but fortunately the wind shifted to the north west. Making a sail from a rug held on with a brass rod, they managed to row and sail to Savage Point, just above French Pass. On the night of the 7th they remained at sea near the mouth of Puna Harbour. The next morning at daybreak they landed on the beach, made a fire and boiled water. Some of the crew went in search of help and came across the Maori settlement of Rene Hoihoi on Rangitoto Island where they were treated with great hospitality. The remained at Puna Harbour until the 9th when they rowed to Mr A Elmslie's place at French Pass. From there the people from the cutter were taken by the Aurora and a Maori boat to Nelson.

The Aurora arrived back in Nelson at about 4:30 pm on 11 August. A large crowd, including the Military Band playing Home Sweet Home, gathered to welcome them back. The Maori boat arrived at 7 pm. The butcher, F Gutherlest, returned on the Lady Barkly a little later.

The Lyttelton and HMS Sappho, under Captain Digby, in the meantime had landed 25 of their crews on D'urville Island to try to find the missing third mate, Mr Mason. Messrs T R Taylor and H Walmsley had been searching the island for him since 11 August. After a fairly widespread search he was located tired and exhausted.

=== The enquiry ===
An enquiry into the wreck was commenced on 16 August under Resident Magistrate Lowther Broad Esq and Captain R Johnston, Nautical Assessor. It concluded on 22 August, with judgements against the captain, first mate, and second mate. The enquiry found that there was poor navigation, no soundings were taken when they knew they were close to land, and a poor lookout was kept. The captain's licence was suspended for three years, and the second mate's for six months.

A relief fund was set up for the survivors, with 100 pounds being sent to the widow of the ship's carpenter, the only person to lose their life.

Captain Davies did not appear to have been a good seaman, for a few years later in July 1873 as captain of the Dallam Tower he ran into an Indian Ocean cyclone. His actions in failing to heave the ship earlier on encountering the storm almost caused its loss. Those on board credited the actions of the first mate, George Donald McDonald, in saving the ship. McDonald had, on one occasion, been at the wheel for a thirty-hour stretch. Davies was replaced as captain on his return to England.

=== Crew ===
Captain: John Sayer Davies, Chief Officer: Arthur Hessen Baillie, Masters Certificate from 1852 Boatswain: Carpenter: Chief Steward: Alexander Gardner Stewards: 2 Cooks: 2 Butcher: F Gutherlest 1st Mate: ? 2nd Mate: John Ernest Going, Masters Certificate from 1875 3rd Mate: William Henry Mason Able body Seamen: 5 Seaman: John Willis, John Price, Oscar Frank, Edward Williamson, Martin Wardrope, and 1 others

=== Ship's manifest ===
The ship's manifest stated the following load:

4 bales flour bags, 10 cases Van Houten cocoa, 30 bundle spades, 42 cases galvanised corrugated iron, 1 bale seaming twine, 150 cases Hennessy's brandy, 2 crates brownware, 3 casks china, 15 cases marmalade, 10 kegs split peas, 50 kegs patent wrought nails, 50 cases Tenant's ale (quarts), 10,000 Countess slates, 9 cases glass, 10 quarter-casks sherry, 60 camp ovens, 150 grindstones, 20 barrels tar and pitch, 20 quarter-casks pale brandy, 50 cases Blood's stout (quarts), 50 cases Pig brand stout (quarts), 10 cases Bath bricks, 40 casks whiting, 1 cases gauge glasses, 11 rolls sheet lead, 1050 sash weights, 23 kegs shot, 25 boxes tin plates, 2 iron tanks raisins, 10 casks shell almonds, 10 casks barcelona nuts, 5 casks walnuts, 2 cases Jordan almonds, 50 barrels currants, 3 cases sultanas, 1 case Sollazzi liquorice, 4 cases scythe stones, 1 cask scythes, 50 kegs Hall's sporting and blasting powder, 16 cases Curtis and Harvey's sporting powder, 30 quarter-casks vinegar, 3 cases Huntley and Palmer's biscuits, 10 bales cornsacks, 20 cases cocoa, 6 cases blacking, 20 cases Worcester sauce, 1 case percussion caps, 10 cases red herrings, 4 cases scented soap, 250 boxes candles, 10 cases' bedstead, 3 casks soft soap, 5 cases acid, 2 cases cream of tartar, 10 cases bottled fruits, 2 cases pimento, 2 cases maccaroni, 40 kegs seed, 50 cases Lome whisky, 20 cases corn flour, 95 packages drapery, 50 cases Meukow brandy, 30 cases claret, 160 kegs paint, 6 bundles castings, "N. Edwards & Co"; 20 cases and 10 casks currants, 17 crates and 5 casks glass and earthenware, 4 cases gunpowder, 200 boxes candles, 200 bags salt, 12 casks and 10 jars vinegar, 65 drums oil, 35 casks sulphur, 20 boxes starch, 11 cases confectionery, 28 cases oilman's.stores, 11 packages paints, 3 cases hose and belting, 5 bales paper, 4 crates bottles, 40 cases salmon, 3 cases leather, 6 cases clothing, 37 packages hardware, 120 coils wire, 50 axles, 42 grindstones, 650 bars iron, 18 kegs nails, 4000 feet iron pipes, 23 packages merchandise, "E. Buxton and Co"; 2599 packages, "Sclanders and Co"; 311 packages, "City Council"; 677 packages, "H. Davis & Co"; 13 packages, "W. 0. Wilkins"; 3 packages, "W. Darby"; 54 packages, "R.Mackay"; 11 packages, "Lightband and Co" 11 packages, "W. Milner"; 11 packages, "Lucas and Sons"; 11 packages, "J. Hounsell"; 45 packages, "H. Hounsell"; 24 packages, "Franzen"; 9 packages, "Johns"; 14 packages, "Nelson Hospital"; 2 packages, "Burnett"; I case, "Rev. Martin"; 3 cases, "Rev. Mother St. Michael"; 1 case, "Spencer"; 1 case, "Frater"; 1 box, "Greville"; 1 case, "Mrs Morton"; 2 packages, "Jennings"; 2 boxes, "Franklyn"; 1 case, "Cassidy"; 1 case, "Coward"; 2 packages, "Fell"; 1 case, "Cowling"; 1 package, "Fell and Atkinson"; 7 packages, "Hodder and Co"; 4 greyhounds, "Chatteris"; 1 case, "Adams"; 26 packages, "Gibbs"; 1 case, "T. Whitwell"; 3 casks paints, "J. P. Cooke"; 169 packages tubes, plates, & c, "Anchor Foundry"; and 423 packages, "Order"

=== Passengers ===
The number of passengers was first reported as 16 – possibly because only the adults were counted. Later reports ranged from 30 to 50 passengers. The list from the Colonist names 30.

"Saloon:" Mrs J Gibbs, Mary Gibbs, Richard Gibbs, Louisa Gibbs, Frederick Gibbs, Sidney Gibbs, Ellen J Gibbs, John H Gibbs, Henry E Gibbs, Lucy F Gibbs, C J Beckett, Earnest Catt, W A Whyte, H Hartle, Dr Maunsell, Mary Maunsell, Mirial Maunsell, Eily Maunsell, Eva C Fosberry, Emma Fosberry, and H H Hilliard.

"Steerage:" Elizabeth Pearce, Mary A Sanders, Charles W Cheel, Eliza Cheel, Elizabeth Cheel, Grace Cheel, Diana Cheel, William Cheel, and Ann Cheel.

There was also one stowaway, a Mr Furness.
