= Desmona =

Scientific classification
- Kingdom: Animalia
- Phylum: Arthropoda
- Clade: Pancrustacea
- Class: Insecta
- Order: Trichoptera
- Family: Limnephilidae
- Subfamily: Limnephilinae
- Tribe: Chilostigmini
- Genus: Desmona; Denning, 1954

Genus of caddisflies

Desmona is a genus of northern caddisflies in the family Limnephilidae. There are at least two described species in Desmona.

== Species ==
These two species belong to the genus Desmona:

- Desmona bethula Denning, 1954 (amphibious caddisfly)
- Desmona mono (Denning, 1970)
