= Phanocelia =

Scientific classification
- Kingdom: Animalia
- Phylum: Arthropoda
- Clade: Pancrustacea
- Class: Insecta
- Order: Trichoptera
- Family: Limnephilidae
- Tribe: Chilostigmini
- Genus: Phanocelia; Banks, 1943
- Species: P. canadensis

Binomial name
- Phanocelia canadensis (Banks, 1924)

Genus of caddisflies

Phanocelia is a genus of northern caddisflies in the family Limnephilidae. There is one described species in Phanocelia, P. canadensis.
