= Henry Widenham Maunsell =

Henry Widenham Maunsell (born in Dublin, County Dublin, Ireland on 22 February 1845, died 21 February 1895) was an early colonial surgeon, first in Australia (briefly) and then in New Zealand where his skilled and innovative surgery gained both national and international recognition. His untimely death in London at the age of 49, from influenza, ended an outstanding career.

At a time when surgery was limited by the twin fears of shock and infection, Maunsell was among the first to use the antiseptic technique newly introduced by Joseph Lister, and to operate for internal disorders of the pelvis, abdomen, skull and brain. Among his original contributions was a technique for excising bowel tumours and joining the cut ends to restore continuity. He also originated a flap method of amputating the tongue and a new technique for cleft palate operation in which he used woodcarver’s tools when reconstructing the bony defect in the hard palate. He also undertook a world-first operation on the hind brain (cerebellum) to relieve pressure from a life-threatening expanding cyst.

== Background and early career ==
Henry Maunsell and his future wife Mary Fosbery were from long-established Anglo-Irish Protestant families originally based near Limerick. Maunsell was born in Dublin and educated at Trinity College Dublin. In 1867 he was second in his graduating class, and then passed the surgical MRCS in London. With his parents and 2 sisters he emigrated to Melbourne, Australia and was appointed Resident Surgeon at the then-named Melbourne Hospital. Senior Surgeon William Gilbee gave the first report in Australia or NZ on Lister’s new method of antiseptic surgery, writing “...I am indebted to Dr Maunsell, my Resident Surgeon, who carefully carried out all the instructions laid down by Mr Lister”

== The move to New Zealand ==
The discovery of gold near the New Zealand town of Hokitika in 1865 resulted in major growth of the town and port. Maunsell was appointed Surgeon Superintendent of the Spit Hospital at £500 pa., and in October 1869 replaced Dr J. Rutherford Ryley, who coincidentally had reported the first use of carbolic antiseptic in New Zealand. He married Mary Augusta Fosbery on April 27, 1871 and the Maunsells' first child, Ada Mary, was born in 1872, followed by Alice Mary Fosbery (1874), Francis, Miriel Clarence, Kathleen Fosbery (1878) and Lylie Widenham (1880).

Maunsell entered private practice but still had access to the hospital. Surgery was limited, often for injured limbs (lacerations, fractures, dislocations) or excision of diseased joints (e.g., from tuberculosis). The pelvis, abdomen and chest were never opened. In October 1873 Maunsell sustained serious chest injuries when his horse fell. He struck his chest against a tree stump driving two ribs into his lung. He survived but was off work for 10 weeks and was described as being ‘left with a weakness of the lung’. In May 1876 Maunsell sold his practice and took his family to Dublin so he could undertake an MD degree.

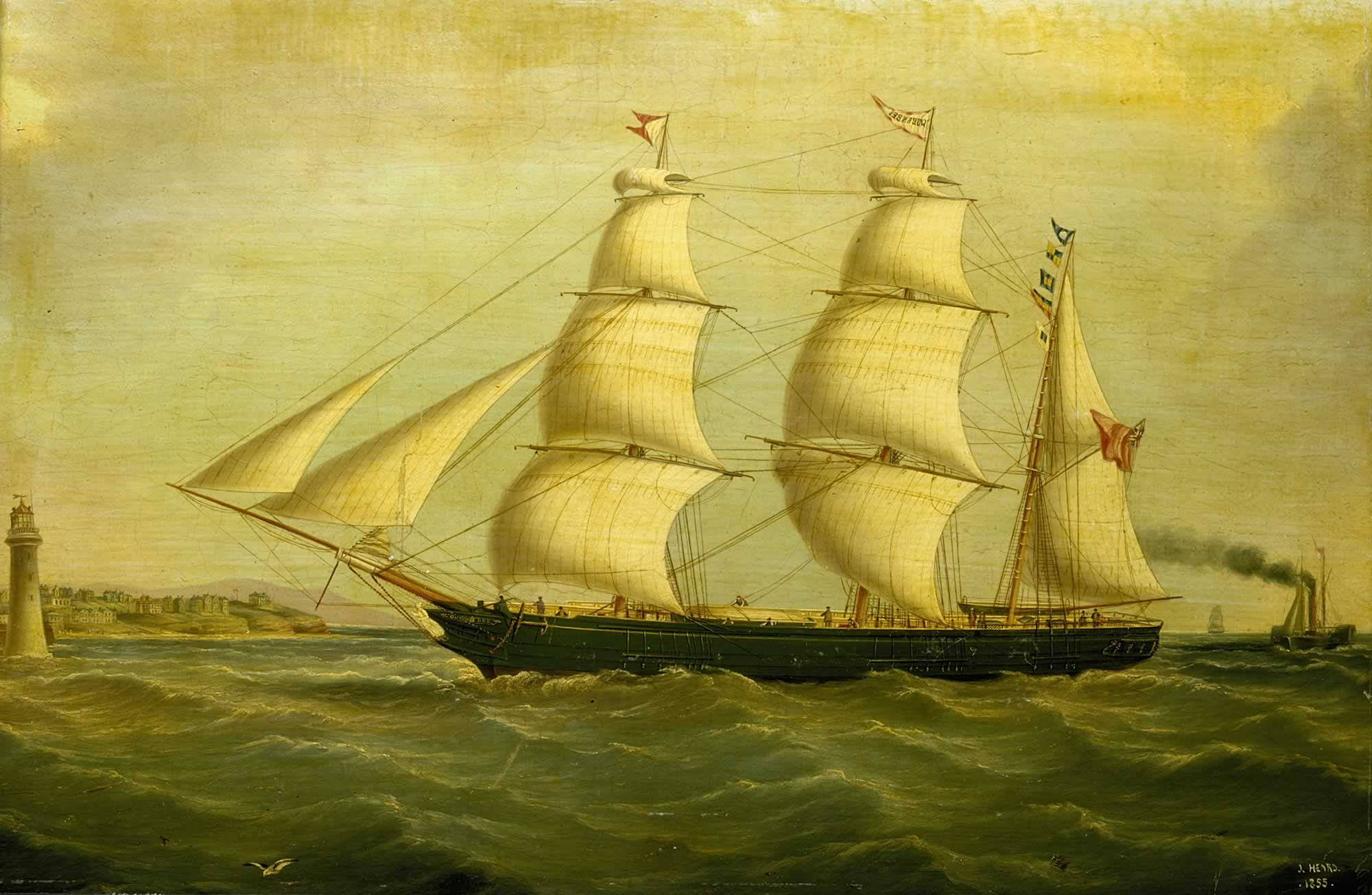
Queen Bee

In 1877, Maunsell (now an MD) and family sailed from London to Nelson on the Queen Bee (a 3 masted barque-726 tons). The 30 passengers included 2 sisters of Mary Maunsell & widow Mrs Gibbs and her 8 children. After 108 days the ship struck Farewell Spit. Three open boats were launched (with no provisions), the first landing to seek help. Boats 2 and 3 drifted for 2 days, landing on D’Urville Island (during which a crew member drowned). Boat 3 (containing the Maunsell/Fosbery group) was later found by Maoris who helped by the Naval Brigade, returned to a jubilant Nelson. Alice Maunsell (3yrs) died 3 months later from the effects of exposure.

On reaching Dunedin, Maunsell purchased a house and gained a coveted position on the Hospital Staff, later also becoming City Health Officer (Dec. 1881). He was soon recognised as a bold and innovative surgeon. In 1887 The NZ Medical Association & NZ Medical Journal started & Maunsell could now publish. In response to complaints from Maunsell & Dr Ferdinand Batchelor, a purpose - built operating theatre was built in which both could safely open the pelvis and abdomen (and in the case of Maunsell, a world first operation, opening the back of the brain). Maunsell represented the New Zealand Medical Association at the first Congress (Adelaide 1887) & presented 7 papers. An important paper at the 2nd Congress (1889) was “A New Method of Intestinal Resection”. Two months later he was appointed “Lecturer on Surgery”.

== Return to London ==
Early in 1891 the University granted Maunsell leave partly on health grounds but also to study schools of surgery in Europe and America. They settled in South Kensington. The Maunsells joined the Royal Colonial Institute (RCI) and, it was reported they “…gave hospitality to all comers from NZ”. At the British Medical Association Meeting in 1891, the combative, anti-Listerism surgeon, Lawson Tait, gave a paper. Maunsell was unfazed when discussing Tait’s paper and then presented his own.

In 1892 Maunsell resigned from the University and began a promising career in London. Two papers (Lancet Feb. & August 1892), described his unique method of bowel anastomosis by invagination, an idea said to have originated by watching his wife’s (or his tailor’s) method of attaching a sleeve, turning it inside out. The second paper described resection of tumour in the lower colon/upper rectum, retaining the sphincters & continence. Maunsell did not forget the University, donating anatomical models and welcoming students in London. In 1893 Queen Victoria opened the Imperial Institute and the Maunsells attended the Royal Gala.

A world pandemic of influenza reached London in early 1895. Maunsell, with previous lung problems, died after a week’s illness aged 49. The funeral was on Feb. 25 and his remains cremated (an uncommon practice at the time), at Woking on Feb. 26. Tributes in his obituaries included those in the British Medical Journal from the eminent Sir Frederick Treves, later surgeon to King Edward VII.
