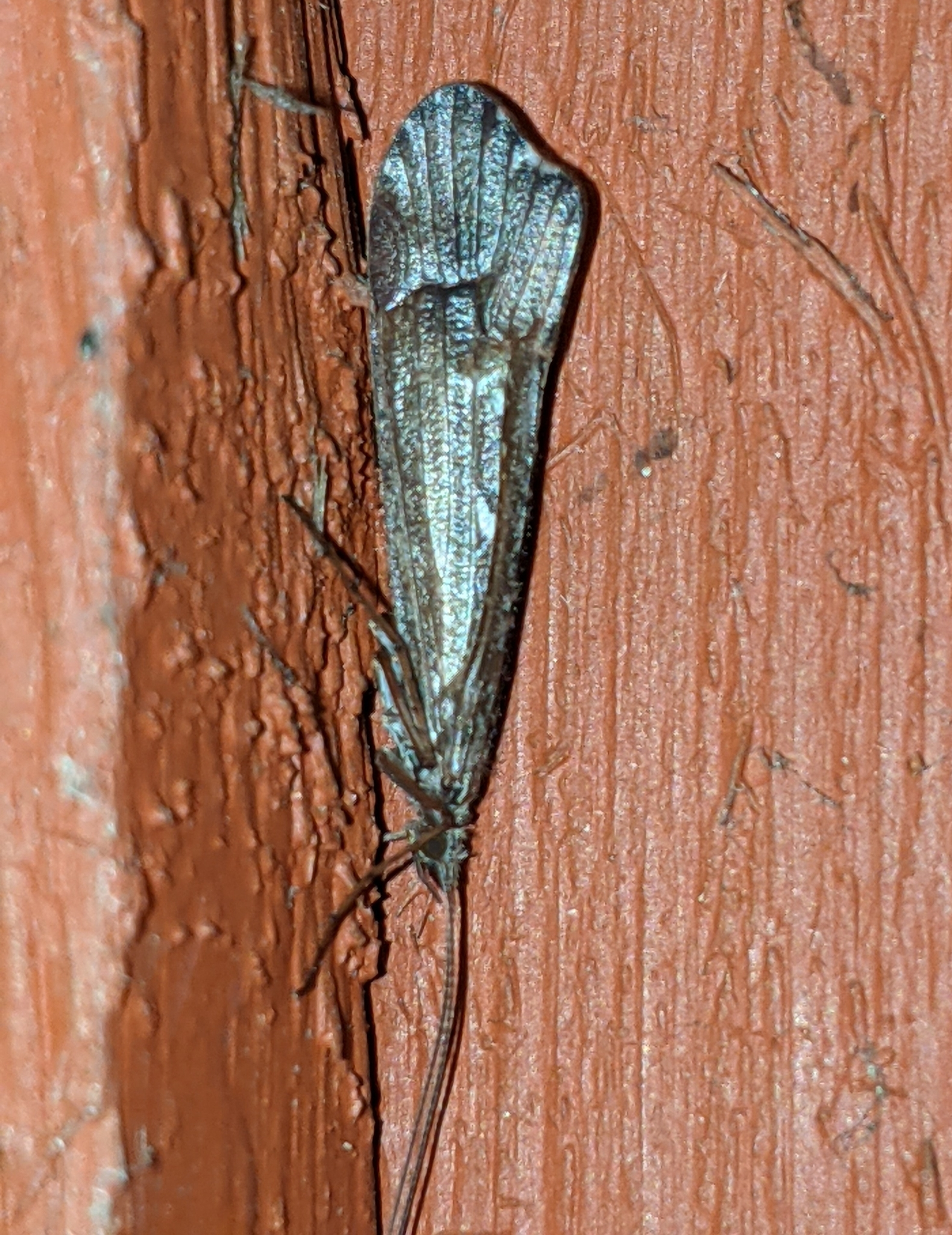

Scientific classification
- Kingdom: Animalia
- Phylum: Arthropoda
- Clade: Pancrustacea
- Class: Insecta
- Order: Trichoptera
- Family: Limnephilidae
- Genus: Glyphopsyche
- Species: G. irrorata

Binomial name
- Glyphopsyche irrorata (Fabricius, 1781)

Synonyms
- Glyphopsyche bryanti Banks, 1904; Glyphopsyche intercisa (Walker, 1852); Glyphopsyche obsoleta (Harris, 1835); Goniotaulius intercisa (Walker, 1852); Phryganea irrorata Fabricius, 1781

= Glyphopsyche irrorata =

Species of caddisfly

Glyphopsyche irrorata is a species of northern caddisfly in the family Limnephilidae.
