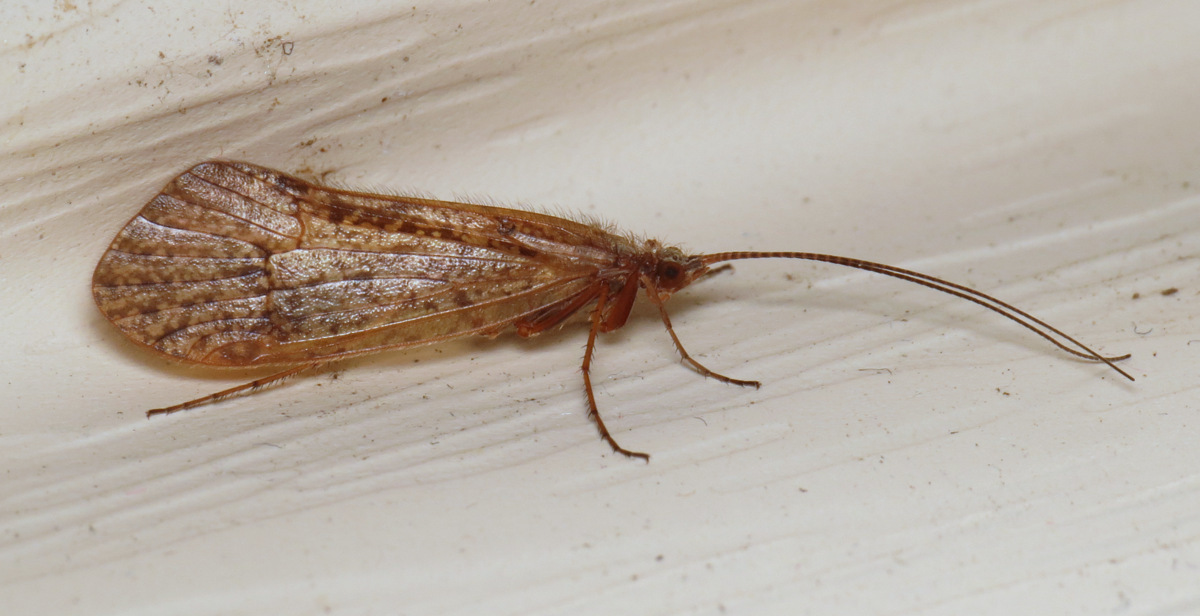
- Frenesia missa

Scientific classification
- Kingdom: Animalia
- Phylum: Arthropoda
- Clade: Pancrustacea
- Class: Insecta
- Order: Trichoptera
- Family: Limnephilidae
- Tribe: Chilostigmini
- Genus: Frenesia; Betten & Mosely, 1940

= Frenesia =

Genus of caddisflies

Frenesia is a genus of northern caddisflies in the family Limnephilidae. There are at least two described species in Frenesia.

== Species ==
These two species belong to the genus Frenesia:

- Frenesia difficilis (Walker, 1852)
- Frenesia missa (Milne, 1935)
