= John Rutherford Ryley =

Australian surgeon

John Rutherford Ryley LRCP, MD, FRCSEd
- Born: 1837; Waterford, County Waterford, UK
- Died: 3 March 1884 (aged 46–47); Sydney, Australia
- Education: Anderson's University, Glasgow
- Occupation: Surgeon
- Known for: Introducing antiseptic surgery to New Zealand

John Rutherford Ryley (1837 – 3 March 1884) was an Australian surgeon who studied medicine in Glasgow, where he learned about Listerian antisepsis from Joseph Lister. He emigrated to New Zealand and introduced antiseptic surgery there in January 1868. Most of his career was then spent in Australia. He killed himself at the age of 46.

== Early life ==
John Rutherford Ryley was born in Waterford, Ireland, in 1837. His father was William Ryley, a seaman, and his mother Jane Margaret Ryley, (née Rutherford). At the age of 17 he moved to Glasgow, working as a solicitor's clerk before studying medicine at Anderson's University, part of the extramural school of medicine. He was awarded prizes in botany, materia medica and midwifery. Among the lectures he attended were surgical lectures by Joseph Lister who had been appointed Professor of Surgery in 1860. Ryley married Margaret Skirving in Glasgow on 19 July 1858 but she died shortly after delivering a son, William, in 1861 and William was brought up in Glasgow by her parents. In 1862, Ryley qualified as a Licentiate of the Royal College of Surgeons of Edinburgh (LRCSEd) and so became a registered medical practitioner. He later obtained a number of other qualifications: FRCS Edinburgh (1868), LRCP London (1871), MD Pennsylvania (1879) and LRCP Edinburgh (1879).

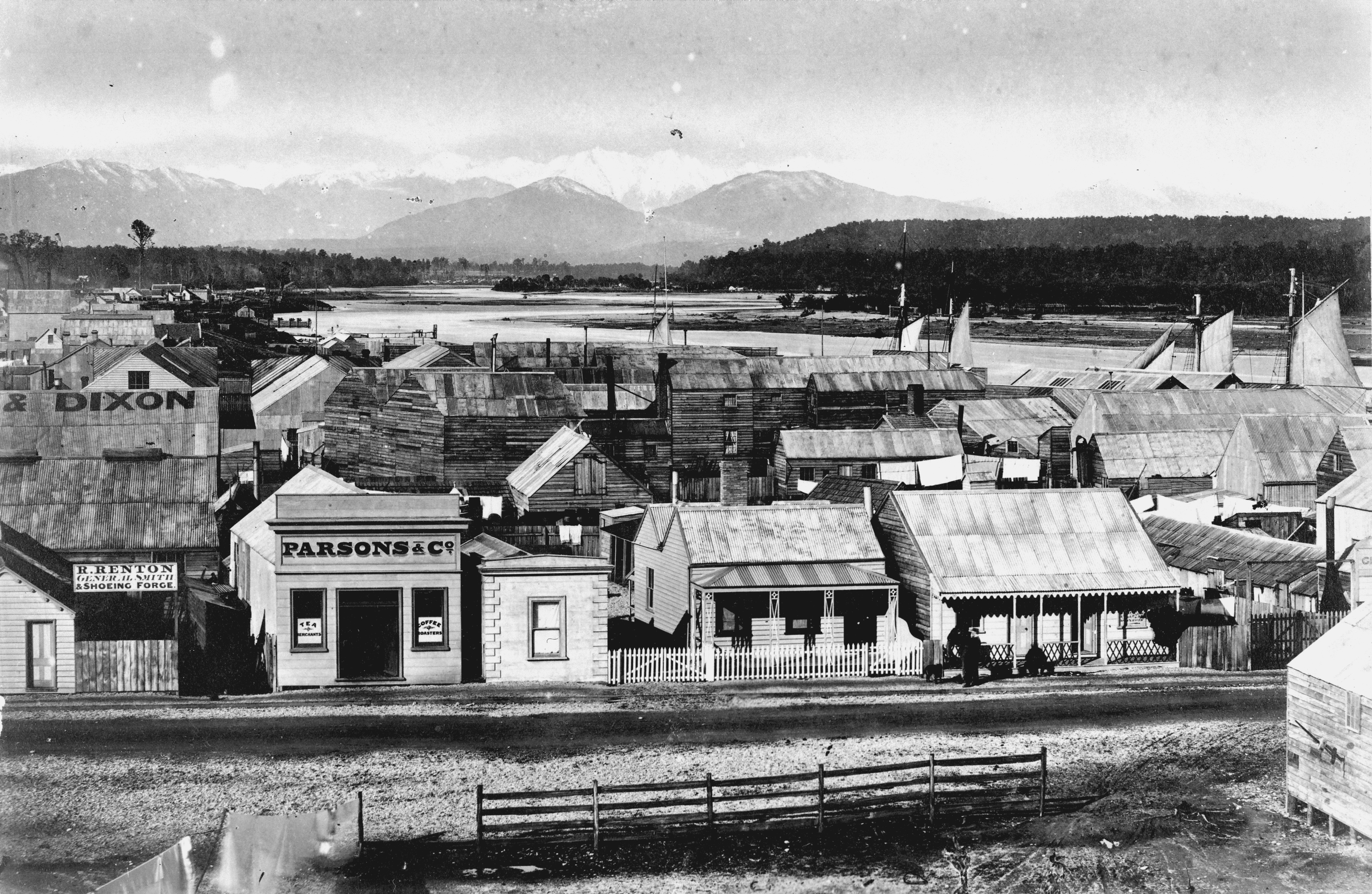
Hokitika township, c. 1870s

== Early career ==
After qualifying, Ryley moved to New Zealand and his medical career is characterised by travel, as he tended not to stay for long in any one post. He sailed for New Zealand on the Sir William Eyre as the ship's doctor and arrived at Invercargill in May 1863. Here he set up in practice and married Charlotte Robinson. He registered as a doctor in Queenstown and, moving to the west coast, was appointed surgeon-superintendent of Hokitika Hospital, and surgeon to the jail and the Hokitika Lunatic Asylum between 1866 and 1869. These had been established to provide care for gold miners during New Zealand's West Coast gold rush. Early in 1868 Ryley returned to Britain and passed the examination to become FRCSEd in May 1868. He was appointed assessor for Westland for the New Zealand Medical Board on 15 December 1868.

== Antiseptic surgery ==
In January 1868, while working at Hokitika Hospital, Ryley successfully used Lister's newly described method of antisepsis in three cases and published the results. Lister had published his seminal paper in The Lancet in March 1867, followed by a series of papers later that year describing the technique in detail with clinical examples. Ryley treated one patient with a large axillary abscess and two miners with compound fractures of the tibia and fibula. He was eager to try Lister's method, particularly because "the last two cases of compound fracture treated in an ordinary way in the Hospital over which I preside had terminated fatally". He used the technique of carbolic-soaked bandages and dressings described by Lister and published an account of this in The Lancet in May 1868. He claimed that this was the first successful use of the technique in the colonies, but he had in fact been preceded in this in 1867 by George Hogarth Pringle in Australia. This was however the first time that antiseptic surgical technique had been used in New Zealand. He continued to use the technique routinely describing results in his hospital reports. He also corresponded with Sir Joseph Fayrer, an authority on enteric disease, and published a paper suggesting that the cause of typhoid fever in Westland, New Zealand was the water drunk by the miners. Ryley was succeeded as surgeon in Hokitika by Henry Widenham Maunsell.

== Later career ==
He traveled to Levuka, Fiji in 1870 and there, in addition to medical practice, he became a member of the Fijian Parliament but resigned his seat after less than a year for "personal reasons". He was then appointed coroner and officer of health for Fiji in 1871 and surgeon to the jail the following year. After less than a year he resigned and moved to Sydney, Australia. From September 1873 to February 1875 he practised in Western Australia, first in Roeboume and then in Champion Bay before moving to Adelaide, South Australia, where he practiced in Redhill and then in Gawler. He returned to Britain gaining specialist work experience at the Royal Ophthalmic Hospital, Moorfields, and at the Hospital for the Throat Ear and Chest at Golden Square, London.

In 1879 he qualified as an M.D. in Pennsylvania and later that year he served in South Africa as a civilian surgeon attached to a field hospital during the Zulu War. Returning to Britain he sat and passed the examination to become a Licentiate of the Royal College of Physicians of Edinburgh (LRCPE).

Ryley then traveled back to Sydney, Australia. He practised in New South Wales, in a series of hospital posts successively at Temora, Tenterfield, Gulgong and then as a partner in practice at Mudgee. During this time he published a number of papers in the medical press.

== Mental health and death ==
Ryley was admitted to the Auckland Lunatic Asylum on 2 March 1870. Inspection at that time revealed that he had a throat scar from an earlier suicide attempt. The medical admission notes record that "his wife tells me that he has repeatedly threatened to kill her; he would as soon do it as eat his breakfast". At discharge on 26 March 1870, the asylum doctor declared that "longer incarceration would be likely to convert a case of slight mental irritability into confirmed lunacy."

In February 1884, suffering from stress, he checked into the Post Office Hotel in Sydney, Australia. There he swallowed a mixture of morphia with prussic acid and was transferred to the Sydney Hospital where he was certified as "insane" and died the next day. The cause of death was given at the inquest as suicide from an intentional overdose of morphia.
