= Chilostigma itascae =

Scientific classification
- Domain: Eukaryota
- Kingdom: Animalia
- Phylum: Arthropoda
- Class: Insecta
- Order: Trichoptera
- Family: Limnephilidae
- Genus: Chilostigma
- Species: C. itascae

Binomial name
- Chilostigma itascae Wiggins, 1975

Species of caddisfly

Chilostigma itascae, also known as the headwaters chilostigman, is a species of caddisfly in the family Limnephilidae. It was discovered in mile-long Nicollet Creek, the Mississippi River's headwaters in Itasca State Park, Minnesota, which remained the only known location for the species for 31 years. However, in 2005 and 2011 it was found in other locations in and around Itasca State Park and in 2017 an effort to study winter caddisflies by the Minnesota Biological Survey found it in peatland locations scattered across the northwestern part of the state and there are unconfirmed photo records from across the Canadian border in Thunder Bay District, Ontario. It was discovered by Glenn Wiggins, a scientist from the Royal Ontario Museum, on New Year's Eve of 1974, and was scientifically described by him in the following year. Unlike other caddisflies, its adult emergence occurs in the winter under the cover of deep snow.
