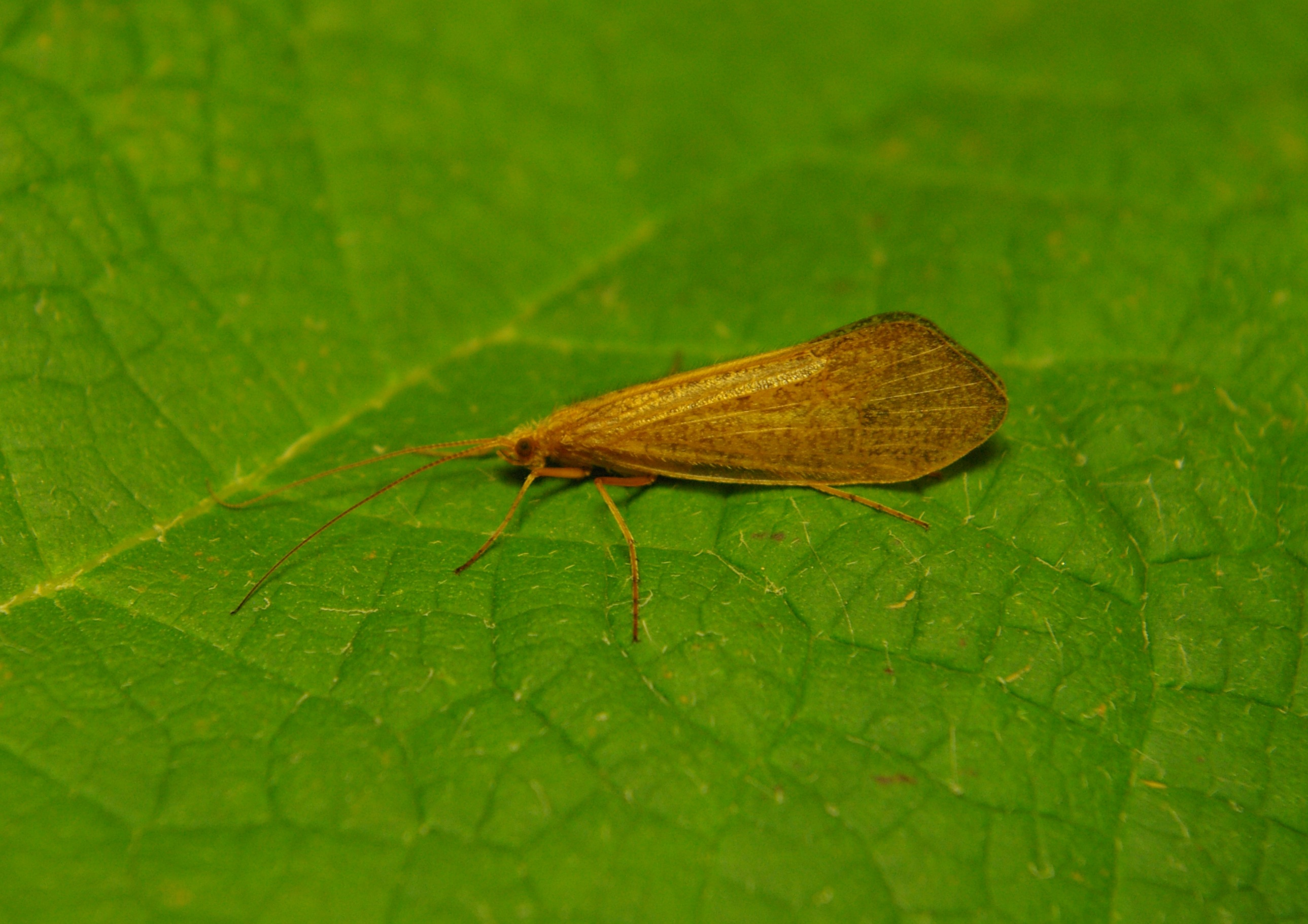
- Glyphopsyche sequatchie

Scientific classification
- Kingdom: Animalia
- Phylum: Arthropoda
- Clade: Pancrustacea
- Class: Insecta
- Order: Trichoptera
- Family: Limnephilidae
- Subfamily: Limnephilinae
- Tribe: Chilostigmini
- Genus: Glyphopsyche; Banks, 1904

= Glyphopsyche =

Genus of caddisflies

Glyphopsyche is a genus of northern caddisflies in the family Limnephilidae. There are at least three described species in Glyphopsyche.

== Species ==
These three species belong to the genus Glyphopsyche:

- Glyphopsyche irrorata (Fabricius, 1781)
- Glyphopsyche missouri Ross, 1944
- Glyphopsyche sequatchie Etnier & Hix, 1999
