= Mary Gibbs (conservationist) =

American park superintendent and conservationist

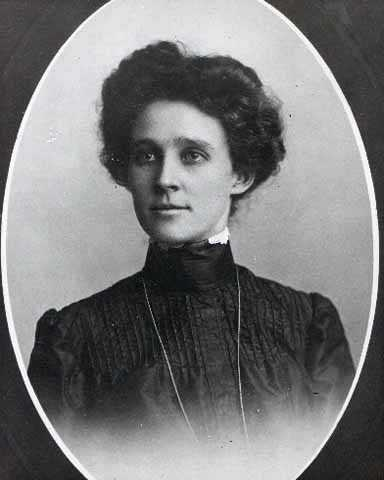
- Born: 1879; Atwater, Kandiyohi County, Minnesota, United States
- Died: February 4, 1983 (age 104); Vancouver, British Columbia, Canada

Mary Hannah Gibbs Logan (1879 – February 4, 1983) was the superintendent for Itasca State Park and a pivotal figure in the development of the park, located in Minnesota at the headwaters of the Mississippi River. Gibbs was the first female park commissioner in the United States.

== Early life ==
Mary Hannah Gibbs was born in Atwater, Kandiyohi County, Minnesota in 1879. Minnesota Governor Samuel Van Sant appointed her father John Puckett Gibbs (1840-1903) as the superintendent of Itasca State Park in 1901 and the family moved into quarters at Lake Itasca.

== Service at Itasca State Park ==
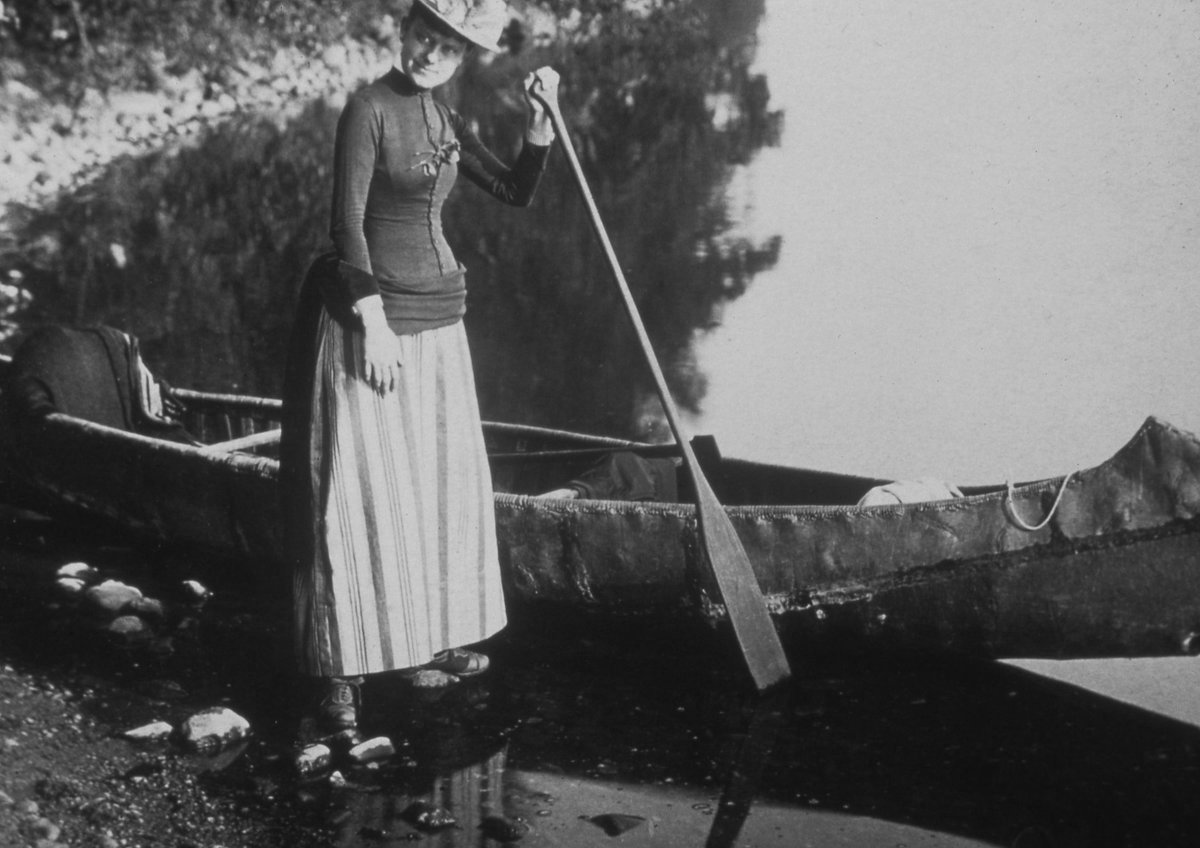
Mary Hannah Gibbs

Mary worked under her father as the park secretary. When her father died, Mary was just 24 years old, but she knew the park's operations well. She was appointed the acting superintendent of Itasca State Park by Governor Van Sant in 1903.

A local lumber company, the Mississippi Schoolcraft Boom and Improvement Company, built a dam to facilitate its logging operations. Concerned that the flooding would kill the park's old-growth pine forest, Gibbs ordered the company to open the dam. When Gibbs and the local sheriff brought a warrant to open dam's lift, the company's lumber boss threatened to shoot "anyone who puts a hand on these levers." Gibbs responded, "I will put my hand there, and you will not shoot it off either," and tried to move the levers, though she was not strong enough to do so. After his threat was proved futile, the lumber boss ordered the gates opened, and he and another worker were brought to jail.

Soon afterwards, rumors spread that Gibbs had been armed during the confrontation; the Minneapolis Journal ran a headline on April 24, 1903 reading "She had nerve, and a big gun too." The company obtained an injunction threatening Gibbs with arrest if she returned to the dam. Minnesota's attorney general reversed that injunction, ordering the lowering of the water levels. Just a week later, the governor appointed a new park commissioner, one friendlier to the logging industry. Gibbs would not accept the demotion and resigned her position. The loggers maintained a dam in the park for another fifteen years, until the supply of timber in the area was exhausted.

== Later life ==
Gibbs left Minnesota shortly after resigning her position. She married William Alexander Logan in 1904 and they homesteaded 50 acres in Alberta. They had four children and moved to Vancouver, British Columbia in 1919. Mary Gibbs Logan died at age 104 on February 4, 1983.

== Legacy ==
Although she served in the role of acting Park Commissioner for only a short time, Gibbs was described in the Minneapolis Star Tribune in 2015 as "a preservationist ahead of her time." She was the first woman to serve in the role of park commissioner in the nation.

The Mary Gibbs Mississippi Headwaters Center and Interpretive Plaza, featuring exhibits exploring the history, geography, geology, and natural environment of the area, was dedicated in 2005.

== Image gallery ==
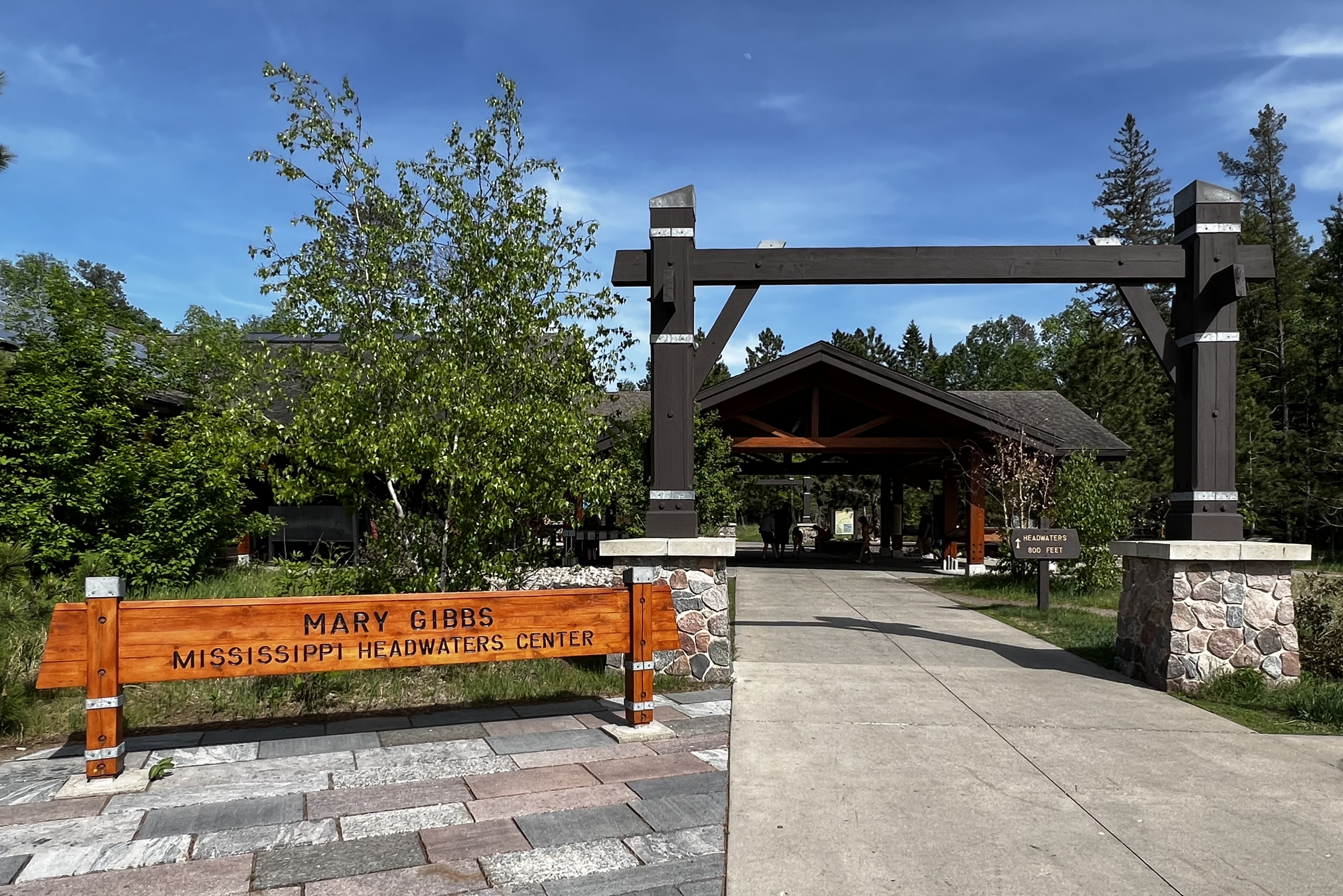
Mary Gibbs Mississippi Headwaters Center at Itasca State Park
