= Mary Elizabeth Gibbs =

New Zealand homemaker and community leader

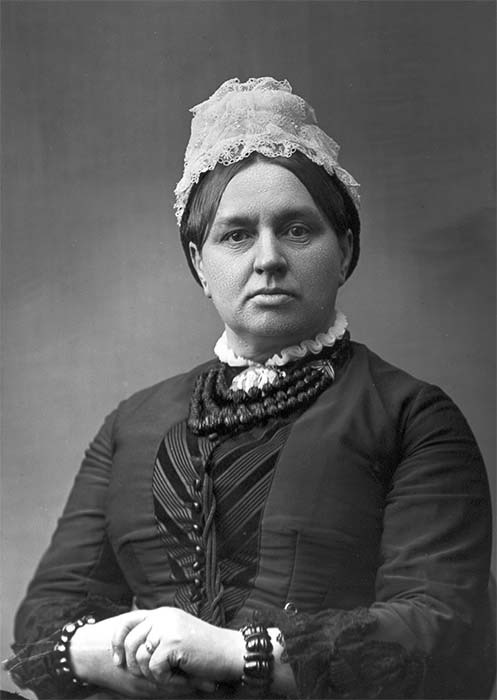
- Born: 10 January 1836; Aldsworth, Gloucestershire, England
- Died: 21 October 1920 (aged 84); Nelson, New Zealand
- Occupations: Homemaker; community leader

Mary Elizabeth Gibbs (née Waine; 10 January 1836 – 21 October 1920) was a New Zealand homemaker and community leader.

== Biography ==
She was born in Aldsworth, Gloucestershire, England, on 10 January 1836.

Gibbs and her family were passengers on board the Queen Bee when it struck Farewell Spit on 6 August 1877 at about midnight.

She died in Nelson on 21 October 1920, and was buried in Wakapuaka Cemetery.
