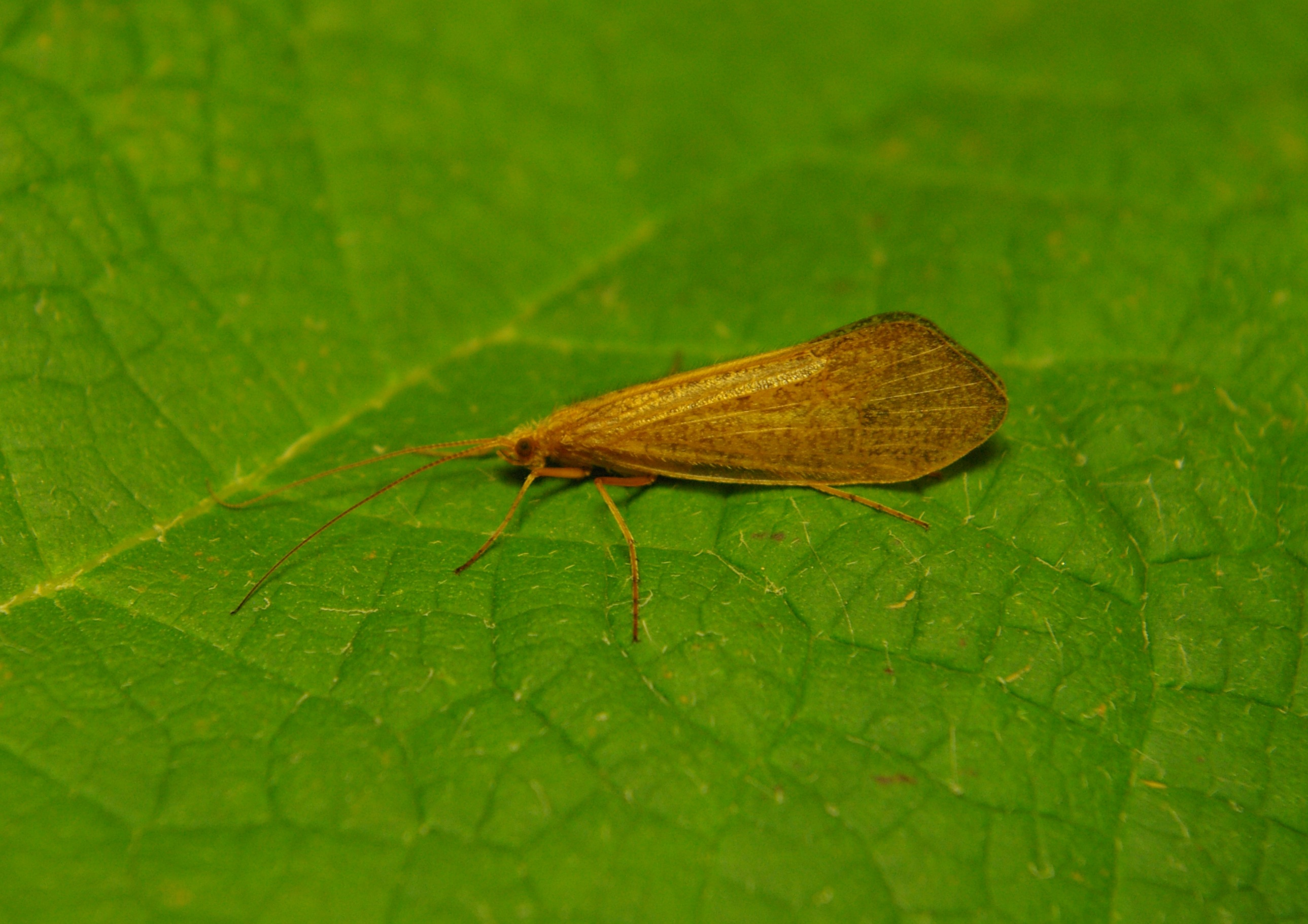
- Glyphopsyche sequatchie

Scientific classification
- Kingdom: Animalia
- Phylum: Arthropoda
- Clade: Pancrustacea
- Class: Insecta
- Order: Trichoptera
- Family: Limnephilidae
- Subfamily: Limnephilinae
- Tribe: Chilostigmini; Schmid, 1955

= Chilostigmini =

Tribe of caddisflies

Chilostigmini is a tribe of northern caddisflies in the family Limnephilidae. There are about 12 genera and at least 40 described species in Chilostigmini.

The type genus for Chilostigmini is Chilostigma R. McLachlan, 1876.

== Genera ==
These 12 genera belong to the tribe Chilostigmini:

- Brachypsyche Schmid, 1952^{i c g}
- Chiloecia Navas, 1930
- Chilostigma McLachlan, 1876^{i c g b}
- Chilostigmodes Martynov, 1914^{i c g}
- Desmona Denning, 1954^{i c g b}
- Frenesia Betten & Mosely, 1940^{i c g b}
- Glyphopsyche Banks, 1904^{i c g b}
- Grensia Ross, 1944^{i c g}
- Homophylax Banks, 1900^{i c g b}
- Phanocelia Banks, 1943^{i c g b}
- Pielus Navás, 1935^{i c g}
- Psychoglypha Ross, 1944^{i c g b}

Data sources: i = ITIS, c = Catalogue of Life, g = GBIF, b = Bugguide.net
