= Pycnopsyche limbata =

Scientific classification
- Kingdom: Animalia
- Phylum: Arthropoda
- Clade: Pancrustacea
- Class: Insecta
- Order: Trichoptera
- Family: Limnephilidae
- Tribe: Stenophylacini
- Genus: Pycnopsyche
- Species: P. limbata

Binomial name
- Pycnopsyche limbata (McLachlan, 1871)

Species of caddisfly

Pycnopsyche limbata is a species of northern caddisfly in the family Limnephilidae, which lives in North America.
