= Halesus =

Halesus may refer to:

- Halesus, mythological Greek character, see Halaesus
- Halesus (insect), genus of caddisflies
