= Halesus digitatus =

Scientific classification
- Kingdom: Animalia
- Phylum: Arthropoda
- Clade: Pancrustacea
- Class: Insecta
- Order: Trichoptera
- Family: Limnephilidae
- Tribe: Stenophylacini
- Genus: Halesus
- Species: H. digitatus

Binomial name
- Halesus digitatus (Schrank, 1781)

Species of caddisfly

Halesus digitatus is a species of caddisfly in the family Limnephilidae. It is native to the United Kingdom and widespread across Western Europe, Central Europe and Scandinavia. The species was described by Franz von Paula Schrank in 1781. Adults are typically 17 to 23 mm in length.

As it is popularly used by anglers as bait, it is also known as the Anglers' Caperer.

It can be distinguished from the similar H. radiatus, which is also called the Anglers' Caperer, by its slightly different wing pattern.

== Taxonomy ==
Halesus digitatus contains the following subspecies:

- Halesus digitatus digitatus
- Halesus digitatus caucasicus
