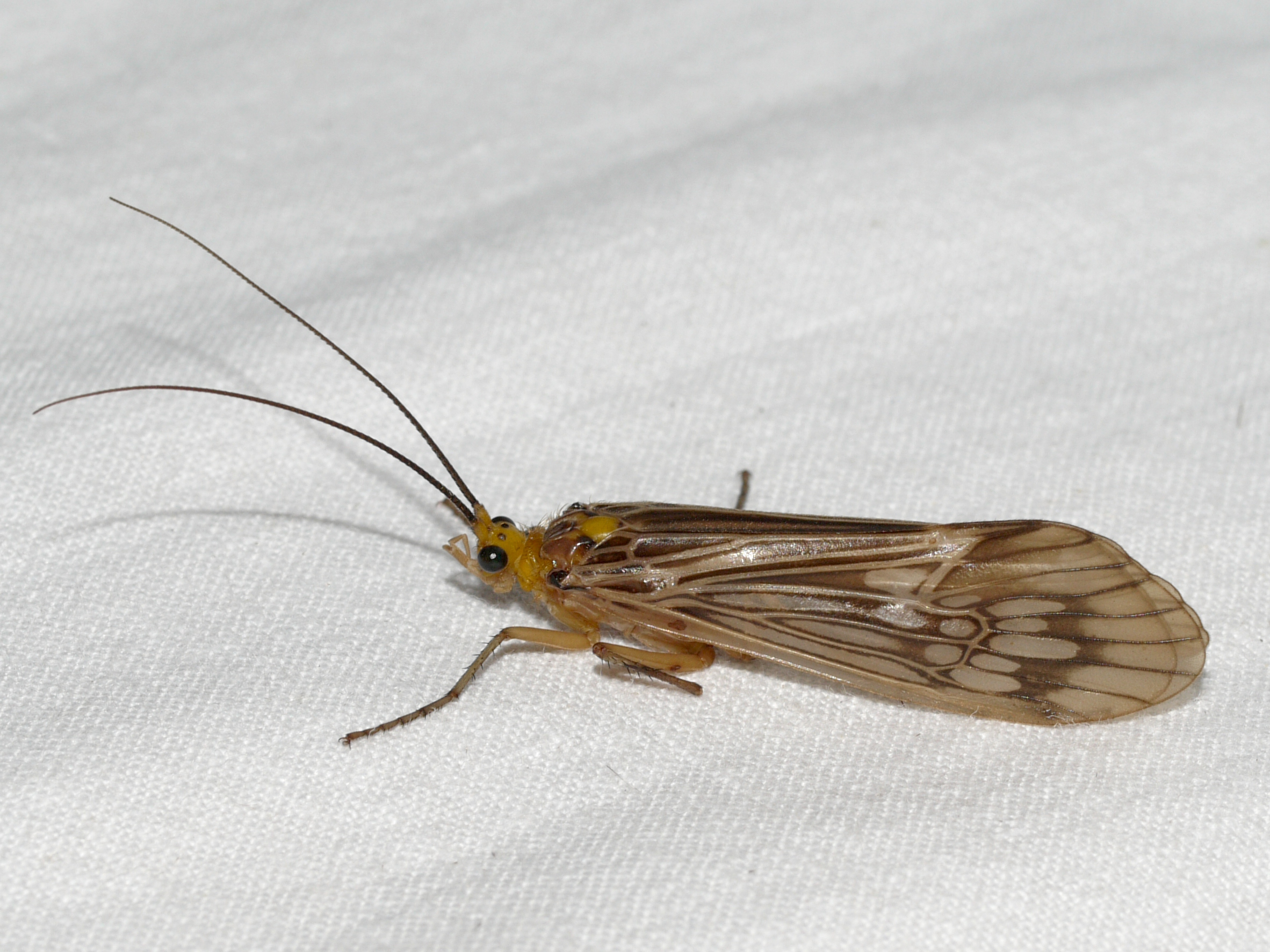

Scientific classification
- Kingdom: Animalia
- Phylum: Arthropoda
- Clade: Pancrustacea
- Class: Insecta
- Order: Trichoptera
- Family: Limnephilidae
- Tribe: Stenophylacini
- Genus: Hydatophylax
- Species: H. argus

Binomial name
- Hydatophylax argus (Harris, 1869)

= Hydatophylax argus =

Species of caddisfly

Hydatophylax argus is a species of northern caddisfly in the family Limnephilidae. It is found in North America.
