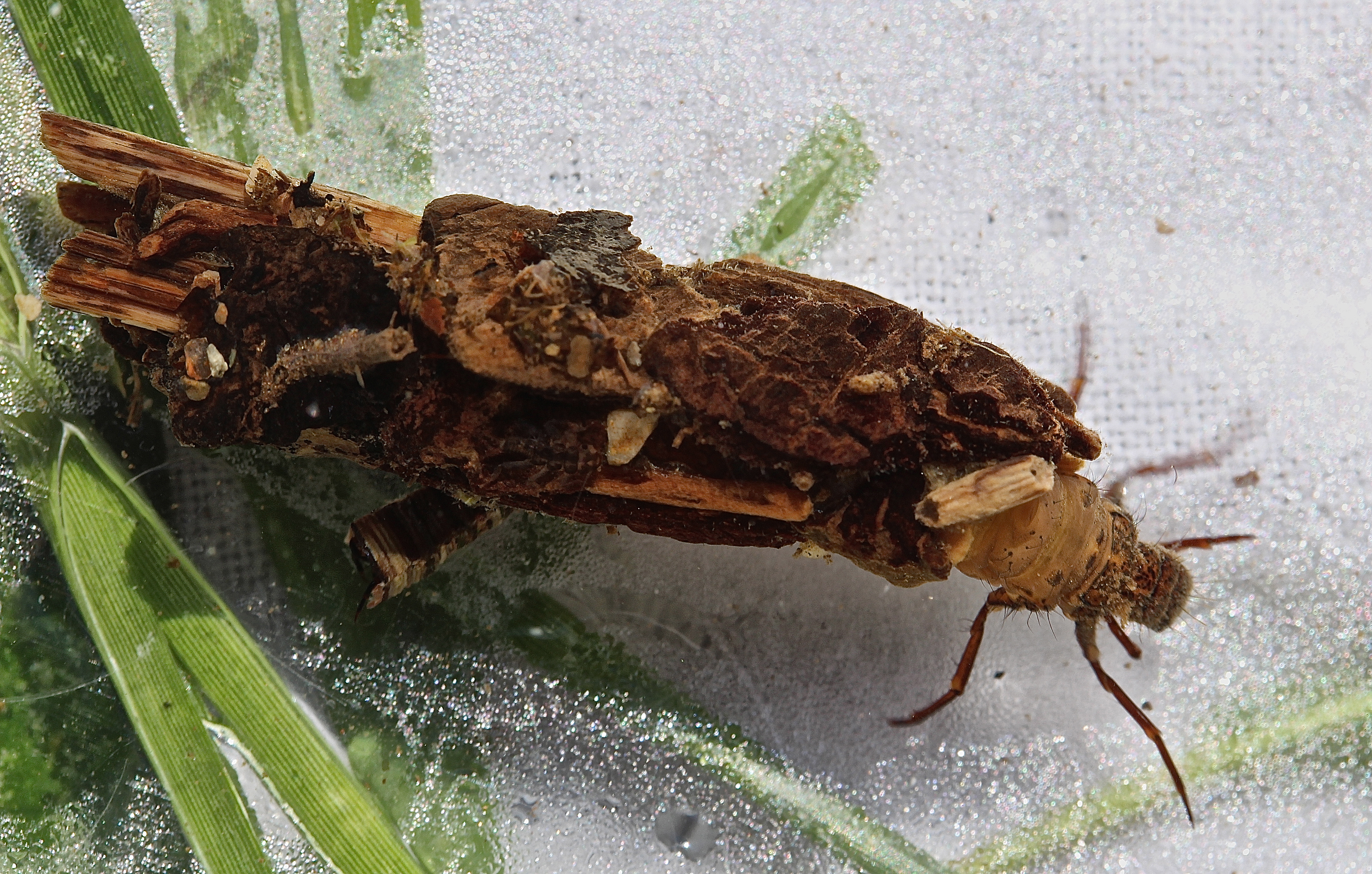

Scientific classification
- Kingdom: Animalia
- Phylum: Arthropoda
- Clade: Pancrustacea
- Class: Insecta
- Order: Trichoptera
- Family: Limnephilidae
- Tribe: Stenophylacini
- Genus: Pycnopsyche
- Species: P. scabripennis

Binomial name
- Pycnopsyche scabripennis (Rambur, 1842)

Synonyms
- Pycnopsyche perplexa Betten & Mosely, 1940

= Pycnopsyche scabripennis =

Species of caddisfly

Pycnopsyche scabripennis, the giant red sedge, is a species of northern caddisfly in the family Limnephilidae.
