= Pycnopsyche lepida =

Scientific classification
- Kingdom: Animalia
- Phylum: Arthropoda
- Clade: Pancrustacea
- Class: Insecta
- Order: Trichoptera
- Family: Limnephilidae
- Tribe: Stenophylacini
- Genus: Pycnopsyche
- Species: P. lepida

Binomial name
- Pycnopsyche lepida (Hagen, 1861)

Species of caddisfly

Pycnopsyche lepida is a species of northern caddisfly in the family Limnephilidae. It is found in North America.
