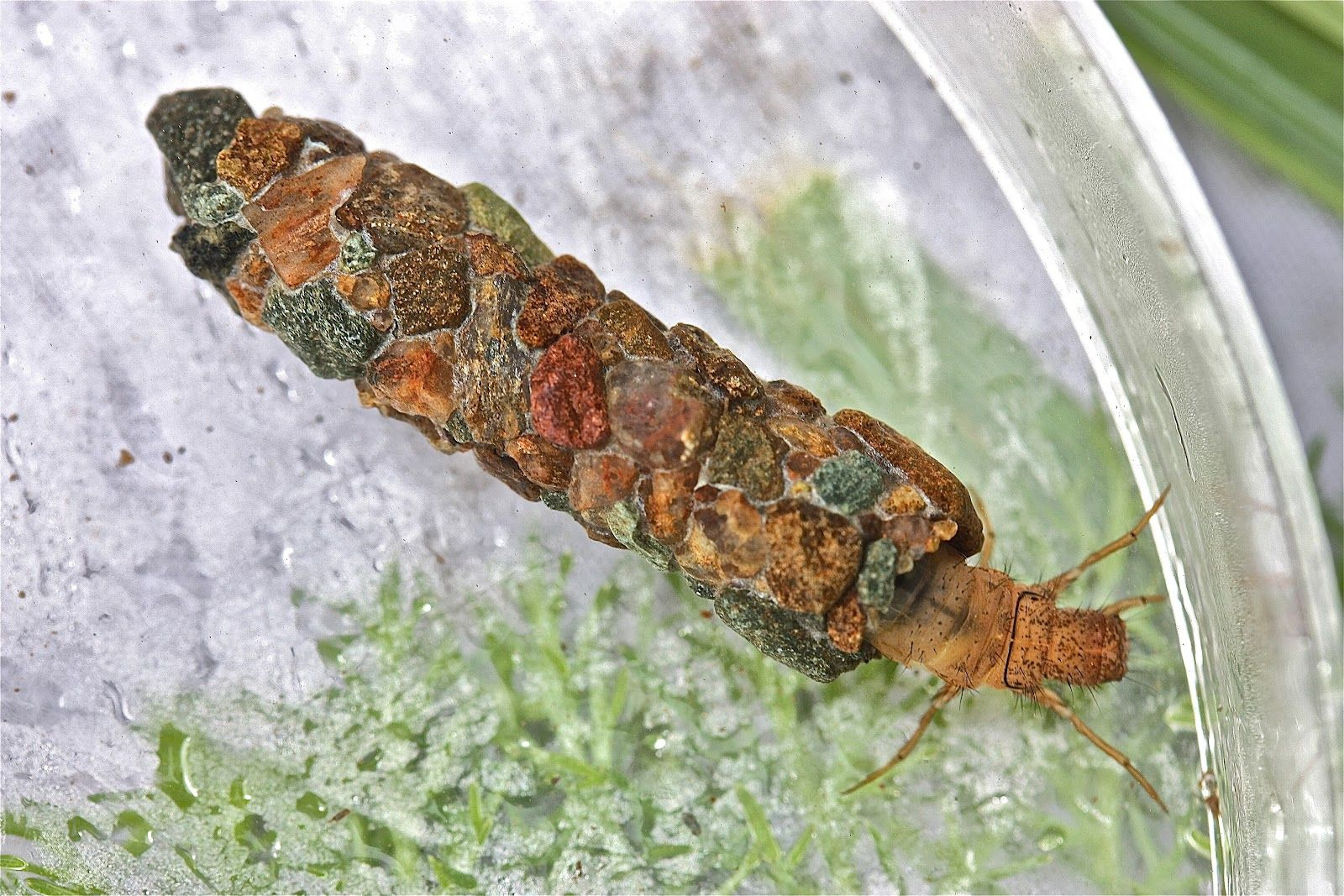
- Pycnopsyche larva

Scientific classification
- Kingdom: Animalia
- Phylum: Arthropoda
- Clade: Pancrustacea
- Class: Insecta
- Order: Trichoptera
- Family: Limnephilidae
- Tribe: Stenophylacini
- Genus: Pycnopsyche; Banks, 1905

= Pycnopsyche =

Genus of caddisflies

Pycnopsyche is a genus of northern caddisflies in the family Limnephilidae. There are about 17 described species in Pycnopsyche.

ITIS Taxonomic note:

- Type species: Limnephila scabripennis P Rambur (original designation).

== Species ==
- Pycnopsyche aglona Ross, 1941
- Pycnopsyche antica (Walker, 1852)
- Pycnopsyche circularis (Provancher, 1877)
- Pycnopsyche conspersa Banks, 1943
- Pycnopsyche divergens (Walker, 1852)
- Pycnopsyche flavata (Banks, 1914)
- Pycnopsyche gentilis (McLachlan, 1871) (caddisfly)
- Pycnopsyche guttifera (Walker, 1852)
- Pycnopsyche indiana (Ross, 1938)
- Pycnopsyche lepida (Hagen, 1861)
- Pycnopsyche limbata (McLachlan, 1871)
- Pycnopsyche luculenta (Betten, 1934)
- Pycnopsyche rossi Betten, 1950
- Pycnopsyche scabripennis (Rambur, 1842) (giant red sedge)
- Pycnopsyche sonso (Milne, 1935)
- Pycnopsyche subfasciata (Say, 1828)
- Pycnopsyche virginica (Banks, 1900)
