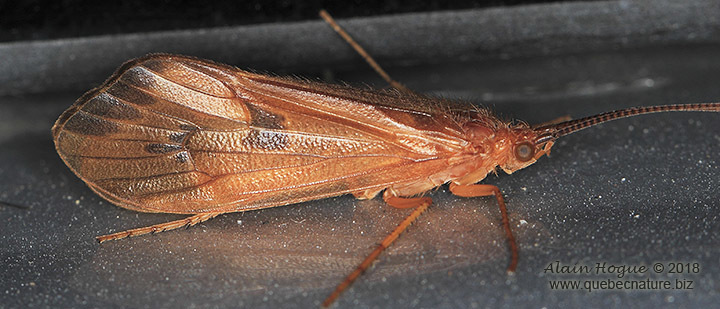

Scientific classification
- Kingdom: Animalia
- Phylum: Arthropoda
- Clade: Pancrustacea
- Class: Insecta
- Order: Trichoptera
- Family: Limnephilidae
- Genus: Pycnopsyche
- Species: P. guttifera

Binomial name
- Pycnopsyche guttifera (Walker, 1852)

= Pycnopsyche guttifera =

Species of caddisfly

Pycnopsyche guttifera is a species of northern caddisfly in the family Limnephilidae. It is found in North America.
