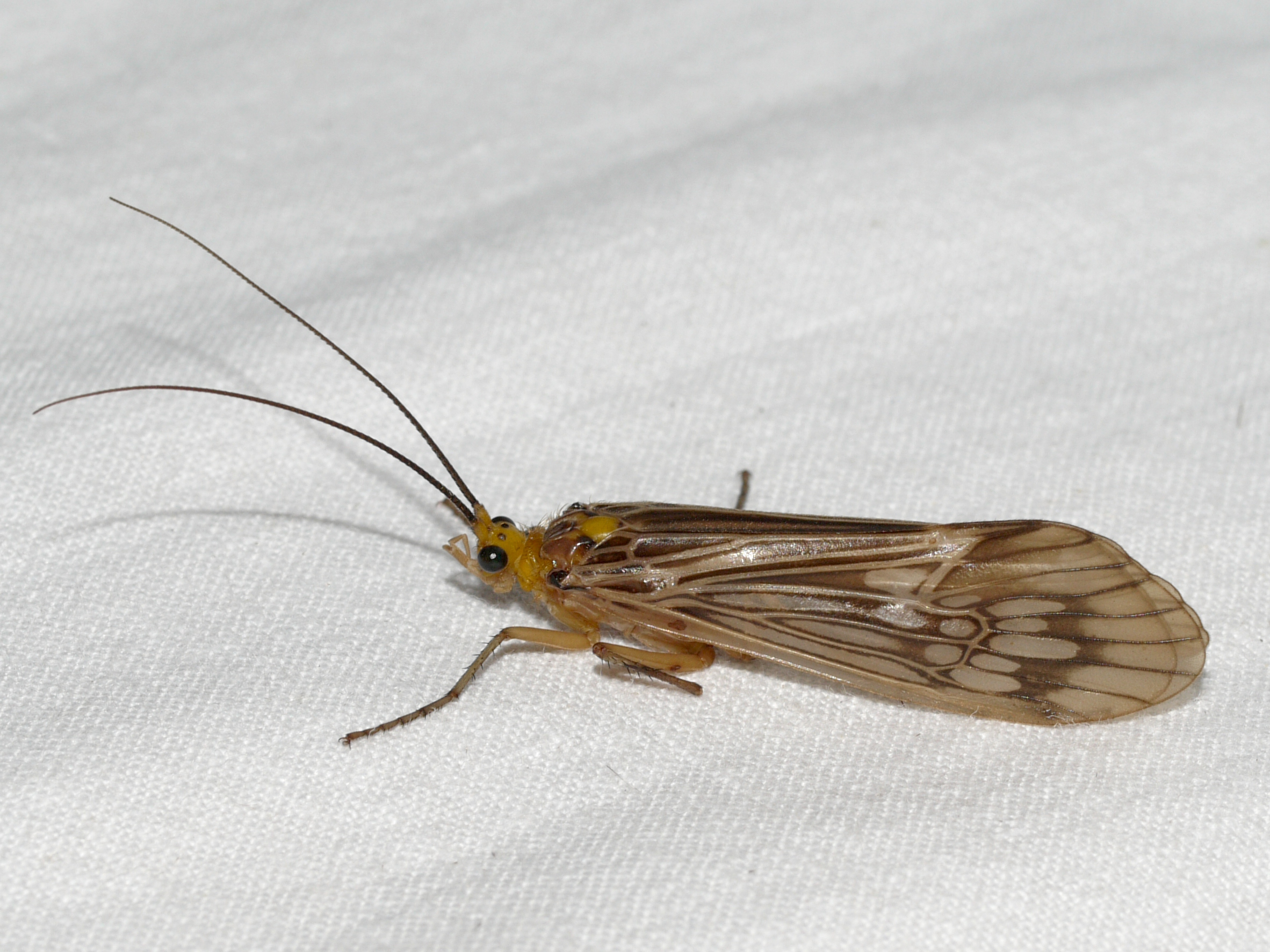
- Hydatophylax argus

Scientific classification
- Kingdom: Animalia
- Phylum: Arthropoda
- Clade: Pancrustacea
- Class: Insecta
- Order: Trichoptera
- Family: Limnephilidae
- Subfamily: Limnephilinae
- Tribe: Stenophylacini
- Genus: Hydatophylax; Wallengren, 1891

Synonyms
- Astenophylax Ulmer, 1907

= Hydatophylax =

Genus of caddisflies

Hydatophylax is a genus of northern caddisflies in the family Limnephilidae. There are about 14 described species in Hydatophylax.

== Species ==
These 14 species belong to the genus Hydatophylax:

- Hydatophylax argus (Harris, 1869)
- Hydatophylax festivus (Navas, 1920)
- Hydatophylax formosus Schmid, 1965
- Hydatophylax grammicus (McLachlan, 1880)
- Hydatophylax hesperus (Banks, 1914)
- Hydatophylax infumatus (McLachlan, 1865)
- Hydatophylax magnus (Martynov, 1914)
- Hydatophylax nigrovittatus (McLachlan, 1872)
- Hydatophylax primoryensis Nimmo, 1995
- Hydatophylax sakharovi Kumanski, 1991
- Hydatophylax soldatovi (Martynov, 1914)
- Hydatophylax spartacus Schmid, 1950
- Hydatophylax variabilis (Martynov, 1910)
- Hydatophylax victor Banks, 1950
