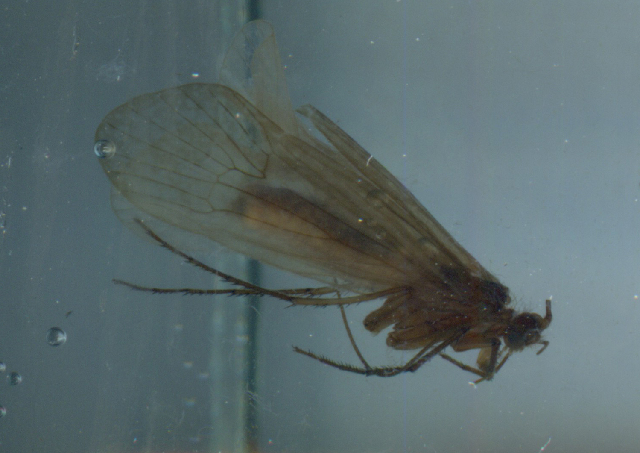
- Allogamus ligonifer

Scientific classification
- Missing taxonomy template (fix): Allogamus

= Allogamus =

Genus of caddisflies

Allogamus is a genus of caddis-flies in the tribe Stenophylacini, erected by Fernand Schmid in 1955. Species have been recorded mostly from Europe, including the British Isles.

== Species ==
The Catalogue of Life includes:

1. Allogamus alpensis Oláh, Lodovici & Valle, 2014
2. Allogamus antennatus (McLachlan, 1876)
3. Allogamus auricollis (Pictet, 1834)
4. Allogamus ausoniae Moretti, 1991
5. Allogamus botosaneanui Moretti, 1991
6. Allogamus brauerii (Kolenati, 1859)
7. Allogamus corsicus (Ris, 1897)
8. Allogamus dacicus (Schmid, 1951)
9. Allogamus despaxi Decamps, 1968
10. Allogamus hilaris (McLachlan, 1876)
11. Allogamus illiesorum Botosaneanu, 1980
12. Allogamus kefes Oláh & Coppa, 2014
13. Allogamus laureatus (Navas, 1918)
14. Allogamus lazeri Szczesny, 1967
15. Allogamus ligonifer (McLachlan, 1876)
16. Allogamus mendax (McLachlan, 1876)
17. Allogamus mortoni (Navas, 1907)
18. Allogamus pantinii Oláh, Lodovici & Valle, 2014
19. Allogamus pertuli Malicky, 1974
20. Allogamus pupos Oláh & Coppa, 2014
21. Allogamus stadleri (Schmid, 1951)
22. Allogamus starmarchi Szczesny, 1967
23. Allogamus tatricus Szczesny, 1967
24. Allogamus uncatus (Brauer, 1857)
25. Allogamus zomok Oláh & Coppa, 2014
