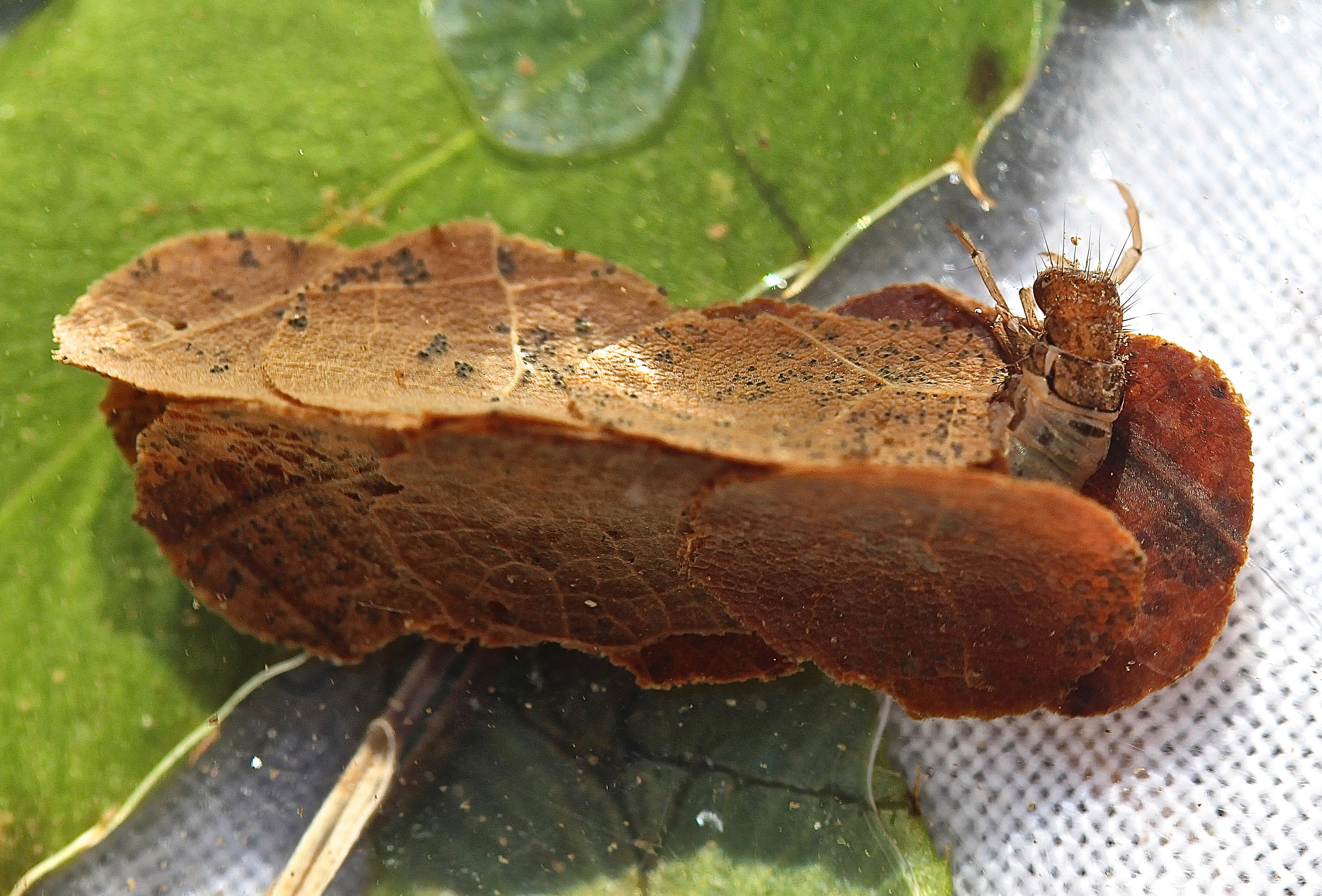

Scientific classification
- Kingdom: Animalia
- Phylum: Arthropoda
- Clade: Pancrustacea
- Class: Insecta
- Order: Trichoptera
- Family: Limnephilidae
- Genus: Pycnopsyche
- Species: P. gentilis

Binomial name
- Pycnopsyche gentilis (McLachlan, 1871)

= Pycnopsyche gentilis =

Species of caddisfly

Pycnopsyche gentilis, the caddisfly, is a species of northern caddisfly in the family Limnephilidae. It is found in North America.
