= Stenophylax =

Scientific classification
- Kingdom: Animalia
- Phylum: Arthropoda
- Clade: Pancrustacea
- Class: Insecta
- Order: Trichoptera
- Family: Limnephilidae
- Subfamily: Limnephilinae
- Tribe: Stenophylacini
- Genus: Stenophylax; Kolenati, 1848

Synonyms
- Micropterna Stein, 1874

Genus of insects

Stenophylax is a genus of insects belonging to the family Limnephilidae.

The species of this genus are found in Europe, Eastern Asia and Northern America.

Species:

- Stenophylax alex Mey & Mueller, 1980
- Stenophylax badukus (Mey & Mueller, 1979)
