= Clostoeca =

Scientific classification
- Kingdom: Animalia
- Phylum: Arthropoda
- Clade: Pancrustacea
- Class: Insecta
- Order: Trichoptera
- Family: Limnephilidae
- Tribe: Stenophylacini
- Genus: Clostoeca; Banks, 1943
- Species: C. disjuncta

Binomial name
- Clostoeca disjuncta (Banks, 1914)

Genus of caddisflies

Clostoeca is a genus of northern caddisflies in the family Limnephilidae. There is one described species in Clostoeca, C. disjuncta.
