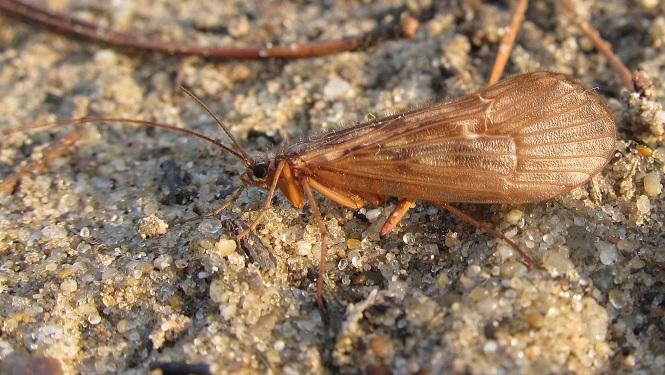
- Halesus radiatus

Scientific classification
- Kingdom: Animalia
- Phylum: Arthropoda
- Clade: Pancrustacea
- Class: Insecta
- Order: Trichoptera
- Family: Limnephilidae
- Tribe: Stenophylacini
- Genus: Halesus; Stephens, 1836

= Halesus (insect) =

Genus of caddisflies

Halesus is a genus of caddisflies belonging to the family Limnephilidae.

The genus was first described by James Francis Stephens in 1836.

The species of this genus are found in Eurasia and North America.

Species:

- Halesus digitatus
- Halesus radiatus
- Halesus tesselatus
