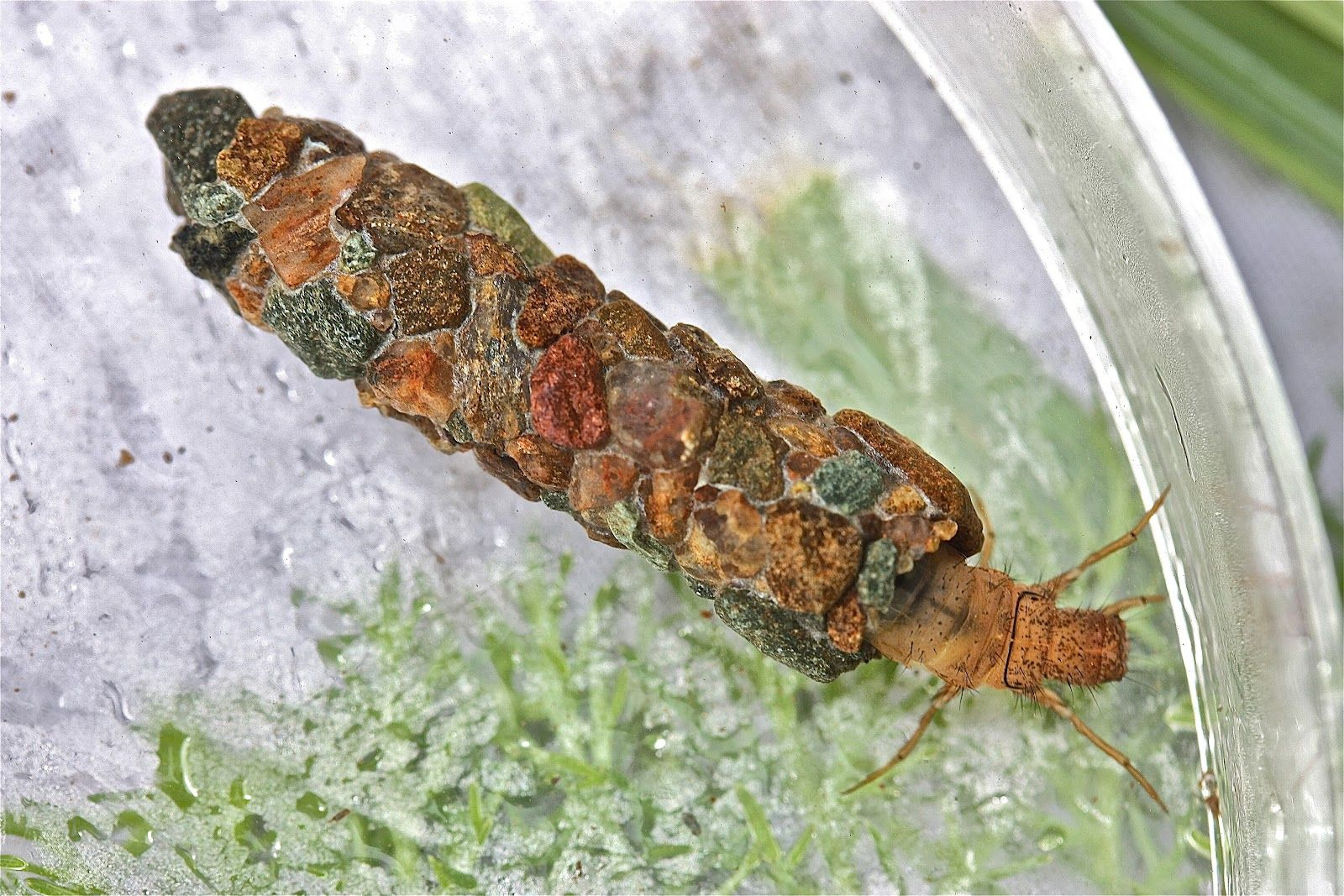
- Pycnopsyche

Scientific classification
- Kingdom: Animalia
- Phylum: Arthropoda
- Clade: Pancrustacea
- Class: Insecta
- Order: Trichoptera
- Family: Limnephilidae
- Subfamily: Limnephilinae
- Tribe: Stenophylacini; Schmid, 1955

= Stenophylacini =

Tribe of caddisflies

Stenophylacini is a tribe of northern caddisflies in the family Limnephilidae. There are at least 20 genera and 190 described species in Stenophylacini.

The type genus for Stenophylacini is Stenophylax F. Kolenati, 1848.

== Genera ==
These 24 genera belong to the tribe Stenophylacini:

- Acrophylax Brauer, 1867^{i c g}
- Allogamus Schmid, 1955^{i c g}
- Anisogamodes Martynov, 1924^{i c g}
- Anisogamus McLachlan, 1874^{i c g}
- Chionophylax Schmid, 1951^{i c g}
- Chyranda Ross, 1944^{i}
- Clostoeca Banks, 1943^{i c g b}
- Consorophylax Schmid, 1955^{i c g}
- Enoicyla Rambur, 1842^{i c g}
- Enoicylopsis Navas, 1917^{i c g}
- Halesus Stephens, 1836^{i c g}
- Hydatophylax Wallengren, 1891^{i c g b}
- Isogamus Schmid, 1955^{i c g}
- Leptotaulius Schmid, 1955^{i c g}
- Melampophylax Schmid, 1955^{i c g}
- Mesophylax McLachlan, 1882^{i c g}
- Parachiona Thomson, 1891^{i c g}
- Philocasca Ross, 1941^{i c g b}
- Platyphylax McLachlan, 1871^{i c g}
- Potamophylax Wallengren, 1891^{i c g}
- Psilopterna Martynov, 1915^{i c g}
- Pycnopsyche Banks, 1905^{i c g b}
- Stenophylax Kolenati, 1848^{i c g}
- † Tricheopteryx Cockerell, 1927

Data sources: i = ITIS, c = Catalogue of Life, g = GBIF, b = Bugguide.net
